= Alejandro =

Name

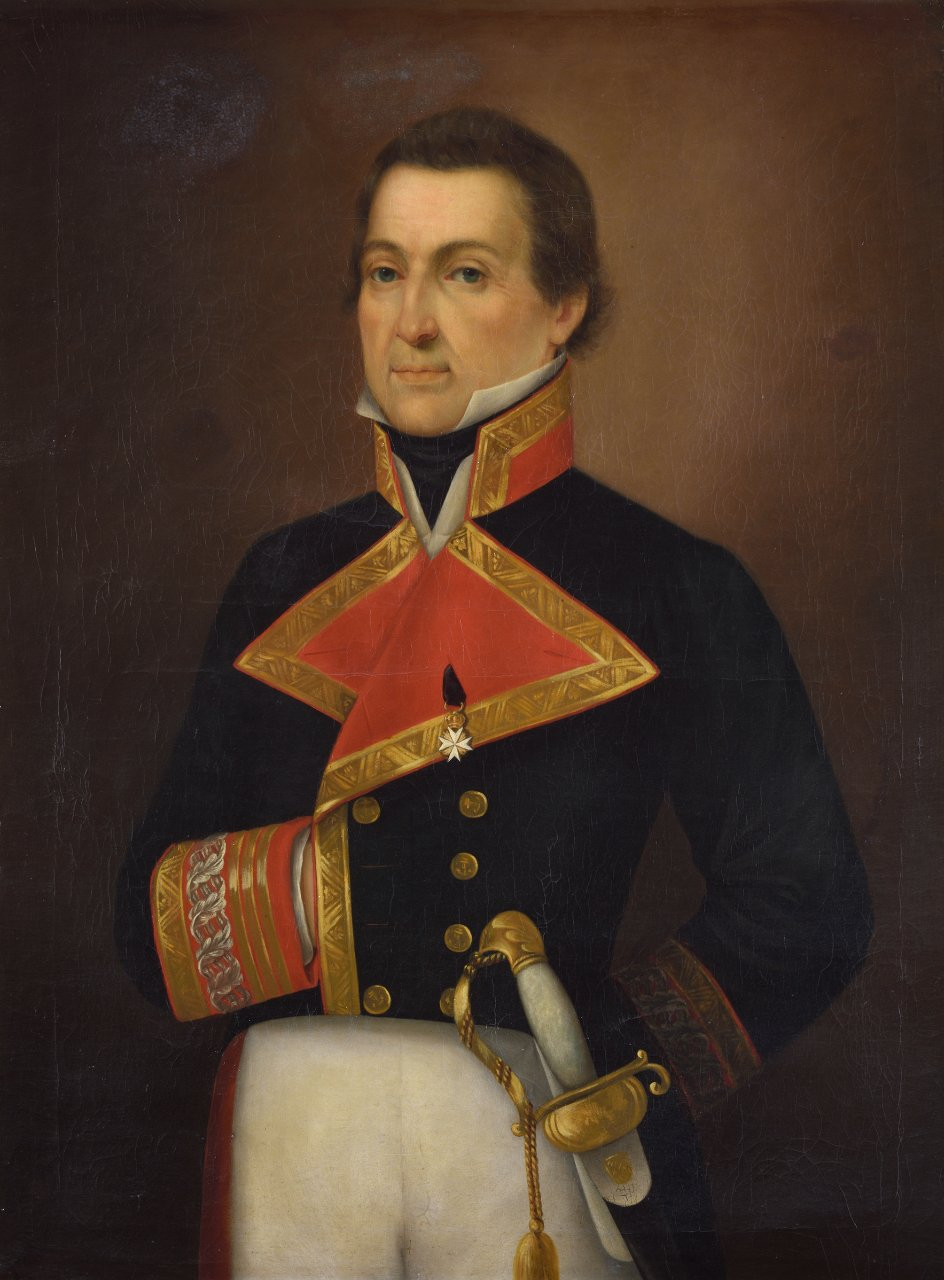
- Alejandro Malaspina
- Pronunciation: [aleˈxandɾo]
- Gender: Male
- Language: Spanish

Origin
- Meaning: "Defender, protector of mankind"
- Region of origin: Greece

Other names
- Variant form: Alexandro (Archaic form in Spanish)
- Related names: Alejándrez (Surname)
- See also: Alejandra, Alexandra, Alexander, Alex, Alessandro, Alexandru, Alexandre

Alejandro is a masculine given name, the Spanish form of the English name Alexander, derived from the Latin Alexander and the Ancient Greek Aléxandros (Αλέξανδρος), meaning "defender of man". The name Alexandro (now an archaic form) was the primary rendition in Spanish. However, the transition from Alexandro to Alejandro resulted from specific phonetic and orthographic adaptations in the Spanish language, whereby the letter "x" was replaced by "j" to conform to the language's phonological and orthographic conventions.

Intriguingly, archaic forms such as Alexandro, Aleixandre, or Alexandre persist in certain Spanish-speaking regions (notably in Galicia or within literary contexts), though they are rare and significantly less prevalent than Alejandro. In Spanish culture, the name Alejandro is associated with patronymic surnames such as Aleixandre (which also serves as an archaic form of the given name) and, most notably, Alejándrez (as Juan Manuel Alejándrez).

The name Alejandro manifests in various forms across different linguistic traditions, including Alexandre (French, Portuguese, Catalan, and Galician), Alessandro (Italian), Alexandru (Romanian), Aleksandr (Russian), among others.

== People with the given name Alejandro ==
- Alejandro Alvizuri (born 1968), Peruvian backstroke swimmer
- Alejandro Amenábar (born 1972), Chilean-born Spanish director
- Alejandro Aranda (born 1994), American singer, musician, and reality television personality
- Alejandro Arguello (born 1982), Mexican footballer
- Alejandro Avila (born 1973), Mexican TV actor
- Alejandro Awada (born 1961), Argentine actor
- Alejandro Balde (born 2003), Spanish Footballer
- Alejandro Betts (1947–2020), Argentine historian
- Alejandro Bermeo, Colombian politician
- Alejandro Bermúdez (born 1975), Colombian swimmer
- Alejandro Bustillo (1889–1982), Argentine architect
- Alejandro Carrión (1915–1992), Ecuadorian poet and novelist
- Alejandro Casañas (born 1954), Cuban hurdler
- Alejandro Castillo (born 1987), Mexican footballer
- Alejandro Cercas (born 1949), Spanish politician
- Alejandro Chataing (1873–1928), Venezuelan architect
- Alejandro Cichero (born 1977), Venezuelan footballer
- Alejandro Corichi, Mexican theoretical physicist
- Alejandro Cortés (cyclist) (born 1977), Colombian road cyclist
- Alejandro Cruz (disambiguation), several people
- Alejandro Diz (born 1965), Argentine volleyball player
- Alejandro Doherty (born 1965), Argentine field hockey player
- Alejandro Dolina (born 1944), Argentine broadcaster
- Alejandro Domínguez, former chief of police in Nuevo Laredo, Mexico
- Alejandro Edda (born 1984), Mexican-American actor
- Alejandro Escovedo (born 1951), American singer-songwriter
- Alejandro Falla (born 1983), Colombian tennis player
- Alejandro Felipe Paula (1937–2018), Netherlands Antilles politician and historian
- Alejandro Fernández (born 1971), Mexican singer
- Alejandro Fernández Sordo (1921–2009), Spanish politician
- Alejandro Freire (born 1974), Venezuelan-American baseball player
- Alejandro García (disambiguation), several people
- Alejandro Garnacho (born 2004), Argentine footballer
- Alejandro González Iñárritu (born 1963), Mexican director
- Alejandro Walter González (born 1972), Argentine road cyclist
- Alejandro Gorostiaga (1840–1912), Chilean military
- Alejandro Herrera (Heroes), fictional character in the TV series
- Alejandro Herrera (athlete) (born 1958), Cuban athlete
- Alejandro Jodorowsky (born 1929), Chilean actor and director
- Alejandro Kirk (born 1998), Mexican baseball player
- Alejandro Agustín Lanusse (1918–1996), former Argentine President
- Alejandro Lazo, Cuban-American dancer
- Alejandro Lerner (born 1957), Argentine musician
- Alejandro Lerroux (1864–1949), Spanish politician
- Alejandro González Malavé (1957–1986), Puerto Rican undercover police agent
- Alejandro Martinez, Andorran punk rock guitarist and back-up singer in Anonymous
- Alejandro Manzano, lead singer in Puerto Rican-American alternative rock band Boyce Avenue
- Alejandro Mayorkas (born 1959), U.S. Secretary of the Department of Homeland Security
- Alejandro Mirasol, Filippino politician
- Alejandro Meloño (born 1977), Uruguayan footballer
- Alejandro Moreno (born 1979), Venezuelan footballer
- Alejandro Muñoz-Alonso (1934–2016), Spanish politician
- Alejandro Naif (born 1973), Palestinian footballer
- Alejandro Obregón (1920–1992), Colombian painter, muralist, sculptor, and engraver
- Alejandro O'Reilly (1723–1794), Irish-born Spanish governor of colonial Louisiana
- Alejandro Orfila (1925–2021), Argentine diplomat
- Alejandro Ortuoste (born 1931), Filipino boxer
- Alejandro Osuna (born 2002), Mexican baseball player
- Alejandro Padilla (born 1973), American politician
- Alejandro Pacheco (born 1972), Venezuelan sports commentator
- Alejandro Peña (born 1959), Dominican baseball player
- Alejandro Cao de Benos de Les y Pérez (born 1974), president of the Korean Friendship Association
- Alejandro Planchart (1935–2019), Venezuelan-American musicologist and composer
- Alejandro Portes (born 1944), Cuban-American sociologist
- Alejandro Pozuelo (born 1991), Spanish footballer
- Alejandro Ramírez (chess player) (born 1988), Costa Rican international grandmaster of chess
- Alejandro Ramírez Calderón (born 1981), Colombian road cyclist
- Alejandro Rebollo Álvarez-Amandi (1934–2015), Spanish lawyer, civil servant and politician
- Alejandro Rey (1930–1987), Argentine actor
- Alejandro Rivera, NCIS character
- Alejandro Tapia y Rivera (1826–1882), Puerto Rican poet and writer
- Alejandro Encinas Rodríguez (born 1954), Mexican politician
- Alejandro Rosario (born 2002), American baseball player
- Alejandro Rossi (1932–2009), Mexican writer
- Alejandro Saab (born 1994), American voice actor
- Alejandro Sabella (1954–2020), Argentine footballer
- Alejandro Salazar (born 1984), American footballer
- Alejandro Sanz (born 1968), Spanish pop musician
- Alejandro Siqueiros (born 1982), Mexican freestyle swimmer
- Alejandro Severo (208–235), the Spanish version of Alexander Severus, former Roman emperor
- Alejandro M. Sinibaldi (1825–1896), President of Guatemala
- Alejandro Siri (born 1963), Argentine field hockey player
- Alejandro Sosa, fictional drug lord from the 1983 film Scarface
- Alejandro Spajic (born 1976), Argentine volleyball player
- Alejandro de la Sota (1913–1996), Spanish architect
- Alejandro Toledo (born 1946), Peruvian politician, ex-president
- Alejandro de Tomaso (1928–2003), Argentine auto racing driver
- Alejandro Trujillo (1952–2020), Chilean footballer
- Alejandro Valverde (born 1980), Spanish cyclist
- Rey Alejandro Conde Valdivia, Mexican conductor
- Alejandro Velasco Astete (1897–1925), Peruvian pilot
- Alejandro Villanueva (born 1988), NFL Offensive tackle, and former Army Ranger
- Alejandro Zaera (born 1963), Spanish architect
- Alejandro Zohn (1930–2000), Mexican architect

== People with the surname Alejandro ==
- Edesio Alejandro (1958–2025), Cuban composer of electronic music
- Hajji Alejandro (1954–2025), Filipino singer and actor
- Rachel Alejandro (born 1974), Filipina singer and actress

== See also ==
- Alejandro Sniper Rifle
- Alexandro
- Alexandre (disambiguation)
- Alexander
- Alessandro
- Sandro
