= Alessandra =

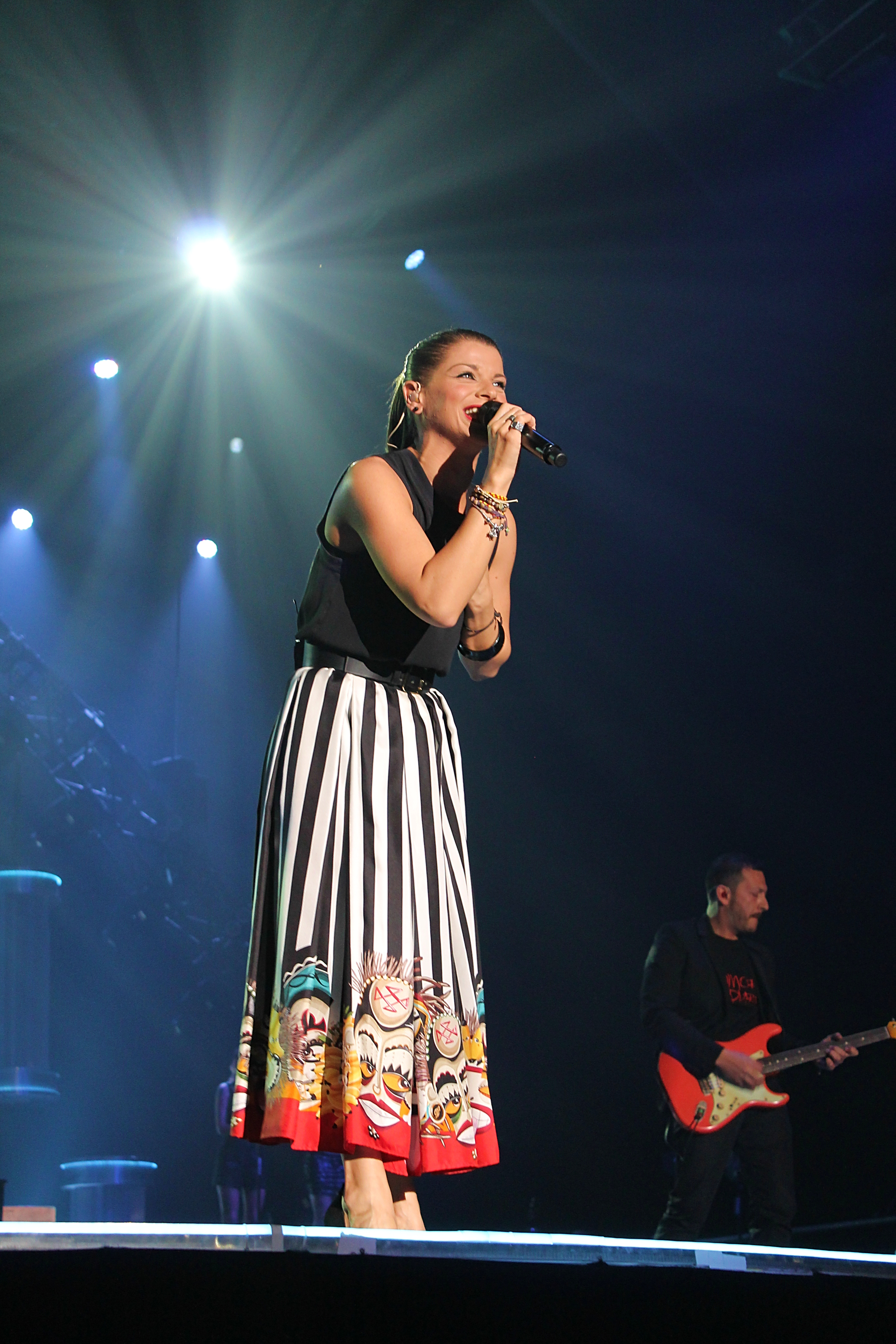
- Alessandra Amoroso
- Pronunciation: [aleˈssandɾa]
- Gender: Feminine
- Language: Italian

Origin
- Meaning: "Defender, protector of womankind"
- Region of origin: Greece

Other names
- Variant form: Alessandrina (Unpopular); Sandra (Diminutive form)
- See also: Alejandra, Alexandra, Alexander, Alex, Alessandro, Alexandru, Alexandre

Alessandra is a feminina given name, the Italian form of the English name Alexandra, derived from the Latin Alexandra and the Ancient Greek Alexándra (Ἀλεξάνδρα), is the feminine form of the name Alessandro. The name Alessandra has other forms in Italian, such as Alessandrina (derived from the Latin Alexandrina) and Sandra (a shortened form of Alessandra).

In Italy, Alessandra was widely popular, especially in Florence, between the second half of the 15th century and the early 17th century. During this period, it was also recorded in archaic variants such as Alexandra or Lessandra. The name experienced a resurgence in the 20th century, rising to rank 5th among Italian girls born in 1976, and was especially common in Rome.

== Notable figures ==
- Alessandra Alores (born 1984), Ukrainian-German model
- Alessandra Amoroso (born 1986), Italian pop/soul singer, songwriter, producer and TV personality
- Alessandra Ambrosio (born 1981), Brazilian supermodel
- Alessandra Beccarisi (born 1974), Italian scholar of the history of philosophy
- Alessandra Biaggi (born 1986), American, New York State Senator
- Alessandra Cappa (born 1981), Italian swimmer
- Alessandra Cappellotto (born 1968), Italian cyclist
- Alessandra de Osma (born 1989), Peruvian attorney and model, and Hanoverian princess by marriage
- Alessandra De Rossi (born 1984), Filipino actress
- Alessandra Ferri (born 1963), Italian ballerina
- Alessandra Fumagalli (born 1998), Italian skeleton racer
- Alessandra Frangipani (born 2003), Italian rugby union player
- Alessandra Gasparelli (born 2004), Sammarinese sprinter
- Alessandra Guillén (born 1997), Venezuelan model
- Alessandra Haber (born 1988), Brazilian politician
- Alessandra Januário dos Santos (born 1988), Brazilian volleyballer
- Alessandra Lunardi (born 1958), Italian mathematician
- Alessandra Mangiacapra (born 1999), Italian karateka
- Alessandra Massa (born 2002), Italian footballer
- Alessandra Mastronardi (born 1986), Italian actress
- Alessandra Mele (born 2002), Norwegian-Italian singer
- Alessandra Mirka Gatti (born 1969), Italian singer
- Alessandra Mussolini (born 1962), Italian politician
- Alessandra Negrini (born 1970), Brazilian actress
- Alessandra Oliveira (swimmer) (born 2008), Brazilian Paralympic swimmer
- Alessandra Paonessa (born 1989), Canadian opera singer
- Alessandra Perilli (born 1988), professional target shooter
- Alessandra Pucci (born 1942), Australian biochemist and entrepreneur
- Alessandra Riegler (born 1961), Italian chess player
- Alessandra Rojo de la Vega (born 1986), Mexican politician, activist, businesswoman, and influencer
- Alessandra Rosaldo (born 1971), Mexican singer and actress
- Alessandra Silvestri-Levy (born 1972), Brazilian art curator and writer
- Alessandra Stanley (born 1955), American journalist
- Alessandra Torresani (born 1987), American actress, also credited by her birth name, Alessandra Toreson
- Flávia Alessandra (born 1974), Brazilian actress, full name Flávia Alessandra Martins da Costa

== People with the surname ==
- Lewis Alessandra (born 1989), English footballer
