= Alessandro =

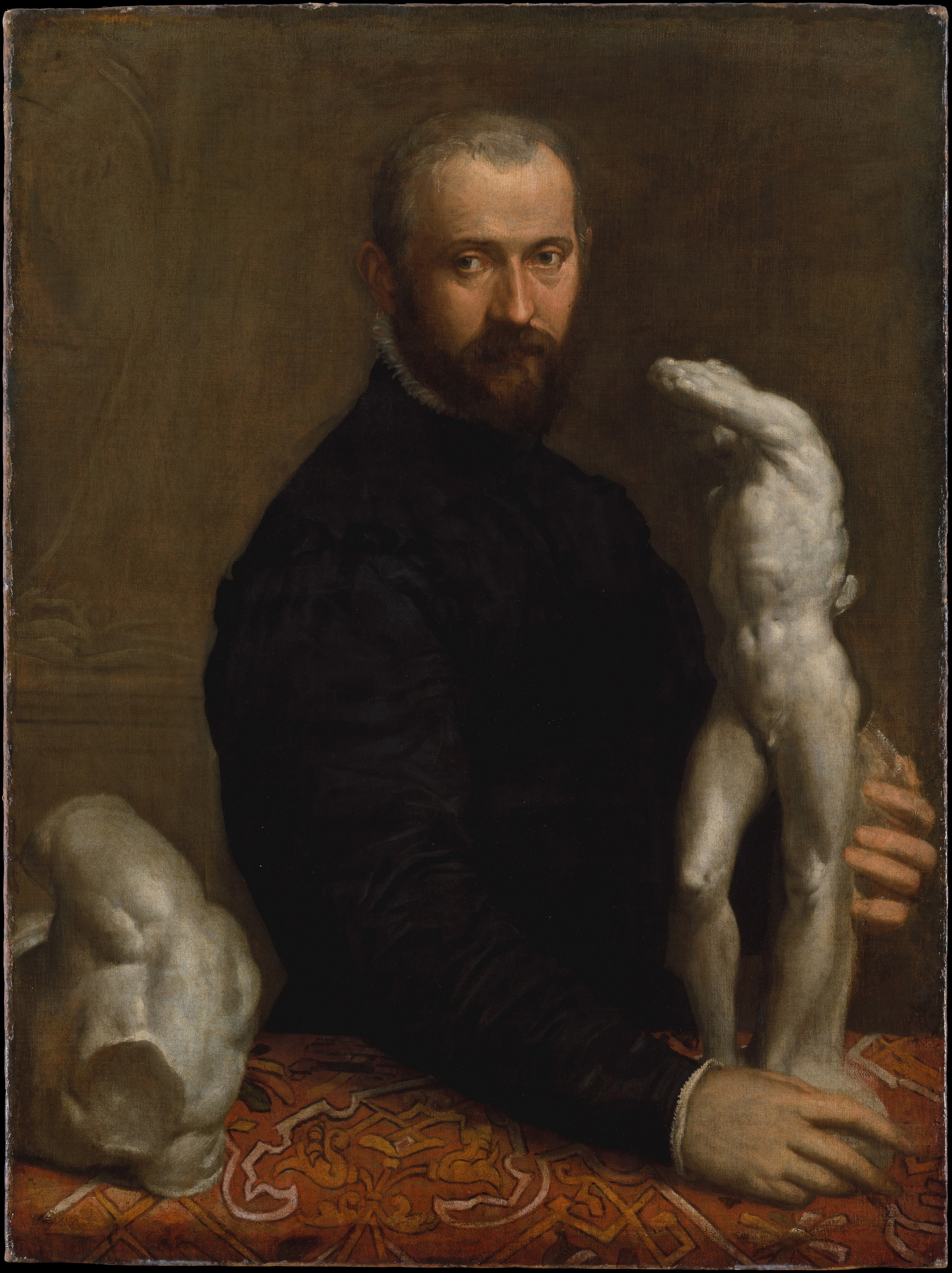
- Alessandro Vittoria
- Pronunciation: [alesˈsandro]
- Gender: Male
- Language: Italian

Origin
- Meaning: Defender of Mankind

Other names
- Nicknames: Ale, Sandro, Sandrino
- Related names: Alessandri (surname); Alessandrini (surname)
- See also: Alexander, Alex, Alejandro, Alexandru, Alexandre

Alessandro is a masculine given name, the Italian form of the English name Alexander, derived from the Latin Alexander and the Ancient Greek Aléxandros (Αλέξανδρος), meaning "defender of man". The name Alessandro became consolidated and predominant in Italy from the Renaissance onward, due to its more fluid phonetic and the influence of historical and literary figures.

The name Alessandro originated from the primary form Alexandro (also the primary form in Spanish and Portuguese), which is attested in medieval documentation. Over time, the "x" was replaced by "ss" to align with Italian phonetics, which favors smooth sibilant sounds. An earlier and archaic predecessor was Alexandrus, derived from medieval Latin. Other archaic forms, such as Sandro (now a hypocoristic), Alisandro, and Alixandro, existed but lacked widespread popularity.

In Italian culture, the name Alessandro enjoys considerable popularity and has given rise to several patronymic surnames, such as Alessandri and Alessandrini. The name Alessandro ranks as the fourth most prevalent derivative of the Greek name Alexandros, following Alexander, Alexandre, and Aleksandr.

== People with the given name ==
- Alessandro Agostinelli (born 1965), Italian poet, writer, and journalist
- Alessandro Agostini (born 1979), Italian footballer
- Alessandro Allori (1535–1607), Italian portrait painter
- Alessandro Barbieri (snowboarder) (born 2008), American snowboarder
- Alessandro Baricco (born 1958), Italian novelist
- Alessandro Bastoni (born 1999), Italian footballer
- Alessandro Bega (born 1991), Italian tennis player
- Alessandro Bordin (born 1998), Italian footballer
- Alessandro Botticelli (1445–1510), Italian painter
- Alessandro Bovo (born 1969), Italian water polo player
- Alessandro Cagliostro (1743–1795), alias of occultist and adventurer Giuseppe Balsamo
- Alessandro Calcaterra (born 1975), Italian water polo player
- Alessandro Calvi (born 1983), Italian swimmer
- Alessandro Carrera (born 1954), Italian poet and translator
- Alessandro Cattelan (born 1980), Italian television presenter
- Alessandro Cortini (born 1976), Italian musician
- Alessandro Criscuolo (1937–2020), Italian judge
- Alessandro Del Piero (born 1974), Italian footballer
- Alessandro Di Munno (born 2000), Italian footballer
- Alessandro Evangelisti (born 1981), Italian footballer
- Alessandro Fontana (1936–2013), Italian academician and politician
- Alessandro Fontanarosa (born 2003), Italian footballer
- Alessandro Georgiou (born 1992), British politician
- Alessandro Giusti (born 2006), French racing driver
- Alessandro Grandi (1586–1630), Italian composer
- Alessandro Hojabrpour (born 2000), Canadian soccer player
- Alessandro Juliani (born 1978), Canadian actor
- Alessandro Vita Kouzkin (born 1992), Russian-Italian race car driver
- Alessandro Lindblad (Alesso) (born 1991), Swedish musician, DJ and producer
- Alessandro Manzoni (1785–1873), Italian poet and novelist
- Alessandro Martelli (1876–1934), Italian academic and politician
- Alessandro Martini (1812–1905), Italian businessman and founder of Martini & Rossi distillery
- Alessandro Matri (born 1984), Italian footballer
- Alessandro de' Medici, Duke of Florence (1510–1537), ruler of Florence from 1530 to 1537
- Alessandro Michieletto (born 2001), Italian volleyball player
- Alessandro Moreschi (1858–1922), only castrato to make solo recordings
- Alessandro Murgia (born 1996), Italian footballer
- Alessandro Mori Nunes (born 1979), Brazilian footballer
- Alessandro Nannini (born 1959), Italian racing driver
- Alessandro Nesta (born 1976), Italian footballer
- Alessandro Nivola (born 1972), American actor
- Alessandro Nunziante (1815–1881), Italian general and politician
- Alessandro D'Ottavio (1927–1988), Italian boxer
- Alessandro Ovalle (born 2005), Dominican footballer
- Alessandro Pagani (born 1937), Italian Roman Catholic bishop
- Alessandro Petacchi (born 1974), Italian professional road cyclist
- Alessandro Pezzatini (born 1957), Italian race walker
- Alessandro Piccolo (agricultural scientist) (born 1951), Italian scientist
- Alessandro Pietrelli (born 2003), Italian footballer
- Alessandro Riggi (born 1993), Canadian soccer player
- Alessandro Ruben (born 1960), Italian politician
- Alessandro Safina (born 1963), Italian tenor
- Alessandro dos Santos (born 1977), Brazilian and naturalised Japanese footballer
- Alessandro Scarlatti (1660–1725), Italian composer
- Alessandro Sebastiani, Italian archaeologist
- Alessandro Serenelli, criminal, gardener, porter and layman
- Alessandro Viana da Silva (born 1982), Brazilian footballer
- Alessandro Stratta (born 1964), celebrity chef
- Alessandro Sturba (born 1972), Italian footballer
- Alessandro Tiarini (1577–1668), Italian painter
- Alessandro de Tomaso (1928–2003), Argentine racing driver and businessman
- Alessandro Trentacinque (1541–1599), Italian writer and jurist
- Alessandro Emanuele "Alex" Treves (1929–2020), Italian-born American Olympic fencer
- Alessandro Venturella (born 1984), British musician
- Alessandro Vogt (born 2003), Swiss footballer
- Alessandro Volta (1745–1827), Italian physicist
- Alex Zanardi (1966–2026), Italian racing driver

== People with the surname ==
- Danilo Alessandro (born 1988), Italian footballer
- Darío Alessandro (1951–2021), Argentine sociologist, politician, and diplomat
- Jonatan Alessandro (born 1987), Argentine footballer
- Kyle Alessandro (born 2006), Norwegian singer
- Victor Alessandro (1915–1976), American orchestra conductor
