= Alexandru =

- Pronunciation: [a.le.ˈksan.dru]
- Gender: Male
- Language: Romanian

Origin
- Meaning: "Defender, protector of mankind"
- Region of origin: Greece

Other names
- Related names: Alexandrescu (Surname)
- See also: Alejandra, Alexandra, Alexander, Alex, Alessandro, Alexandru, Alexandre

Alexandru is a masculine given name, the Romanian form of the English name Alexander, derived from the Latin Alexander and the Ancient Greek Aléxandros (Αλέξανδρος), meaning "defender of mankind". Alexandru is a relatively popular name in Romania and Moldova, deeply rooted in cultural tradition and even reflected in place names such as Alexăndreni.

The name Alexandru also gives rise to patronymic surnames, such as Alexandrescu.

== Origin ==
Etymologically, the name is derived from the Greek "Αλέξανδρος" (Aléxandros), meaning "defending men" or "protector of men", a compound of the verb "ἀλέξω" (alexō), "to ward off, to avert, to defend" and the noun "ἀνδρός" (andros), genitive of "ἀνήρ" (anēr), "man". It is an example of the widespread motif of Greek (or Indo-European more generally) names expressing "battle-prowess", in this case the ability to withstand or push back an enemy battle line.

The earliest attested form of the name is the Mycenaean Greek feminine noun a-re-ka-sa-da-ra, (transliterated as Alexandra), written in Linear B syllabic script.

The name was one of the titles ("epithets") given to the Greek goddess Hera and as such is usually taken to mean "one who comes to save warriors". In the Iliad, the character Paris is known also as Alexander. The name's popularity was spread throughout the Greek world by the military conquests of King Alexander III, commonly known as "Alexander the Great".

== Rulers ==
(in chronological order)

- Alexandru cel Bun (d.1432), Prince of Moldavia 1400–1432
- Alexandru I Aldea (1397–1436), Prince of Wallachia 1431–1436
- Alexandru Lăpușneanu, Voivode of Moldavia (1499–1568)
- Alexandru Lăpușneanu, Prince of Moldavia 1552–1561 and 1564–1568
- Alexandru II Mircea, Hospodar of Wallachia 1568–1574 and 1574–1577
- Alexandru Ghica, Prince of Wallachia 1766–1768
- Alexandru Suțu (1758–1821), Prince of Moldavia and Prince of Wallachia
- Alexandru II Ghica (1796–1862), Prince of Wallachia
- Alexandru Ioan Cuza (1820–1873), Prince of Moldavia, Domnitor of the United Principalities of Wallachia and Moldavia 1859–1866

== Prime ministers ==
- Alexandru Athanasiu
- Alexandru Averescu
- Alexandru G. Golescu
- Alexandru Marghiloman
- Alexandru Munteanu
- Alexandru Vaida-Voevod

== Religious leaders ==
- Alexandru Sterca-Șuluțiu
- Alexandru Șafran
- Alexandru Todea

== Other people ==
- Alexandru Antemireanu
- Alexandru Antoniuc
- Alexandru Apolzan
- Alexandru Balaban
- Alexandru Baltagă
- Alexandru Batcu
- Alexandru Bogdan-Pitești
- Alexandru Borza
- Alexandru Candiano-Popescu
- Alexandru Cantacuzino (militant)
- Alexandru Cantacuzino (minister)
- Alexandru Caraman
- Alexandru Cecal
- Alexandru Ștefan Catargiu
- Alexandru Cernat
- Alexandru Ciucurencu
- Alexandru Ciura
- Alexandru Ciurcu
- Alexandru Claudian
- Alexandru C. Constantinescu
- Alexandru Dabija
- Alexandru Darie
- Alexandru Davila
- Alexandru Dimca
- Alexandru Dincă (journalist)
- Alexandru Dobriceanu
- Alexandru Dobrogeanu-Gherea
- Alexandru Dragomir
- Alexandru Epureanu
- Alecu Filipescu-Vulpea
- Alexandru Fölker
- Alexandru Frim
- Alexandru Froda
- Alexandru Gațcan
- Alexandru George
- Alexandru Gheorghiaș
- Alexandru Ghiban
- Alexandru Ghika
- Alexandru Giugaru
- Alexandru Golban
- Alexandru Graur
- Alexandru Greab
- Alexandru Groapă
- Alexandru Hrisoverghi
- Alexandru Ioanițiu
- Alexandru Koller
- Alexandru Leșco
- Alexandru Ioan Lupaș
- Alexandru Macedonski
- Alexandru Mandy
- Alexandru Marin (disambiguation)
- Alexandru Mironescu
- Alexandru Moghioroș
- Alexandru Ioan Morțun
- Alexandru Moșanu
- Alexandru Nicolschi
- Alexandru Odobescu
- Alexandru Orăscu
- Alexandru Paleologu
- Alexandru Papadopol
- Alexandru Papadopol-Calimah
- Alexandru Papiu Ilarian
- Alexandru Pastia
- Alexandru Pesamosca
- Alexandru Philippide
- Alexandru A. Philippide
- Alexandru Plămădeală
- Alexandru Popovici (Moldovan footballer)
- Alexandru Adrian Popovici
- Alexandru Proca
- Alexandru Repan
- Alexandru Rogobete
- Alexandru Sahia
- Alexandru Sătmăreanu
- Alexandru Săvulescu (architect)
- Alexandru Șerbănescu
- Alexandru Șoltoianu
- Alexandru Stănică
- Alexandru Sturdza
- Alexandru Suciu
- Alexandru A. Suțu
- Alexandru Terheș
- Alexandru Toma
- Alexandru Tudor-Miu
- Alexandru Tudose
- Alexandru Tyroler
- Alexandru Usatiuc-Bulgăr
- Alexandru Vulpe
- Alexandru Dimitrie Xenopol
- Alexandru Zaharescu
- Alexandru Zub

== People with the surname ==
- Constantin Alexandru (1953–2014), Romanian sport wrestler
- Iliaș Alexandru, Ruler of Moldova
- Ioan Alexandru (1941–2000), Romanian poet and politician
- Maria Alexandru (1939–2024), Romanian table tennis player
- Marian Alexandru (born 1977), Romanian footballer
- Nicoleta Alexandru (born 1968), Romanian singer
- Sadie Alexandru (born 1977), American actress and model
- Valentin Alexandru (born 1991), Romanian footballer
- Vasile Alexandru (born 1935), Romanian footballer
