= Alexandro =

Alexandro is a masculine given name that served as a calque for Alessandro in Italian and Alejandro in Spanish, while also existing historically in Portuguese, French, and other languages. This form is the most closely aligned with the original Greek Aléxandros (Ἀλέξανδρος), meaning "defender of men," whereas variants such as Alexandre and Aleksandr represent closer approximations to the Latin Alexander, reflecting phonetic and orthographic adaptations in their respective linguistic traditions. Notable people with the name Alexandro include:

- Alexandro Álvarez (born 1977), Mexican footballer
- Alexandro Alves do Nascimento (1974–2012), Brazilian footballer
- Alexandro Cavagnera (born 1998), Belgian footballer
- Alexandro da Silva Batista (born 1986), Brazilian footballer
- Alexandro Maidana (born 2005), Paraguayan footballer
- Ted Alexandro (born 1969), American comedian

== See also ==
- Alejandro
- Alexandre (disambiguation)
- Alexandros (disambiguation)
