= Alessandro Sebastiani =

Italian archaeologist

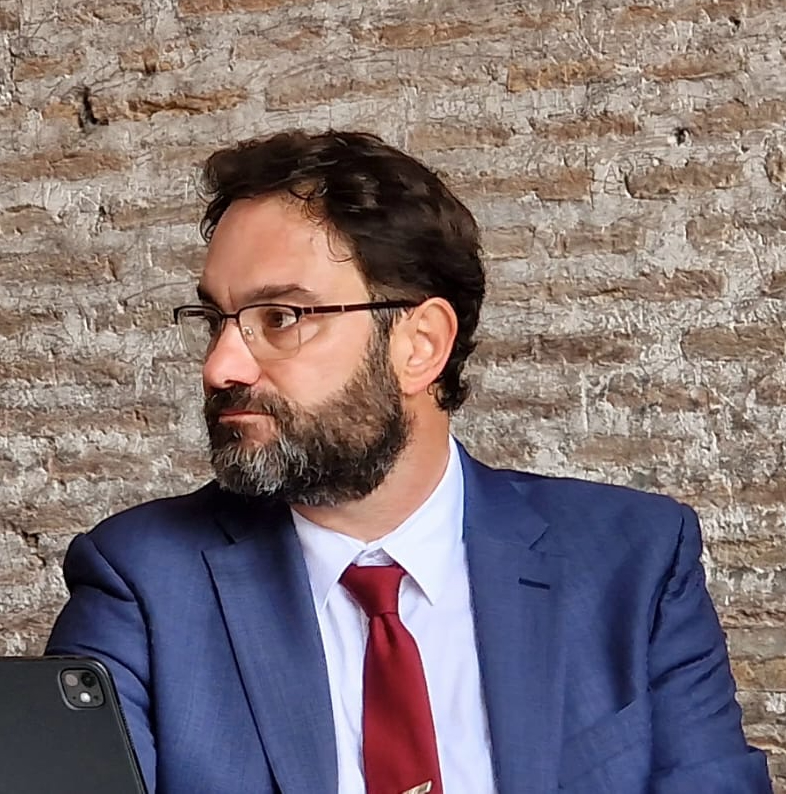
- Born: 1981 (age 44–45); Grosseto, Tuscany, Italy
- Education: University of Siena
- Known for: IMPERO Project; studies on ideological placemaking in modern Italy
- Scientific career
- Fields: Roman archaeology; landscape archaeology
- Workplaces: University at Buffalo

Alessandro Sebastiani (born 1981) is an Italian archaeologist and associate professor of roman archaeology at the University at Buffalo, State University of New York (SUNY). His research focuses on Roman and late antique Italy, landscape archaeology, sanctuaries, and rural settlement patterns in southern Tuscany. He is also known for his work on the ideological reuse of classical architecture in modern Italy through his monographs on nation-building and the manipulation of Roman antiquity from the Risorgimento to the Fascist era.

== Early life and education ==
Alessandro Sebastiani studied medieval archaeology at the University of Siena with Riccardo Francovich as his main advisor, where he earned his bachelor's and master's degrees, and PhD.

== Academic career ==
In 2007, he served as a research associate at the University of Nottingham, and in 2008 at the Penn Museum in Philadelphia. He worked for the Butrint Foundation at the University of East Anglia in 2009 before starting an independent archaeological project in the Maremma Regional Park. From 2012 to 2014, he held a EU-funded Marie Skłodowska-Curie Postdoctoral Fellowship at the Department of Archaeology of the University of Sheffield.

In 2014, he received a Rakow Grant for Glass Research from the Corning Museum of Glass. He served as Visiting Professor of Classical Archaeology at Charles University in Prague during the academic years 2015–2016.

Sebastiani joined the University at Buffalo in 2017 as Assistant Professor of Roman Archaeology. He was promoted to Associate Professor in 2023, and became Chair of the Department of Classics in 2025. He held a Visiting Professorship at the University Tor Vergata of Rome in 2024.

== Research ==
Sebastiani's research encompasses the archaeology of central and southern Etruria from the Hellenistic to the medieval period, combining excavation, landscape archaeology, geoarchaeology, and digital documentation.

A major component of his scholarship concerns the reception and reinterpretation of ancient Rome in modern Italy. His monographs Ancient Rome and the Modern Italian State. Ideological Placemaking, Archaeology, and Architecture, 1870–1945 and Roma antica e l'identità nazionale italiana. Trasformazioni di una città dal Risorgimento al Fascismo analyze the ideological use of classical architectural forms and the reshaping of Rome's monumental landscape between the Kingdom of Italy and the Fascist era. These works articulate the theoretical framework of ideological placemaking and the political manipulation of classical imagery.

== Fieldwork ==
Sebastiani directs several excavations and survey projects within the IMPERO Project (Interconnected Mobility of People and Economy along the River Ombrone), including:

- Podere Cannicci (Civitella Paganico) – a late Etruscan and Republican vicus with a sanctuary and necropolis
- Castellaraccio di Monteverdi – a medieval fortified settlement
- Rusellae – an Etruscan, Roman, and medieval city with late antique and medieval urban and funerary phases

These projects are conducted in collaboration with Italian heritage authorities and international institutions and host annual archaeological field schools.

As part of the IMPERO Project, Sebastiani has also conducted extensive archaeological fieldwork in the territory of Alberese (Grosseto), in projects co-directed with the Soprintendenza Archeologia della Toscana, together with archaeologists Elena Chirico and Matteo Colombini. These excavations have contributed significantly to reconstructing ritual, economic, and settlement patterns in the lower Ombrone valley between the Hellenistic and late antique periods.

The investigations brought to light:

- Sanctuary of Diana Umbronensis at Scoglietto – an extra-urban cult site active from the 2nd century BCE to the 6th century CE, with architectural phases, votive deposits, and evidence of long-term ritual continuity and transformation.
- Manufacturing district of Spolverino – a productive complex active between the late 1st and 5th centuries CE, featuring collective kitchens, artisanal installations, food-processing structures, and domestic cult contexts, including a well-preserved lararium.
- Umbro Flumen positio – a settlement and infrastructural node occupied from the late 3rd century BCE to the 6th century CE, strategically located at the mouth of the Ombrone River and tied to regional mobility, transport, and economic networks.

These discoveries form a core dataset for the integrated research agenda of the IMPERO Project and provide a long-term perspective on continuity and change in the riverine landscapes of southern Tuscany.

Beyond the IMPERO Project, Sebastiani has contributed to several international and collaborative archaeological initiatives. He participated in the research program Paesaggi Medievali at the University of Siena, and took part in the archaeological excavations at the UNESCO World Heritage Site of Butrint in Albania. He also joined the survey activities of the Crowded Desert Project (University College London Qatar), focused on settlement systems and cultural landscapes in the Arabian Peninsula.

During his early career, Sebastiani volunteered in numerous archaeological excavations across Tuscany, including at Castel di Pietra, Selvena, the medieval castles of Miranduolo, Staggia Senese and Poggibonsi, as well as in the urban excavations of Grosseto and at the complex of Santa Maria della Scala in Siena.

== Publications ==
Sebastiani is the author or editor of several volumes on Roman and late antique archaeology. His most recent books include:

- Ancient Rome and the Modern Italian State (Cambridge University Press, 2023)
- Roma antica e l'identità nazionale italiana (Carocci, 2024)
- Archaeological Landscapes of Roman Etruria. Research and Field Papers (Brepols, 2021)
- Archaeological Landscapes of Late Antique and Early Medieval Tuscia. Research and Field Papers (Brepols, 2023)
- Sacred Landscapes in Central Italy. Votive Deposits and Sanctuaries (400 BC – AD 400) (Brepols, 2025)

He has published articles in international journals and contributed chapters to edited volumes on Roman Italy, Etruria, landscape archaeology, and archaeological theory. He is the founder and co-editor of the Mediterraneo Toscano (MediTo) series published by Brepols.

== Public outreach ==
Sebastiani collaborates with local municipalities, museums, and heritage institutions in Tuscany to promote public archaeology, open-day events, and exhibitions related to his fieldwork. He has coordinated heritage communication initiatives, including the design and implementation of the interpretive panel system for the historic center of Paganico (Grosseto), developed in partnership with the local administration.

In addition to his local outreach, Sebastiani has played a central role in shaping the scholarly conversation around the IMPERO Project's research themes. He has organized international conferences and workshops that brought together leading specialists in Roman, late antique, and medieval archaeology. The proceedings of these meetings have been published in the MediTo series, contributing to the broader dissemination of the project's theoretical and methodological advances and strengthening its international visibility.

He has also participated in international meetings on cultural heritage in Saudi Arabia, contributing to discussions on heritage policy, archaeological practice, and the development of sustainable frameworks for cultural preservation.

== Selected bibliography ==
- Ancient Rome and the Modern Italian State. Ideological Placemaking, Archaeology, and Architecture (1870–1945) (2023), Cambridge University Press.
- Roma antica e l'identità nazionale italiana. Trasformazioni di una città dal Risorgimento al fascismo (2024), Carocci Editore.
- Archaeological Landscapes of Late Antique and Early Medieval Tuscia. Research and Field Papers (2023), Brepols.
- Sacred Landscapes in Central Italy. Votive Deposits and Sanctuaries (400 BC – AD 400) (2025), Brepols.
- Adriano. L'Imperatore Buono (2022), Mondadori Editore.
- Archaeological Landscapes of Roman Etruria. Research and Field Papers (2021), Brepols.
- Diana Umbronensis a Scoglietto. Santuario, Territorio e Cultura Materiale (200 a.C. – 550 d.C) (2015), Archaeopress.

== See also ==
- Roman archaeology
- Landscape archaeology
- Etruria
- University at Buffalo
