= Abbey of San Rabano =

- Monasterium Arborense
- Abbazia di San Rabano (Italian)
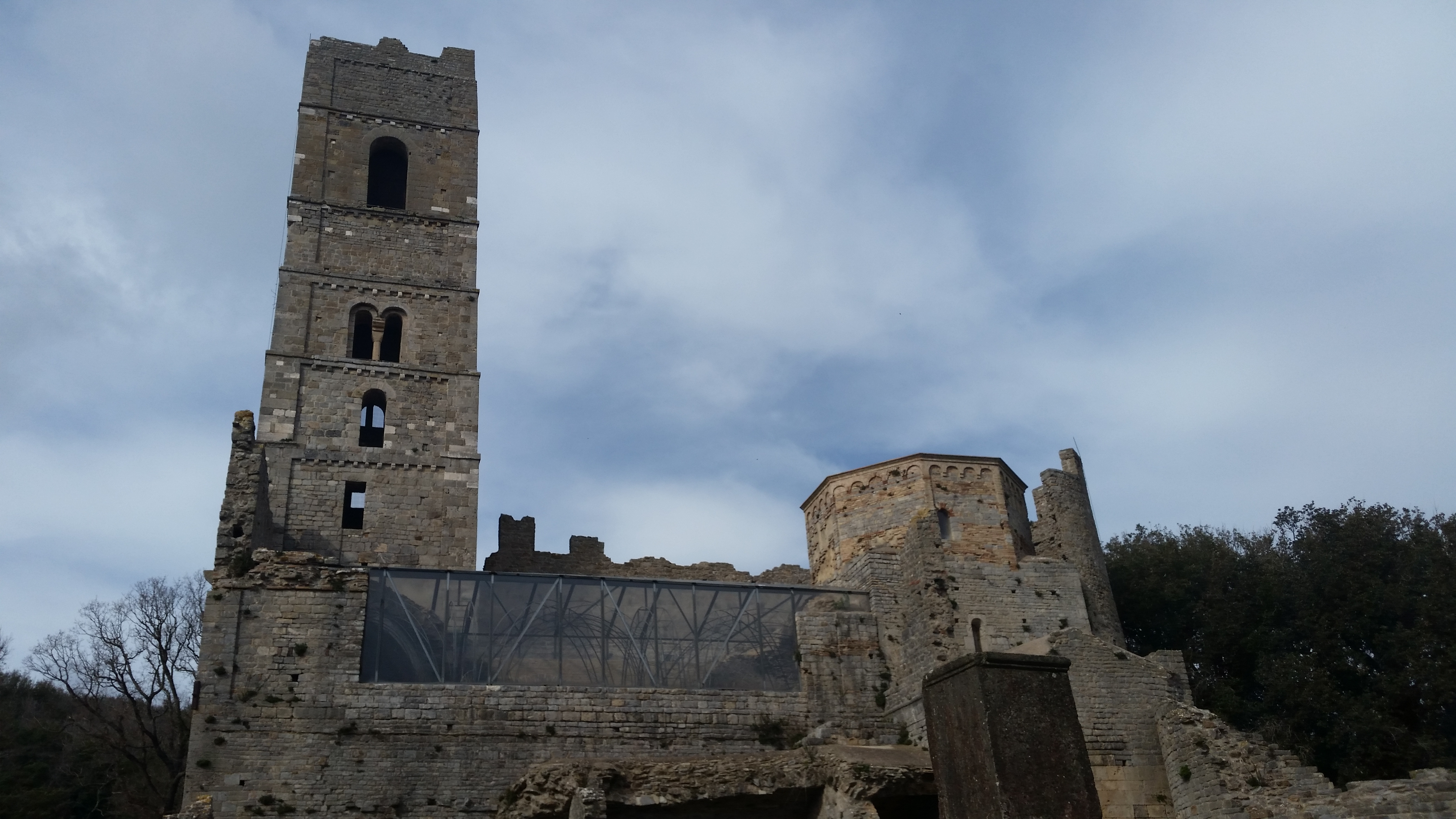
- Abbey of San Rabano
- 42°38′06.4″N 11°05′47.05″E
- Location: Uccellina Mountains, Maremma Regional Park; Grosseto, Tuscany
- Country: Italy
- Denomination: Roman Catholic

Architecture
- Architectural type: Abbey
- Style: Romanesque

The Abbey of San Rabano is a historical site in Grosseto, located on a ridge near Poggio Lecci and Poggio Alto in the Maremma Regional Park, Tuscany.

== History ==
Founded around 1100, this Benedictine monastery was strategically situated along the ancient Strada della Regina (Queen's Road), linking the Via Aurelia with the port of Cala di Forno. The abbey was named Monasterium Arborense or de Arboresio, from which the later Alberese estate derives its name.

During its peak in the 13th century, San Rabano flourished as a significant religious and administrative center. The abbey controlled approximately 6,000 hectares of land, including forests, salt pans, farmlands, hunting reserves, and fishing ports. It functioned similarly to a small town, with facilities such as a library, notary office, pharmacy, workshops, and accommodation for travelers.

The abbey's prosperity declined in the 14th century due to the Black Death, which led to a shift from agriculture to livestock, hunting, and fishing. Siena's growing influence and competition from new urban religious orders further exacerbated its decline. In 1303, the Hospitallers of St. John of Jerusalem took over the abbey and fortified it. By 1439, the Sienese dismantled the fortress, converting the abbey into an agricultural estate. The Hospitallers eventually relocated to Alberese.

Abandoned and largely forgotten, the name "San Rabano" was mistakenly assigned much later, derived from "Sancti Rabani Praeceptor", who built the Alberese church in 1587 and was believed to be the last abbot of the abbey between the 17th and 19th centuries. The abbey's ruins were rediscovered in the 20th century. Restoration efforts began in 1972, and the establishment of Maremma Regional Park in 1975 helped attract visitors. Today, the site features a restored church and accessible ruins, including the inner courtyard, ovens, service rooms, guest quarters, and monk's lodgings, allowing visitors to envision the abbey as it was eight centuries ago.

== Sources ==
- Citter, Carlo (1996). Guida agli edifici sacri della Maremma. Abbazie monasteri, pievi e chiese medievali della provincia di Grosseto. Siena: Nuova Immagine.
- Parisi, Marcella (2001). Grosseto dentro e fuori porta. L'emozione e il pensiero. Siena: C&P Adver Effigi.
