= Alexandre (given name) =

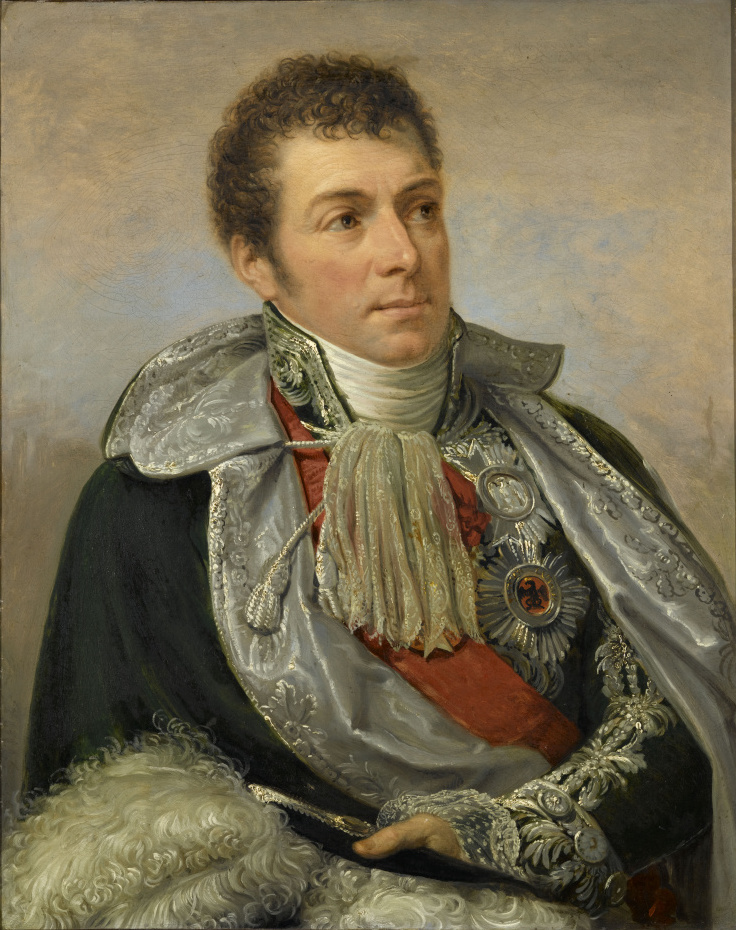
- Alexandre Berthier
- Pronunciation: French: [alɛksɑ̃dʁ]; European Portuguese: [ɐlɨˈʃɐ̃dɾɨ]; Brazilian Portuguese: [aleˈʃɐ̃dɾi]
- Gender: Male
- Language: French, Portuguese, Galician, Catalan

Origin
- Meaning: Defender of Mankind or Warrior

Other names
- Nicknames: Alex, Andre (French); Alê, Alex, Xande, Dre (Portuguese)
- Related names: Alexandres (Portuguese surname); Alexandrino (Portuguese surname); Alexandrí (Catalan surname)
- See also: Alexander, Alex, Alessandro, Alexandru, Alejandro

Alexandre is a masculine given name, the French, Galician, Catalan, and Portuguese form of the English name Alexander, derived from the Latin Alexander and the Ancient Greek Aléxandros (Αλέξανδρος), meaning "defender of Mankind". The name Alexandre emerged in Galician, Portuguese, and Catalan through a calque from Old Galician-Portuguese, which was derived from the French form inaugural Alexandre.

Alexandre is a culturally French name, popular among the French elite, with notable figures such as Alexandre de Beauharnais and Alexandre Dumas. The name Alexandre is also popular in Luso-Brazilian culture, with figures like Alexandre de Gusmão and Alexandre de Serpa Pinto. There are notable figures from sporadic contexts, such as the Haitian revolutionary Alexandre Pétion.

== Variations ==
=== French ===
The name Alexandre became consolidated and established in Middle French (14th–15th centuries), influenced by orthographic standardization and the growing impact of classical texts during the Renaissance. However, the name had already manifested in archaic forms such as Alisandre and Alixandre, documented in medieval literature. The French form served as a calque for the Galician, Portuguese, and Catalan languages.

=== Portuguese ===
The earliest form of the name in the Portuguese language was Alexandro, a rendition derived from the translation of name of Alexander the Great by Luís de Camões, closely aligned with the original Greek Aléxandros (Ἀλέξανδρος). Subsequently, following the adoption of the French form Alexandre in the Galician language, which supplanted Alexandro, Portuguese followed suit in embracing this adaptation. Within Lusophone linguistic traditions, the name Alexandre has given rise to several patronymic surnames, such as Alexandres (meaning "son of Alexandre," analogous to the Spanish Alejándrez) and Alexandrino, a more historical form rooted in the Latin Alexandrinus ("little Alexandre" or "son of Alexandre"). Globally, Alexandre ranks as the second most prevalent derivative of the Greek Aléxandros, surpassed only by Alexander in terms of widespread usage and cultural prominence.

== People ==
- Prince Alexandre of Belgium (1942–2009)
- Alexandre, Chevalier de Chaumont (1640–1710), French ambassador
- Alexandre, vicomte Digeon (1771–1826), cavalry officer in the French Revolutionary Wars
- Alexandre Aja (born 1978), French film director
- Alexandre Arenate (born 1995), Guadeloupean footballer
- Alexandre Baptista, Portuguese footballer
- Alexandre Batta (1816-1902), Dutch cellist
- Alexandre de Beauharnais (1760-1794), French political figure and general during the French Revolution
- Alexandre Bilodeau (born 1987), Canadian skier
- Alexandre Bissonnette, Canadian terrorist
- Alexandre Brasseur (born 1971), French actor
- Alexandre Bussière, Canadian cinematographer
- Alexandre Cingria (1879–1945), Swiss artist
- Alexandre Desplat, French film composer
- Alexandre Cédric Doucet, Canadian politician
- Alexandre Dupuis (born 1990), Canadian football player
- Alexandre Dumas (1802–1870), French writer
- Alexandre Gustave Eiffel (1832–1923), French civil engineer, best known for the Eiffel tower
- Alexandre Farnoux, French historian and Minoan archaeologist
- Alexandre Gaydamak, French businessman, co-owner and chairman of Portsmouth F.C.
- Alexandre Herculano, Portuguese novelist and historian
- Alexandre Knoploch (born 1986), Brazilian politician
- Alexandre Lacazette, French footballer for Arsenal F.C.
- Alexandre Leite (born 1989), Brazilian politician
- Alexandre Lippmann (1881–1960), French 2x Olympic champion épée fencer
- Alexandre Sarnes Negrão, Brazilian race car driver
- Alexandre José Oliveira, Spanish-Brazilian football player
- Alexandre Lloveras (born 2000), French para-cyclist
- Alexandre Ndoye, French basketball player
- Alexandre O'Neill, Portuguese poet
- Alexandre Padilha (born 1971), Brazilian physician and politician
- Alexandre Pétion, Haitian President
- Alexandre Pantoja, UFC Fighter
- Alexandre Pato, Brazilian footballer
- Alexandre Portier (born 1990), French politician
- Alexandre Quintanilha, Portuguese scientist
- Alexandre de Serpa Pinto, Portuguese explorer
- Alexandre Alves da Silva, Brazilian football player
- Alex Song, Cameroonian football player
- Alexandre Sperafico, Brazilian driver
- Alexandre Texier (born 1999), French ice hockey player
- Alexandre Trudeau, Canadian filmmaker and journalist
- Alexandre Vauthier, French fashion designer
- Alexandre Vincendet (born 1983), French politician
- Alexandre Yersin (1863–1943), Swiss-French doctor, explorer and bacteriologist
- Alexandre Yokochi, Portuguese swimmer
- Philippe Alexandre Autexier (1954–1998), French music historian and masonic researcher
