= Alberese =

- Frazione
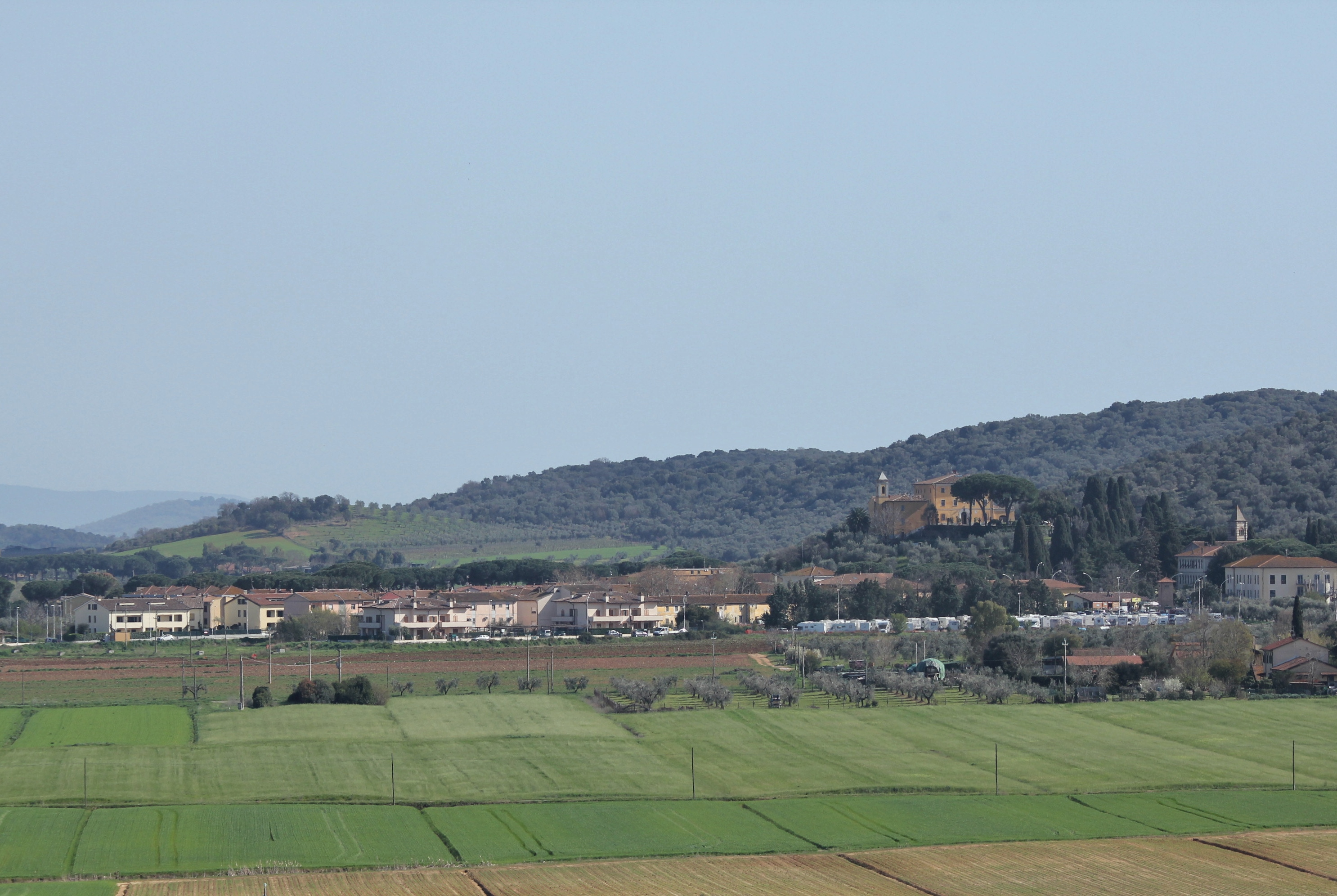
- View of Alberese

- Location of Alberese in Italy
- Coordinates: 42°40′10″N 11°06′22″E
- Country: Italy
- Region: Tuscany
- Province: Grosseto (GR)
- Comune: Grosseto
- Elevation: 42 m (138 ft)

Population (2010)
  - Total: 1,176
- Demonym: Alberesani
- Time zone: UTC+1 (CET)
  - Summer (DST): UTC+2 (CEST)
- Postal code: 58100
- Dialing code: 0564

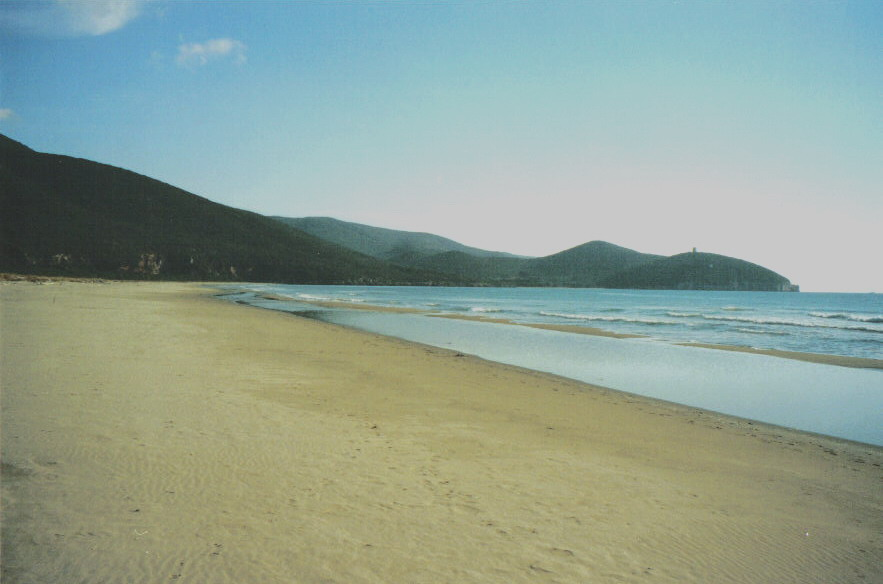
Marina di Alberese

Alberese (Italian: [albeˈreːze]) is an Italian rural town in southern Tuscany, a frazione of the comune of Grosseto. It is situated 20 km south-east of the capital, in the heart of the Maremma Regional Park. This area includes the surrounding rural territories which begin with the first foot-hills of the hinterland and end with the sea, crossing the northern peaks of the Uccellina Mountains.

== History ==
Even during prehistory some ancient caves were inhabited, such as that of the Scoglietto, which conserves traces of even more recent life (Bronze Age, Roman period), Etruscan (Poggio Raso) and Roman (Santa Francesca, Le Frasche) remains are present mainly towards Talamone and along Via Aurelia.

The modern rural residence area, dominated by the imposing mass of the Villa Granducale, was developed in the last two centuries, thanks to the freehold Reform and to the allocation of the territories to farmers, most coming from Veneto and Northern Italy.

== Environment ==
In spite of the presence of man, the natural surrounding havens, with their heritage of game reserves and large flower expanses, have been saved. At present, the body of the Natural Park of Maremma and a series of regional laws allow to safeguard conservation and the lasting of these beauties.

Herds of wild horses and Maremmana cows still scamper among the wide fields while deer and wild boars live undisturbed within the dense forests of the Uccellina Mountains. Within the Park there is not only uncontaminated nature but numerous and sometimes evident are the signs of man's presence in various periods.

In every season the exterminated country-side becomes alive again with the colours of nature; ochre in autumn and in winter, green in spring and yellow in summer. This is the time when expanses of sunflowers are alternated to fields of wheat. In the sunny summer days it is not uncommon to run into the phenomenon of the Fata Morgana crossing bare-foot the long and straight nearby roads.

=== Climate ===
The climate of the locality and of the Alberese area presents characteristics of the Mediterranean climate, more marked along the coastal area and lightly attenuated in the plain area in which the centre stands. This is due to the presence, from west, of the Uccellina Mountains which create a limited barrier effect from the mitigation action of the sea. The medium temperatures in January are testified at around +7 °C, while in July temperatures exceed 22 °C. On average the values are a bit inferior, mainly in the summer season, to those registered at the two weather stations in Grosseto. In comparison to the capital, average annual precipitations result to be inferior, both in quantity (600 mm per year) and in frequency (62 days per year with at least 1 mm). Rain results to be very scarce during the three-month summer season (on average about 60 mm in just 7 days).

== Main sights ==
- Villa Granducale di Alberese
- Church of Sant'Antonio Abate
- Church of Santa Maria
- Abbey of San Rabano
- Hermitage of Uccellina
- Tower of Uccellina
- Tower of Castel Marino
- Tower of Collelungo
- Temple of Diana Umbronensis (Scoglietto archaeological site)

== Transports ==
- Alberese railway station

== Bibliography ==
- Aldo Mazzolai. Guida della Maremma. Percorsi tra arte e natura. Florence, Le Lettere, 1997.
- Giuseppe Guerrini. Torri e Castelli della Provincia di Grosseto. Siena, Nuova Immagine Editrice, 1999.
- Marcella Parisi. Grosseto dentro e fuori porta. L'emozione e il pensiero. Siena, C&P Adver Effigi, 2001.

== See also ==
- Grosseto
- Maremma
- Batignano
- Braccagni
- Istia d'Ombrone
- Marina di Grosseto
- Montepescali
- Principina a Mare
- Principina Terra
- Rispescia
- Roselle, Italy
