= Alberese railway station =

Railway station in Italy

Alberese
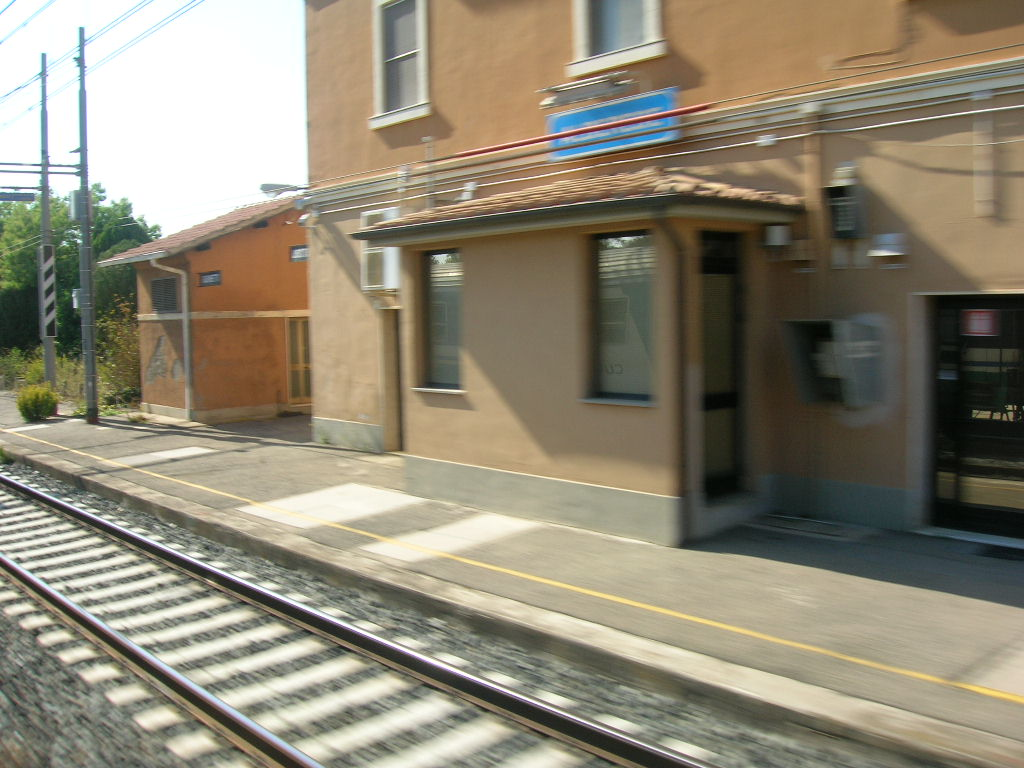

General information
- Location: Strada provinciale 59 Alberese; Alberese Scalo 58051; Magliano in Toscana, Grosseto, Tuscany; Italy
- Coordinates: 42°38′21.6″N 11°08′03″E
- Operator: Rete Ferroviaria Italiana; Trenitalia
- Line: Tirrenica
- Tracks: 2

History
- Opened: 15 June 1864; 162 years ago
- Closed: 2000; 26 years ago
Location
- Location within Tuscany Location within Italy

Alberese railway station is a disused Italian railway station on the Tirrenica railway line, located south to the village of Alberese, at the border between the municipalities of Grosseto and Magliano in Toscana, Province of Grosseto, Tuscany.

== History ==
The station opened on 15 June 1864 along with the section of the Pisa–Rome railway from Follonica to Orbetello. In the early 2000s, the station was closed due to low passenger traffic.

== Train services and movements ==
The station is no longer part of the regional passenger train service and is only served by buses. In the square in front of the railway station, there is the bus terminal for services between Grosseto and Alberese, operated by Tiemme Toscana Mobilità.

== See also ==
- History of rail transport in Italy
- List of railway stations in Tuscany
- Rail transport in Italy
- Railway stations in Italy
