= Festival del Viaggio =

Cultural festival in Italy

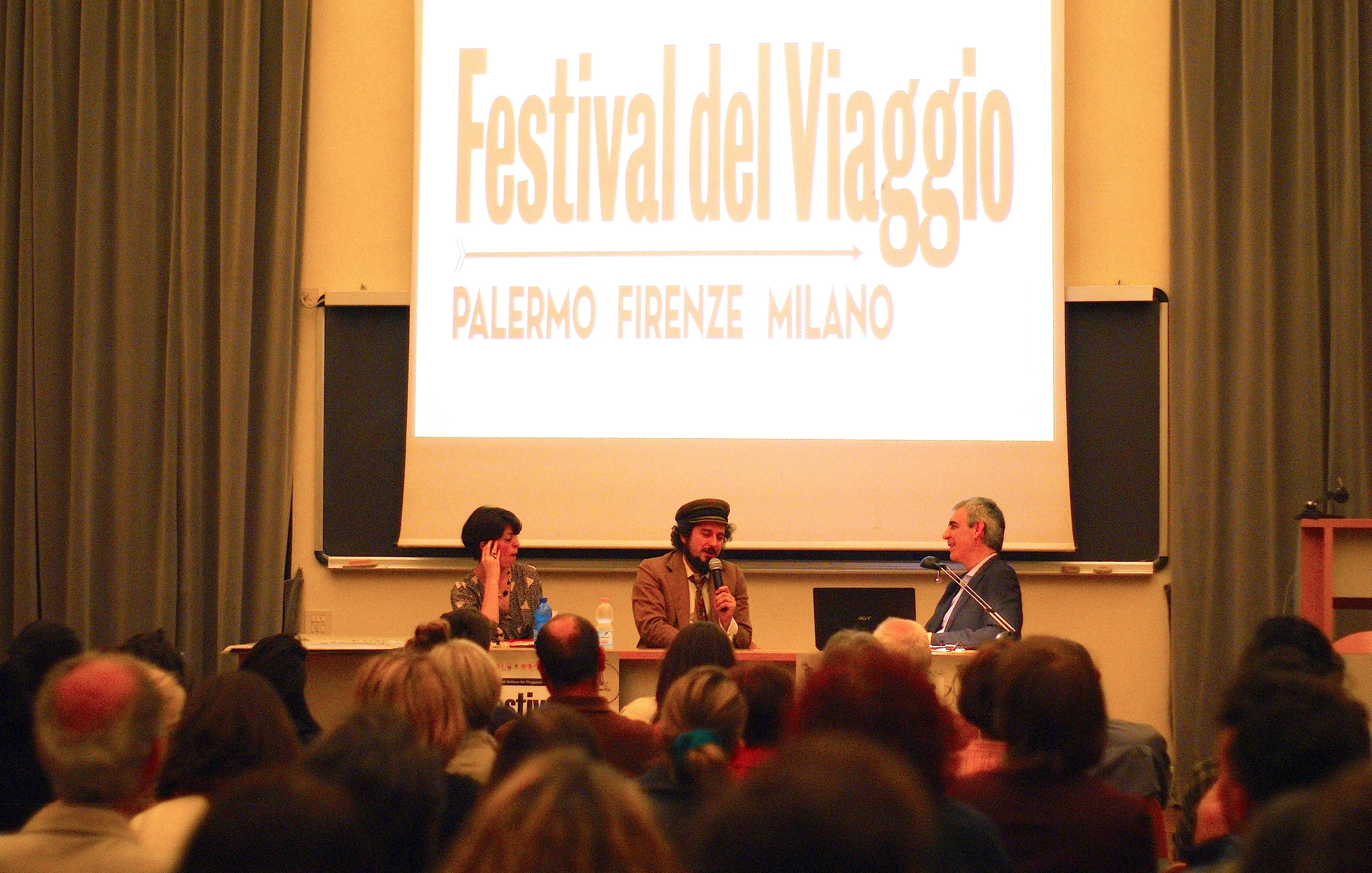
Vinicio Capossela talks about his travel experiences at the 2013 edition, hosted at the Museum of Anthropology and Ethnology of Florence.

The Festival del Viaggio (in English: Travel festival) is an annual cultural festival held each June in different locations In Italy mostly Pisa or Florence (amongst other location were also Viareggio or Palermo.) The festival features a vast array of conferences, exhibitions, concerts, movies, and documentaries about traveling. It also organizes workshops on writing and photography about travel, in collaborations with the University of Pisa and the province of Florence. It was the first of its kind in Italy.

== History ==
The festival was founded in 2006 by writer Alessandro Agostinelli, who is the current director.

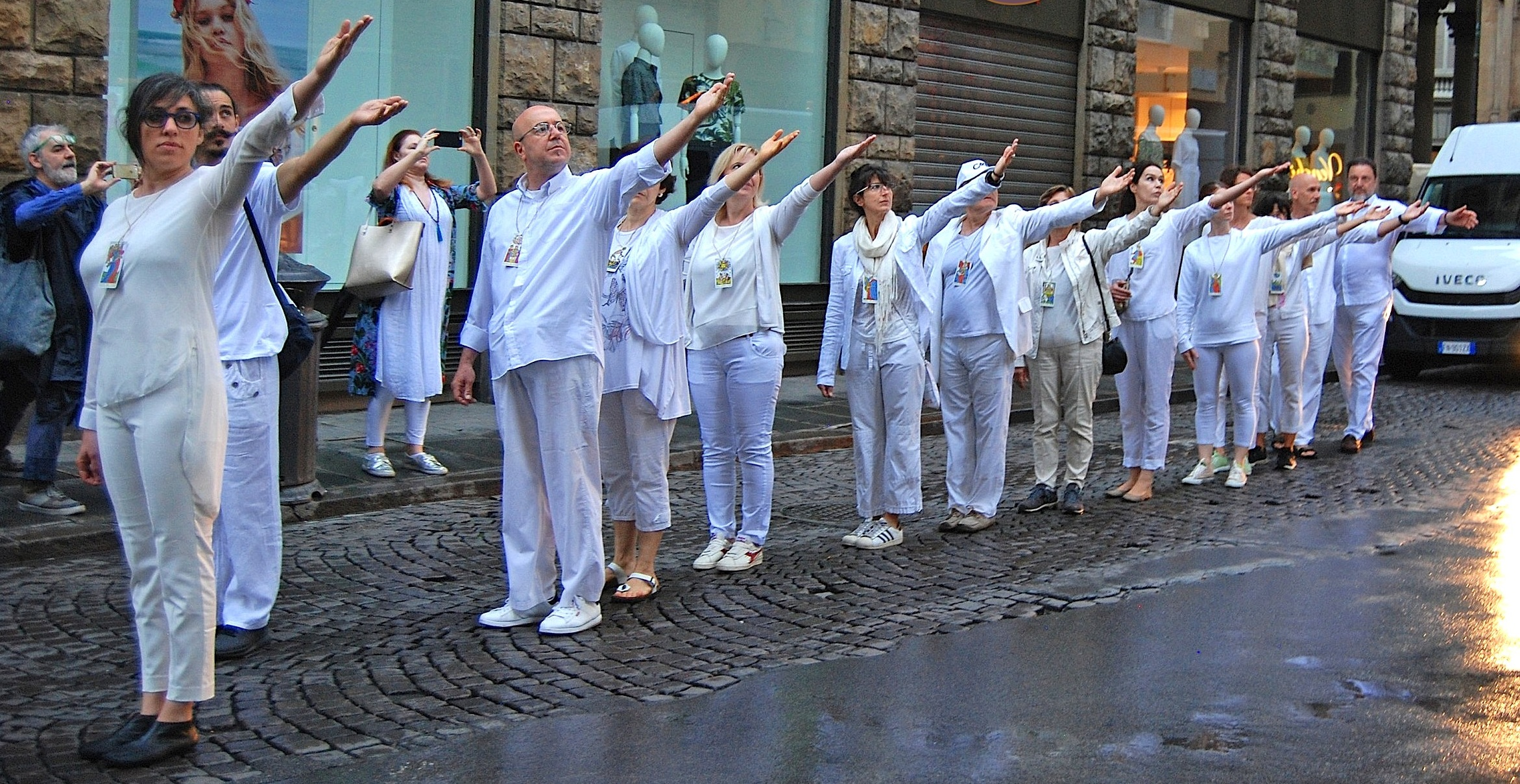
The "Passeggiata Jodorowski" at the 2018 edition, in Florence

In 2009 Festival del Viaggio won the "Brand New Italian Festival Award" in Bologna. In 2010 the festival presented a walk in the Florentine sky: the tightrope walker Andrea Loreni walked on the wire 50 meters high over Piazza della Signoria, entering into the Palazzo Vecchio. In 2011 festival organized a photo contest about honeymoons all over the world, in collaborations with the weekly magazine L'Espresso and the daily newspaper La Repubblica. In 2018 the Festival del Viaggio conceived and realized the plan of the 'Passeggiata Jodorowski', a walk at dawn amongst the most important Florentine monuments going always straight and never turning (inspired by Alejandro Jodorowski's idea). In September 2019 Viareggio was chosen as an additional seat.

The 2020 edition was postponed to September and featured more open-air and online events.

The 2025 edition took place in September at Palazzo Blu and was entirely dedicated to music.

== Notable guests ==
The following people were involved to describe their experience as travellers

- Bandabardò
- Alessandro Benvenuti
- Giulio Borrelli
- Vinicio Capossela
- Sergio Caputo
- Franco Cardini
- Paolo Crepet
- Philippe Daverio
- Tiziano Fratus
- Wlodek Goldkorn
- Paolo Hendel
- Dacia Maraini
- Rita Marcotulli
- Paolo Migone
- Luigi Nacci
- David Riondino
- Federico Maria Sardelli
- Beppe Severgnini
- Sergio Staino
- Elena Torre
- Giorgio Van Straten
- Marco Vichi
- Sergey Yastrzhembsky
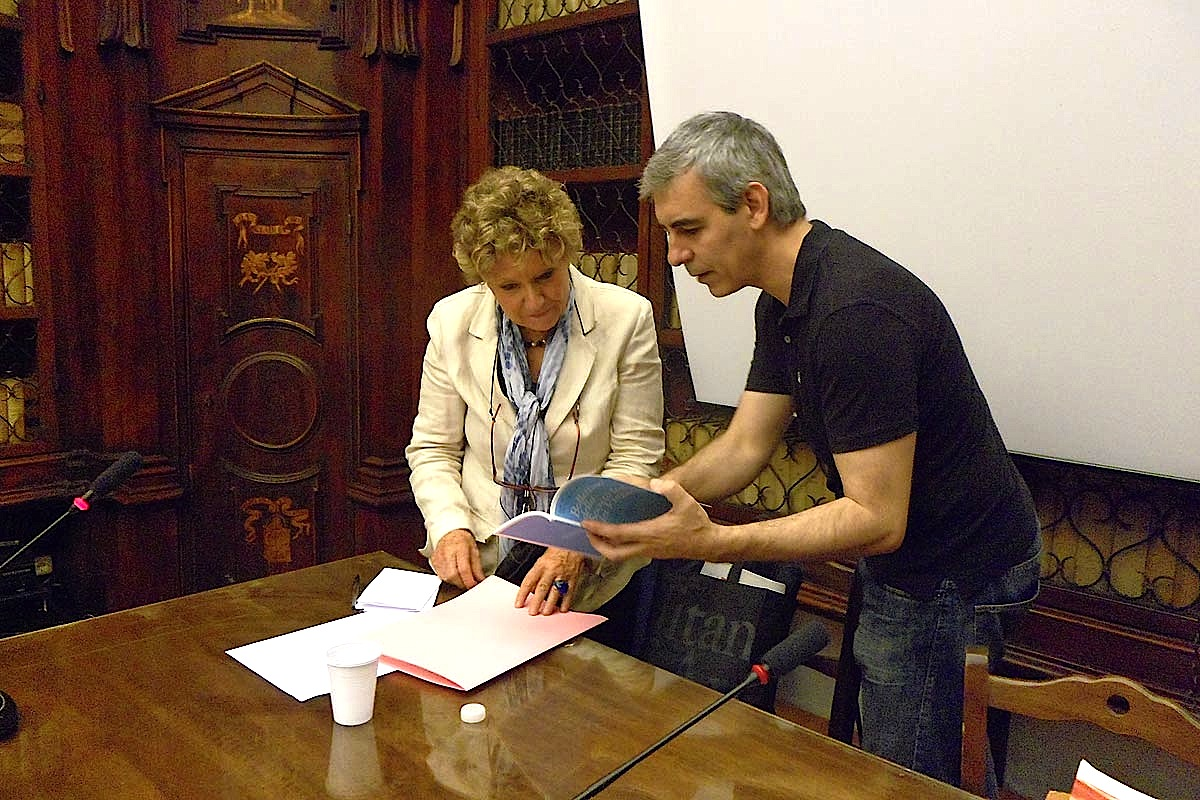
Dacia Maraini at Festival del Viaggio 2013 in Viareggio

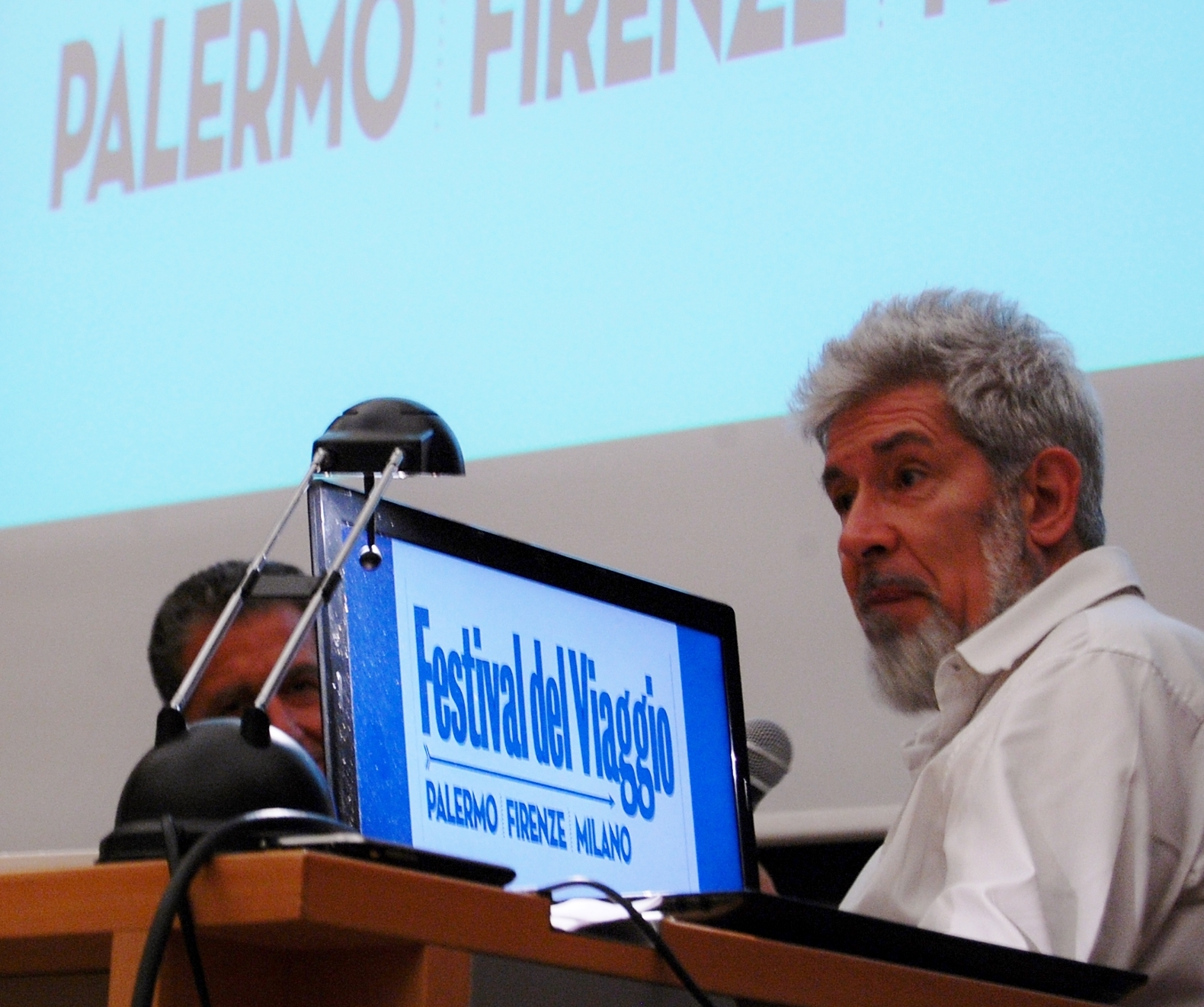
Alessandro Benvenuti at Festival del Viaggio 2013 in Florence

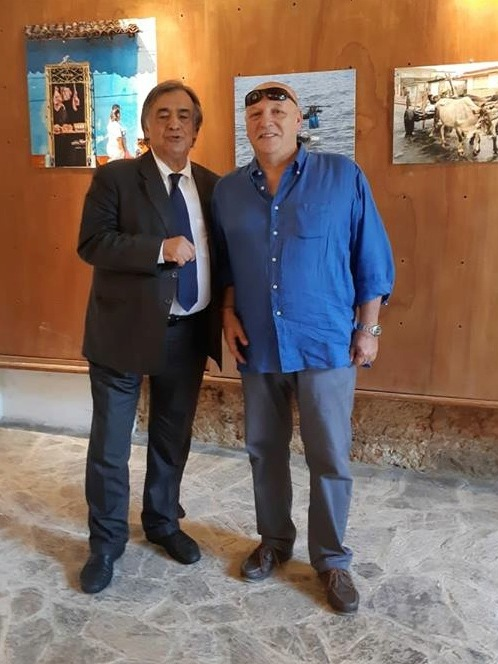
The Mayor of Palermo, Leoluca Orlando at Festival del Viaggio 2018 in Villa Niscemi, Palermo
