= Temple of Diana Umbronensis =

Archaeological site in Tuscany, Italy

- Tempio di Diana Umbronensis (Italian)
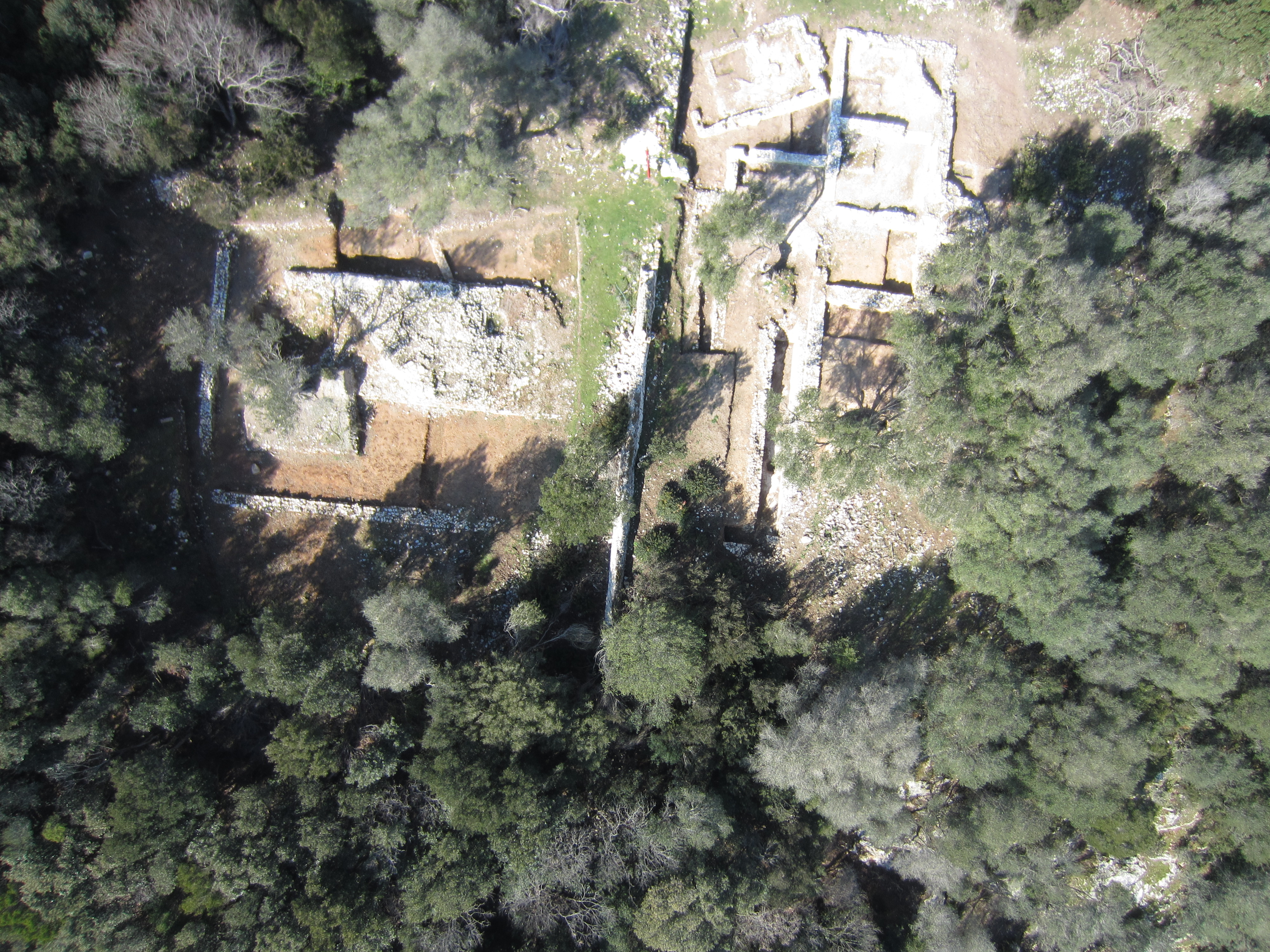
- Archaeological remains of the coastal sanctuary at Lo Scoglietto.

- Shown within coastal Tuscany
- Interactive map of Temple of Diana Umbronensis
- 42°40′23″N 11°03′04″E
- Location: Alberese, Grosseto, Tuscany, Italy

History
- Built: c. 2nd century BCE (Original foundation) c. 2nd century CE (Severan reconstruction)

Site notes
- Area: Maremma Regional Park (Lo Scoglietto)

The temple of Diana Umbronensis is an archaeological site located in the Maremma Regional Park near Alberese, in Tuscany, Italy. The site first appeared in the archaeological record in 2005, when two park rangers discovered a marble inscription commemorating Diana Umbronensis. The epithet Umbronensis most likely refers to the Ombrone river. Despite this initial discovery, excavation at the site did not begin until 2009 and was not completed until 2011. This initial excavation was conducted as part of the Alberese Archaeological Project and administered by the Soprintendenza Archeologia Toscana with the assistance of the Associazione Culturale Alberese. These studies unearthed the existence of an ancient Roman temple that was dedicated to Diana Umbronensis. The choice of temple location may owe its origin, at least in part, to the regional fauna. Boars and deer—both animals associated with Diana—are commonplace in the surrounding area, which may have motivated the construction of a temple to the hunter goddess. Furthermore, the temple is situated atop a hill that was—at the time the site was constructed—probably located directly by the sea, although the modern shoreline has changed significantly. The coastal position of the site and the consequent proximity to maritime trade, combined with is location on the border of the ager Cosanus, may have contributed to the prosperity of the temple.

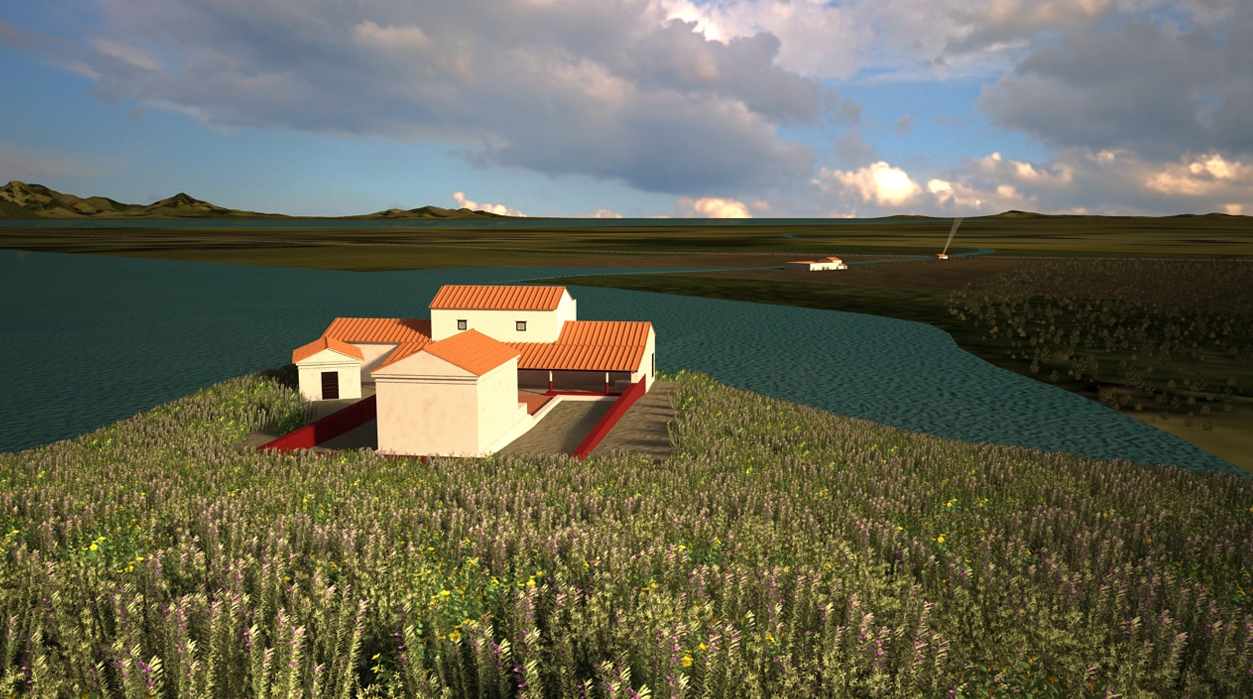
Digital reconstruction of the sanctuary

It is possible that the site was occupied by an entirely different structure prior to the creation of the temple, as an early to mid-Republican shrine was uncovered with a separate orientation plan, indicating that it operated as a distinct entity before the temple was established. This shrine continued to exist following the construction of the temple, although it was likely repurposed as a thesaurus by the Imperial era. If this theory is accepted, then it may indicate that worship of Diana at the site predated the eventual construction of the temple between the mid-1st and the early 2nd centuries CE. Regardless, the later temple was surrounded by a temenos and contained various rooms, including a fountain and a cistern. Additional chambers were built during the reign of Emperor Domitian utilizing opus mixtum ("mixed work"), an ancient Roman construction technique. The bricks utilized in this construction effort were stamped with the name of a Roman kiln owner and businessman named Titus Claudius Gobathus. At a later date, during the Severan dynasty, the area was partially deserted, and the building materials of the newly abandoned structures were reused in the main temple. Large quantities of votive oil lamps have been uncovered at the site, most of which are typologically identifiable with North African styles of Roman pottery, although there was a small minority of locally produced wares. The African imports were typically more well-preserved than the domestic pottery, perhaps indicating that they were stored in the cella and were thus better insulated from the natural wears of time.

By the mid-4th-century, a cemetery was established by the temple, although only a single grave was retrieved from the area. At a later date, though still during the 4th-century, the statue inside the cella was shattered and the votive deposits were destroyed, resulting in disparate pieces of coins and lamps strewn throughout the site. Contemporaneously, the cistern at the temple was sealed, thereby cutting off the supply of water to the site. Moreover, the walls appear to have been intentionally demolished, as indicated by disparate fragments of masonry throughout the temple. Nevertheless, numerous votive lamps from the site are dated to around the 4th or 5th centuries CE, indicating that pagan religious practices persisted in the area after the devastation of the site. Following the initial abandonment of the site, a hut was established, which was itself later deserted by the 6th-century. There may have been occupied once more from the early 11th to the early 13th centuries, as indicated by a C14 analysis of various skeletons uncovered within the cistern.
