= Rey Alejandro Conde =

Mexican conductor

Rey Alejandro Conde Valdivia is a Mexican conductor who has conducted the Orquesta Sinfónica de Xalapa (OSX) since 1977. He is a native of Xalapa, Veracruz. His discography has over 300 recordings.

Born in the 'court of The Pearl', a no longer existent building that was locating on the street Úrsulo Galván of Xalapa's center, with graduate and master's degrees for the Faculty of Music of the Universidad Veracruzana, to which he entered from 1985 after taking particular classes with several teachers, Rey Alejandro (called this way by his father and because he was born on 6 January) took classes of violin with Stanisław Kawalla, with "the Rabbit" Jiménez, Agnieszka Maklakiewicz, and Míkhail Medvid. His degree is the number 71 sent by the institution. Also, he studied orchestral direction course in Venezuela, whereas in Mexico it he did the proper thing with Francisco Savín, Gonzalo Romeu, Enrique Bátiz and others.

On having obtained a scholarship proceeding from the Organization of American States (OEA) to complement his preparation in Venezuela, this teacher had the opportunity to observe and analyze closely one of the most complete and ambitious plans for the formation of musical young men. And he comments around that experience: "In Venezuela there are federative entities of medium importance that have from five to ten youth professional orchestras, without counted the infantile ones that can come to thirty, and all with excellent level … The teacher Jose Antonio Abreu, with the collaboration of a formidable team in which Argentine teachers tell each other, he has created a system of child and youth orchestras that has revolutionized the concept of the training and musical creativity, with hundreds of thousands of integrated young men".

With artistic as executing preparation of violin and viola, from 1995 he got out of a jam itself as one of four leaders of an orchestra whom was relying on the Camerata Juvenil at the time (today La Orquesta Sinfónica Juvenil del Estado de Veracruz), at the time that he realized arrangements that were registered in recording by the same Camerata under the conducting of the Argentinian Efraín Guigui.
