= Alessandro Trentacinque =

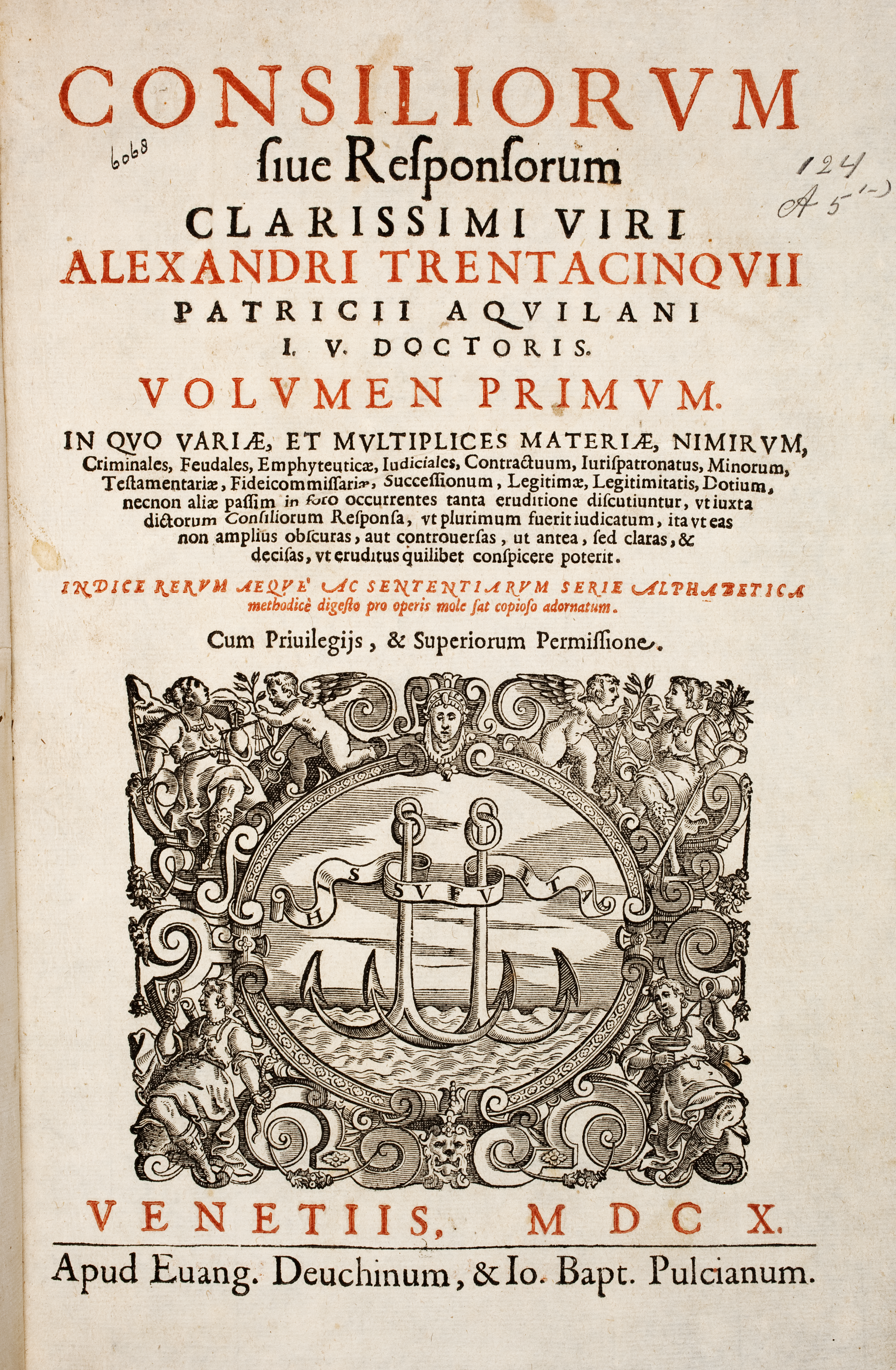
Title page of Alexander Trentacinquius: Consiliorum sive responsorum clarissimi viri, Venice, 1610

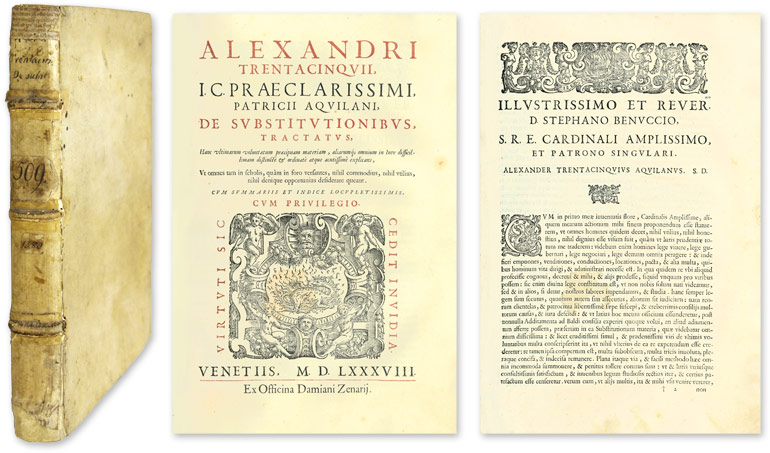
Title page and dedication of Alexander Trentacinquius: De substitutionibus, tractatus, hanc ultimarum volontatum præcipuam materiam, Venice, 1588

Alessandro Trentacinque (also known as Alessandro Trentacinque d'Aquila, Alexander Trentacinquis, and Alexander Trentacinquius, 1541–1599), was a jurist, writer and patrician from L'Aquila, Italy. The Trentacinque family was also present in Lucoli. Alessandro Trentacinque was mayor of L'Aquila around 1583, carried the noble title of Camerlengo (Chamberlain) and was buried in the Sant'Agostino church in L'Aquila.

== Publications ==
- with Damiano Zenaro and Giovanni Battista Natolini: De substitutionibus, tractatus, hanc ultimarum volontatum præcipuam materiam, aliarumque omnium in jure difficillimam distinctè & ordinatè atque acutissimè explicans, ut omnes tam in scholis, quàm in foro versantes, nihil commodius, nihil utilius, nihil denique opportunius desiderare queant. Cum summariis et indice locupletissimis., Venice, Damiano Zenaro, 1588
- Variarum resolutionum libri tres, Venice, Evangelista Deuchino and Giovanni Battista Pulciano, 1609
- Practicarum Resolutionum Juris Libri Tres: Omnes Fere Juris Vtriusque In Foro, Ac Praxi quotidie occurrentes controversias, ac quaestiones ... continentes : Cum Indice Gemino, Uno Resolutionum, Altero Rerum & Verborum memorabilium, 1610
- Consiliorum sive responsorum clarissimi viri Alexandri Trentacinquii patricii aquilani i.v. doctoris: indice rerum aeque ac sententiarum serie alphabetica methodice digesto pro operis mole sat copioso adornatum, Venice, Evangelista Deuchino and Giovanni Battista Pulciano, 1610
