= Alexandru Ioan Morțun =

Romanian politician (born 1951)

Alexandru Ioan Morțun (born July 16, 1951) is a Romanian physician, politician, and Member of the European Parliament (MEP). He is a member of the National Liberal Party (PNL), which was part of the Alliance of Liberals and Democrats for Europe until 2014, and became an MEP on January 1, 2007, with the accession of Romania to the European Union. Between 1996 and 2000, and again from 2000, he represented Mehedinți County in the Romanian Senate.

== Biography ==
Born in Drobeta-Turnu Severin, Morțun graduated from the Victor Babeș University of Medicine and Pharmacy in Timișoara (1976), specializing in Pediatrics (1982), medical ultrasonography (1996) and health care politics (2000). Between 1976 and 1979, he worked in a dispensary, was a secondary physician until 1982, and a specialist doctor at the Mehedinți County Hospital in Drobeta-Turnu Severin. From 2000 to 2004, he worked as a pediatrician, and the chief physician at the Mehedinți County House for Social Health Insurance (CJASS).

He became a member of the PNL in 1990, after the 1989 Revolution, and served as vice president of its Mehedinți County Organization after 1991, being its president between 1992 and 2005. He first became a member of the Senate after the 1996 Romanian legislative election, on Romanian Democratic Convention lists, and served as the Senate Quaestor. Morțun again won a seat during the 2004 Romanian legislative election, as a candidate of the Justice and Truth Alliance . During his first term, he sat on the Committee for Labor and Social Protection, and on the Committee for Health, Environment and Sport. After 2004, he became a member of the Committee for Investigating Abuse, Fight against Corruption and Petitions.
