= Alejandro Muñoz-Alonso =

Spanish politician (1934–2016)

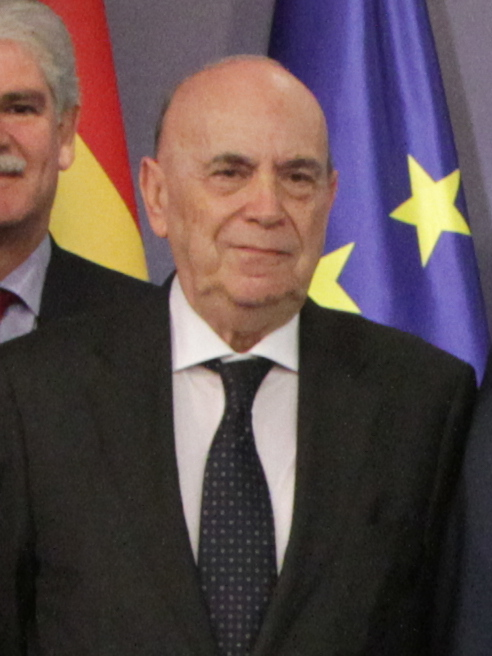

Alejandro Muñoz-Alonso (11 January 1934 – 24 January 2016) was a Spanish politician. A member of the People's Party he served in the Congress of Deputies between 1989 and 2000 and in the Senate between 2000 and 2015. From 2004 to 2006 he was appointed Vice President of the Senate.

Muñoz-Alonso was born on 11 January 1934 in Salamanca. He studied law and political sciences at the University of Salamanca and Madrid. He was a professor of Public Opinion at the Complutense University of Madrid and CEU San Pablo University. He stopped his teaching career to turn to politics. He was one of the founders of Cambio 16, the political newspaper, acting as vice president. He died on 24 January 2016 in Madrid, aged 82.

Munoz-Alonso was awarded multiple notable distinctions, the most relevant being the Order of Constitutional Merit.

== Works ==
- La aritmética de la libertad (1975)
- El terrorismo en España (1981)
- Las elecciones del cambio (1984)
- Comunicación política (1995)
- El fracaso del nacionalismo (2000)
- España en primer plano: ocho años de política exterior, 1996-2004 (2007)
