= Alejandro Cruz =

Alejandro Cruz may refer to:

- Alejandro Cruz Ortiz (1921–2007), Mexican luchador (professional wrestler) known as Black Shadow
- Alejandro Cruz (politician) (c. 1930–1993), Puerto Rican softball player and mayor of Guaynabo
- Alejandro Cruz (runner) (born 1968), Mexican marathoner
- Alejandro Jimenez Cruz (born 1972), Mexican luchador known as Dr. Cerebro
