= Alessandro Agostinelli =

Italian poet, writer, and journalist (born 1965)

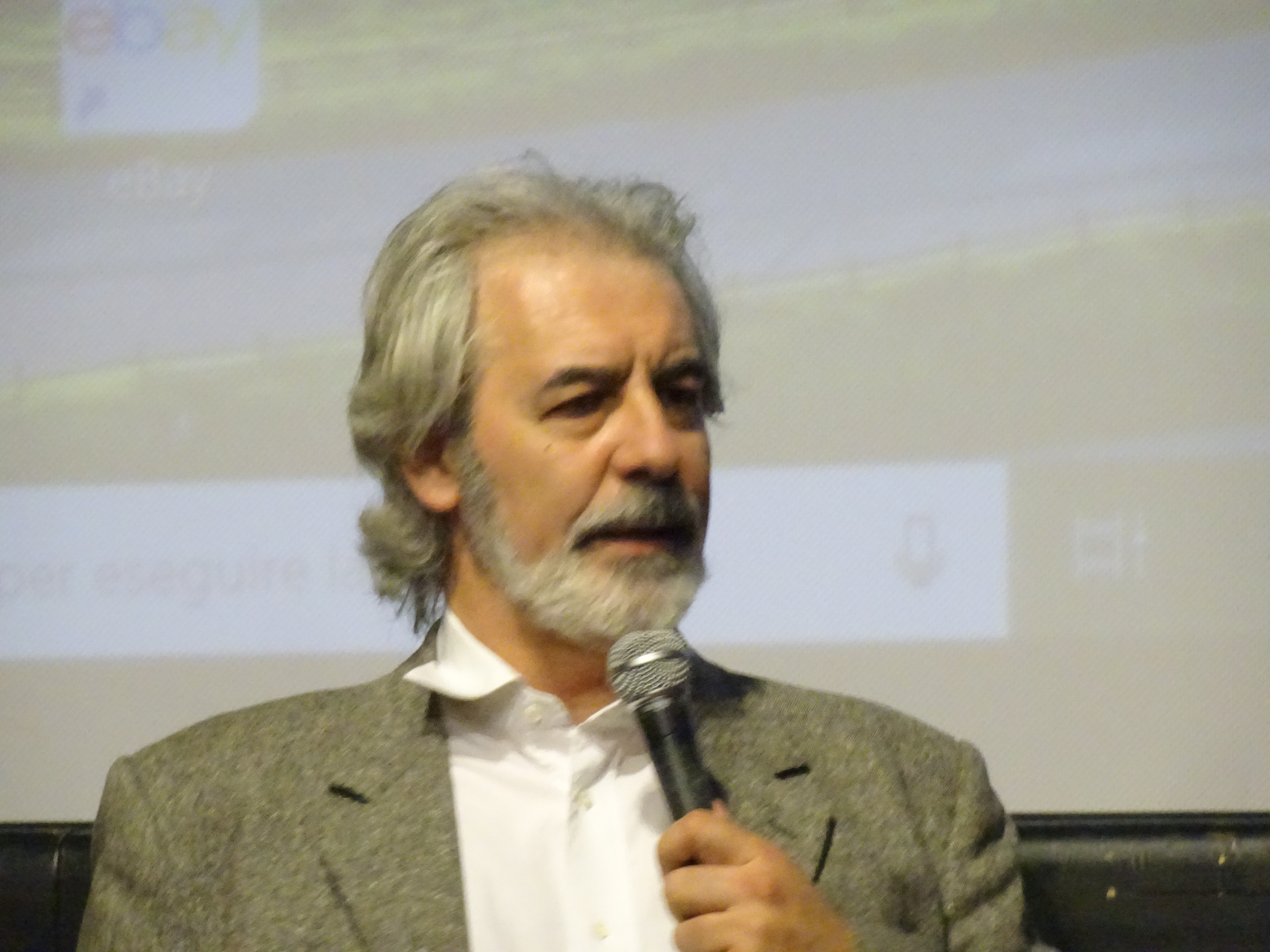
Alessandro Agostinelli in 2019

Alessandro Agostinelli (Italian pronunciation: [alesˈsandro aɡostiˈnɛlli]; born 1965) is an Italian writer, journalist and poet.

== Early life ==
Born in Follonica, he obtained a Ph.D. in "history of visual arts and show business".

== Journalism ==
He worked for Radio 24, Radio Tre Rai, Il Riformista, Il Fatto Quotidiano and L'Unità. He also worked with the magazines Polis and Zone.

=== Travel journalism ===
One of his topic of interest is the concept of "travel". He writes the travel blog Atlante for the weekly magazine L'Espresso and was of the author of the Lonely Planet's guides in Italian for Tuscany and also specifically for Florence (in 2014).

He is the president of the Società Italiana Viaggiatori and the director of the Festival del Viaggio. In 2025 the festival's twentieth anniversary was marked by a dedciated photographic catalogue retracing the event's history.

In 2011 he published Honolulu baby, a book of anecdotes and histories about the Hawaiian Islands but also about the role of writing during travel.

In 2018 he celebrated the 500th year from Leonardo da Vinci's death with a trip from Vinci to Amboise, in France.

== American culture ==
He wrote a biographical novel about Charlie Parker, Benedetti da Parker, and the essay Individualismo e Noir about U.S. cinema and specifically the economical and social roots of the noir genre and its relationship with the western one.

== Poetry ==
His poetic production dates back to the beginning of the century and is inspired by “existential and travel themes".

His poetries have been translated in Spanish, French, English and German and published in different Western counties. He has published in Spain his anthological poetry book titled En el rojo de Occidente.

In 2014 he became in charge of Poesia serie rossa, the editorial collection about poetry of the ETS publisher, one of the few new ones started in Italy at the time.

In 2019 he wrote the preface to the anthology Dix poètes italiens contemporains published in France by Le bousquet-la barthe.

== Works ==
=== Poetry ===
- Numeri e Parole, 1997, Campanotto
- Agosto e Temporali, 2000, ETS
- Il Cristo dei poeti, 2010, ETS
- En el rojo de Ocidente, 2014, Olifante, ISBN 978-84-92942-59-6
- L’ospite perfetta., 2020, Samuele Editore
- Il materiale fragile, 2021, Pequod.
- Le Vive Stagioni, 2023, Editirice l'Arcolaio.

=== Novels ===
- La vita secca, 2002, Besa, ISBN 9788849701227
- Alessandro Agostinelli, Athos Bigongiali, Sergio Costanzo, Marco Malvaldi, Matteo Pelliti, Ugo Riccarelli, Luca Ricci, Alessandro Scarpellini, Sosteneva Tabucchi, 2013, Felici Editore, ISBN 978-88-6019-641-5
- Benedetti da Parker, 2017, Cairo Editore.
- Racconti di Viaggio

=== Essays ===
- Fosfori: 17 racconti di autori italiani contemporanei, Marco Nardi, 1992, Florence, ISBN 88-7964-004-6
- Alessandro Agostinelli, Daniele Luti, Sera di Volterra. Viaggio nei luoghi e nelle storie di una città antica, 2000, ETS, ISBN 9788846702432
- La società del giovanimento. Perché l'Occidente muore senza invecchiare, 2004, Castelvecchi, ISBN 88-7615-015-3
- Una filosofia del cinema americano - Individualismo e Noir, 2004, ETS, ISBN 88-467-0811-3
- Pisa & Livorno, istruzioni sulla guerra e sui campanili, 2006, Zona
- Alessandro Agostinelli, Tito Barbini, Paolo Ciampi, Parole in viaggio. Piccola guida di scrittura per viaggiatori veri e immaginari, 2014, Romano Editore, ISBN 978-88-98629-08-4
- Un mondo perfetto. Gli otto comandamenti dei fratelli Coen, 2010, Editrice Besa Controluce, ISBN 978-88-6280-012-9
- David Lynch e il Grande Fratello, 2011, Besa, ISBN 978-88-497-0725-0
- Bernard Vanel (translator), Alessandro Agostinelli (preface), Dix poètes italiens contemporains. Dieci poeti italiani contemporanei, 2018, lebousquet-la barthe, ISBN 979-10-96573-07-3

=== Travel guides and travel literature ===
- Honolulu baby. Avventure hawaiane di musica, surf, vulcani e chiari di luna, 2011, Vallecchi, ISBN 978-88-8427-222-5
- Firenze, 2014, EDT, ISBN 978-88-5920-558-6
- Da Vinci su tre ruote. In scooter alla scoperta del genio, 2019, Exòrma.
- Giordania stilografica, 2023, Edizioni ETS, ISBN 978-8846764751
