= Alexandre Knoploch =

Brazilian politician (born 1986)

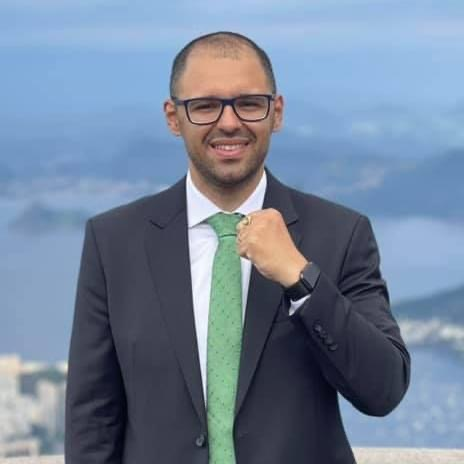
- Knoploch in 2021

Member of the Legislative Assembly of Rio de Janeiro
- Incumbent
- Assumed office 1 January 2025
- Preceded by: Léo Vieira
- In office 1 February 2019 – 31 January 2023

Personal details
- Born: 23 July 1986 (age 40)
- Party: Liberal Party (since 2024)

Alexandre Gomes Knoploch dos Santos (born 23 July 1986) is a Brazilian politician. He has been a member of the Legislative Assembly of Rio de Janeiro since 2025, having previously served from 2019 to 2023. He is the deputy group leader of the Liberal Party.
