= Alexandru A. Suțu =

Romanian businessman (1837 - 1919)

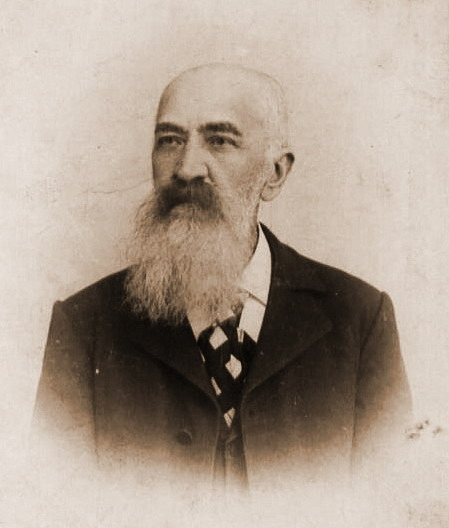
Alexandru A. Suțu

Alexandru A. Suțu (November 30, 1837–September 1919) was a Wallachian-born Romanian psychiatrist.

== Biography ==
=== Origins and activity at Mărcuța ===
He was born in Bucharest into the aristocratic Soutzos family; his father Alexandru Sutzu was high vornic and cămăraș (official in charge of the royal court's pantry). His grandfather George Sutzu was high dragoman; George's brother was Prince Alexandros Soutzos. Suțu began school in his native country before entering the University of Athens, where he studied from 1856 to 1862 and obtained a doctorate in 1863. Unhappy with the education he received, he went to the medical faculty of the University of Paris, where he obtained a second doctorate in 1865, dealing with dyspepsia. He then returned home and began his activity as a physician. In early 1866, he was named secondary physician at Mărcuța Hospital in Bucharest, rising to chief physician in the summer of 1867 and thereafter director, remaining there until retiring.

At Mărcuța, he established a new type of specialized, clinical practice; he and his colleagues and disciples drew on a wide range of French, English and German models of psychological medicine, such as: Philippe Pinel and Jean-Étienne Dominique Esquirol's paradigm of mental alienation; John Conolly's doctrine of non-restraint; Jean-Pierre Falret's theory of the clinic; Bénédict Morel and Valentin Magnan's ideas on hereditary degeneracy; Charles Darwin's theory of evolution; and Wilhelm Griesinger's principle of the organic nature of mental illness.

Believing that mental patients should be put to work, Suțu added new workshops and wrote the first theoretical papers on work and occupation in psychiatry. He classified four major types of care for the insane: the lunatic asylum; the cottage system proposed by British authors; villages or colonies for the insane, such as that found in Geel, Belgium; and agricultural farms inside or near asylums. He considered only the last model appropriate for Mărcuța and for Romania as a whole. This conclusion stemmed in part from the overcrowding at Mărcuța; the open-door system might mitigate the practical problems he encountered. He viewed patients' work not only in moral and medical terms, but also economic: patients could actively contribute to reducing the costs of their care by performing agricultural labor. He also claimed therapeutic benefits to labor, and suggested that farm supervisors would not exploit patients because medical staff, especially the chief physician, would wield great power on the farm. As to what would now be called occupational therapy, Suțu was also enthusiastic about music, but the modest financial situation of Mărcuța prevented the development of music therapy there. Overall, his objective at Mărcuța was to transform it from a place of isolation and detention into a modern medical institution that would cure patients and return them to society.

=== Other endeavors ===
In 1867, he founded and edited Romania's third medical journal, Gazetta Spitalelor. Together with three colleagues, he published Gazetta Medico-Chirurgicală a Spitalelor from 1870 to 1879. Most of his articles appeared in the latter publication, and are characterized by intellectualism and an elegant style. In 1874, Suțu published an article in which he established a direct relationship between heredity and the degeneration of nations; his ideas were a precursor of eugenics. In 1877, he published Alienatul în fața societății și a științei, the first Romanian treatise on psychiatry and on forensic psychiatry. Revista de medicină legală și psichiatrie (1884) was the country's first magazine dedicated to forensic medicine.

Widely considered the founder of Romanian psychiatry, in 1867-1868 he held Romania's first course on pathological and clinical psychiatry; classes were held every Sunday at Mărcuța for students from the University of Bucharest's medical faculty. In 1879, he was named professor at the university, where he taught mental pathology and forensics. In 1897, he became chairman of the country's first psychiatry department.

In 1877, he established and became director of Institutul Caritatea in Bucharest; this was a small, private asylum. The main difference with Mărcuța was that while the latter catered mainly to the lower classes, particularly the rural poor, Caritatea was mainly, albeit not exclusively, meant for the wealthy, cultivated sector, probably including famous people. Among these was Mihai Eminescu; first confined at Mărcuța, he was transferred by Suțu to Caritatea, where he died. Under Suțu's guidance, psychiatry in Romania became a specialty appreciated for the important benefits it could provide society. He trained assistants to diagnose dangerous mentally ill patients based on their antisocial reactions, confining them in asylums and providing them with humane care. Between 1885 and 1890, he insisted on the need for new mental hospitals. Due to his efforts, a law was adopted in 1892 providing for a new hospital in Moldavia and one in Wallachia (the latter at Bucharest). He retired in 1909, and was succeeded by his follower Alexandru Obregia. He died in Bucharest a decade later, and was buried at Bellu cemetery.

Suțu was elected a corresponding member of the Romanian Academy in 1888.
