= Alexandru Gheorghiaș =

Romanian sports commentator (died 2025)

Alexandru Gheorghiaș (died 23 July 2025) was a Romanian sports commentator.

== Life and career ==
Gheorghias began his career in radio, working with Eurosport in Romania, becoming one of the first Romanians to join the network. Following his tenure at Eurosport, he was involved in the translation and adaptations of books and subtitles of films and television programs.

== Death ==
Gheorghiaș died on 23 July 2025.
