= Alexandru Marin =

Alexandru Marin may refer to:

- Alexandru Marin (physicist)
- Alexandru Marin (boxer)
- Alexandru Marin (rugby union)
