= Philippe A. Autexier =

French music historian (1954–1998)

- Born: Philippe Alexandre Autexier; 1954; Châtellerault, France
- Died: 1998 (aged 43–44); Poitiers, France
- Occupation: Music historian

Philippe Alexandre Autexier (1954–1998) was a French music historian, musicologist, journalist and Masonic researcher, whose research on Wolfgang Amadeus Mozart and other Masonic composers is particularly significant.

== Biography ==
Autexier's passion for music led him to become a musicologist and music historian. He spoke French, English, German and Italian. He taught at several conservatories and universities in France, Italy, Germany, United Kingdom and the United States. He wrote music reviews for various specialised journals, and a number of books on Mozart, Liszt, Bartók and other Freemason musicians. He was director of the “Mozart et franc maçon” (Mozart and Freemason) exhibition in 1991 in Cahors. He also participated in many radio programmes, such as France Musique, France Culture, BBC Radio, as well as German and Swiss channels.

During more than 20 years, he worked on the subject of “Colonne d’Harmonie” (Column of Harmony)—a research on the history of Masonic music—which led him to study all the collections of Masonic archives in Europe (Paris, Strasbourg, Zürich, Vienna, Bayreuth, Berlin, Poznań, The Hague, et cetera). The research results were published in his book La Colonne d’Harmonie : Histoire, Théorie, Pratique.

Among Autexier's publications, the only work written for the general public is Beethoven: La force de l’absolu, a richly illustrated pocket book belonging to the “Découvertes Gallimard” collection, which has been translated into seven languages, including English. It is simple, concise and accessible to all, unlike the rest of his books which are specialist works.

== Bibliography ==
- Béla Bartók : Musique de la vie, Stock Musique, 1981
- Les oeuvres témoins de Mozart, Éditions A. Leduc, 1982
- Mozart & Liszt sub Rosa, Centre Mozart, 1984
- Mozart, Honoré Champion, 1987
- Don Giovanni : Horizons mozartiens, Philippe Olivier, 1990
- Beethoven : La force de l’absolu, collection « Découvertes Gallimard » (nº 106), série Arts. Éditions Gallimard, 1991, new edition in 2010
  - Beethoven: The Composer as Hero, “Abrams Discoveries” series. Harry N. Abrams, 1992. (U.S. edition)
  - Beethoven: The Composer as Hero, ‘New Horizons’ series, Thames & Hudson, 1992. (UK edition)
- La Lyre Maçonne : Mozart, Haydn, Spohr, Liszt, Éditions Detrad aVs, 1991
- La Colonne d’Harmonie : Histoire, Théorie, Pratique, Éditions Detrad aVs, 1991, new edition in 2013
- L’art de la planche : Théorie et pratique du morceau d’architecture et de la communication en loge, Éditions Detrad aVs, 1996, new edition in 2005
