= Alejandro Pacheco =

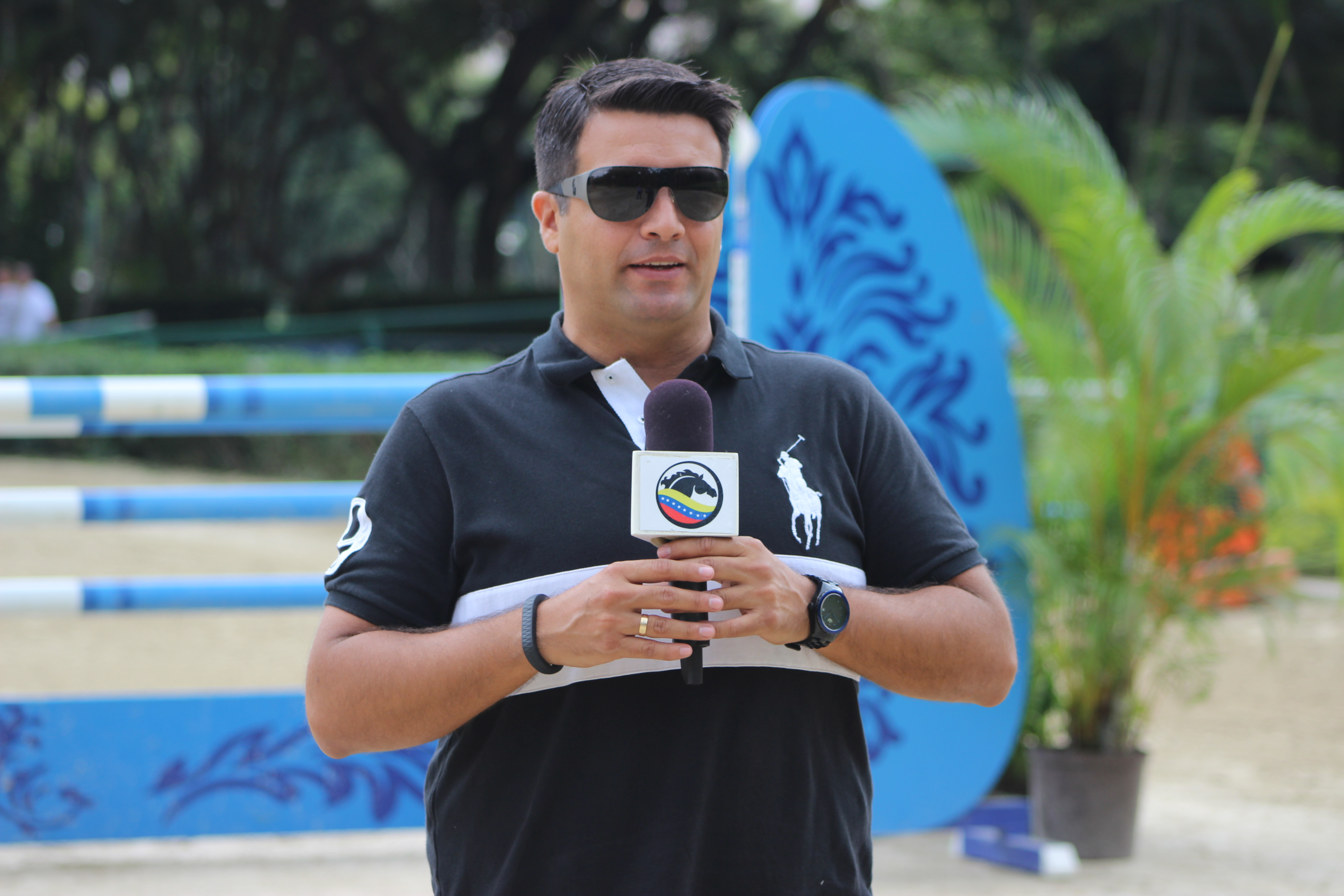
- Born: September 5, 1972 (age 53); Valencia, Venezuela
- Occupations: Speaker, Commentator & Sports TV Producer
- Spouse: Jenny Puchi
- Children: Sophia and Sebastian
- Website: Tu Mundo Ecuestre

Alejandro Pacheco (born September 5, 1972) is a Venezuelan sports commentator, broadcaster, and television producer. He is known for his work in sports media, including as the creator and host of Binomio Venezuela, an equestrian show jumping program broadcast on Meridiano Televisión.

== Early career ==
Alejandro Pacheco trained as a civil engineer before transitioning into sports media. He began his broadcasting career in 1999 at Radio Deporte 1590AM under the mentorship of Venezuelan sports journalist Herman "Chiquitin" Ettedgui.

During this period, Pacheco focused on covering Major League Baseball (MLB), the National Basketball Association (NBA), and other international sports. He was involved in producing daily updates on Venezuelan athletes competing across multiple leagues, including the Minor League Baseball, independent leagues, the Mexican League and Japanese professional baseball.

He remained at Radio Deporte for four years, collaborating with commentators such as Duilio Di Giacomo, Reyes Alamo, Ramón Corro, Tony Cruz, Rene Rincon, and Herman Ettedgui.

== Television career ==
Pacheco began working in television in 2000 and joined Meridiano Television in November 2003.

He co-hosted the live sports magazine program La Voz del Fanatico alongside Ramón Corro, a weekday show that aired until 2011. During this period, he also participated in the coverage of major sporting events, including the Venezuelan Professional Basketball League (LPB), National Basketball Association (NBA), Venezuelan Professional Baseball League (LVBP), Major League Baseball (MLB), the Caribbean Series and World Baseball Classic.

He later contributed to broadcasts of international multi-sport events such as the Olympic Games, Central American and Caribbean Games, South American Basketball Championship, and Bolivarian Games.

In 2011, Pacheco launched Binomio Venezuela, an equestrian show jumping program on Meridiano Television, where he served as both producer and host. The program focuses on national and international competitions and has covered events across North America, South America, and Europe, including the FEI World Equestrian Games (Normandy 2014 and Tryon 2018), the American and South American Championships, Bolivarian Games, and Central American and Caribbean Games.

He has also conducted interviews with international show jumping riders, including Doda de Miranda and Daniel Bluman.

== Other media ==
In addition to his television work, Pacheco founded several equestrian media platforms, including binomiovenezuela.com (2011), tumundoecuestre.com (2013) and bestjumpingmedia.com (2014).

Among these, Tu Mundo Ecuestre is a digital platform focused on international show jumping coverage, including coverage of FEI rankings and international competitions.

The platform publishes content in Spanish and English and covers events across multiple regions.
