= Alexandros =

Alexandros may refer to:

- Alexandros, a Greek name, the origin for the English name Alexander
- Alexandros (band), a Japanese rock band
- Alexandros (play), a tragedy by the Athenian playwright Euripides
- Alexandros, Greece, a village on the island of Lefkada

== See also ==
- Alexander (disambiguation)
- Alexandro
