= Uccellina Mountains =

- Uccellina Hills
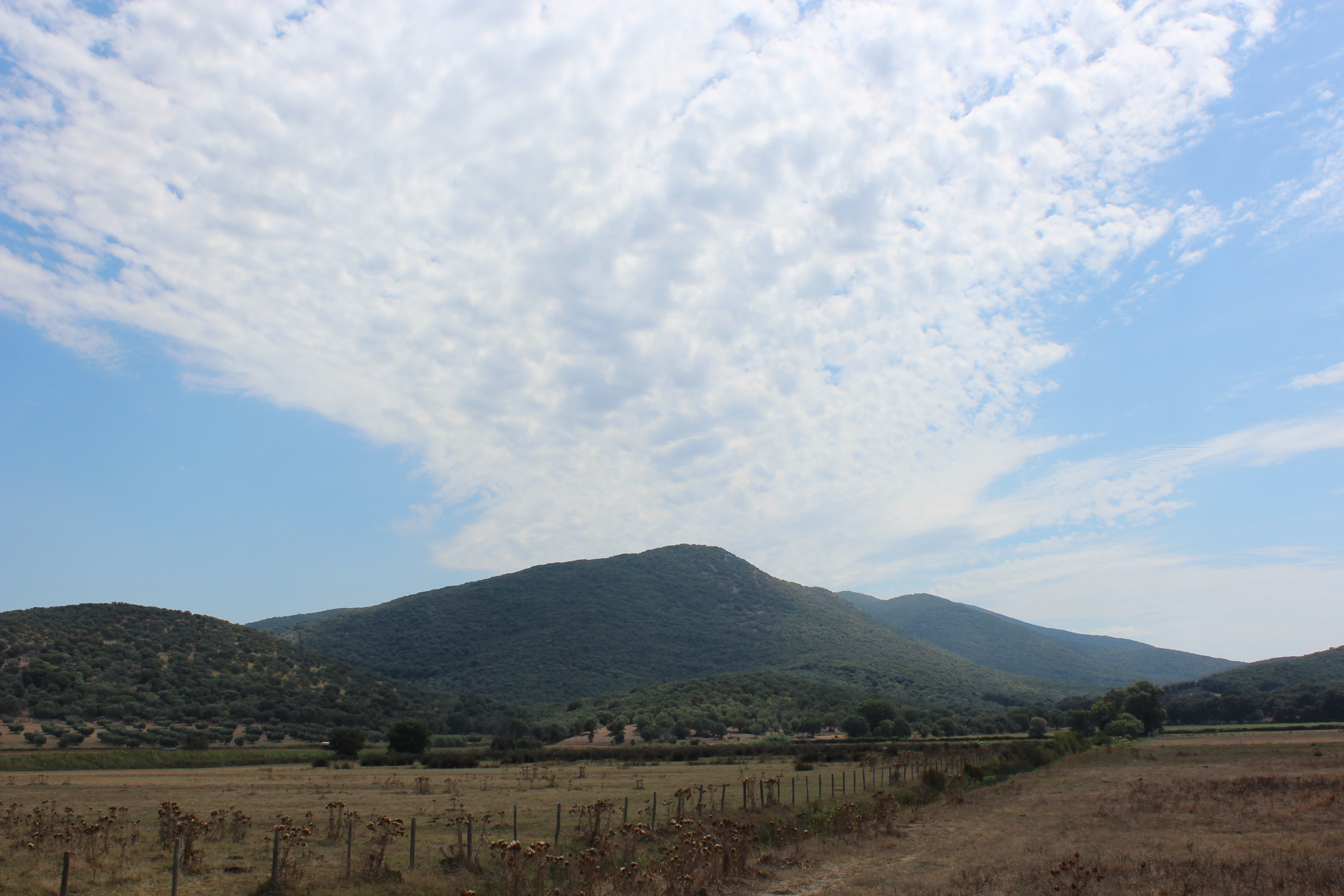

Highest point
- Peak: Poggio Lecci
- Elevation: 417 m (1,368 ft)
- Coordinates: 42°38′19″N 11°05′29″E

Geography
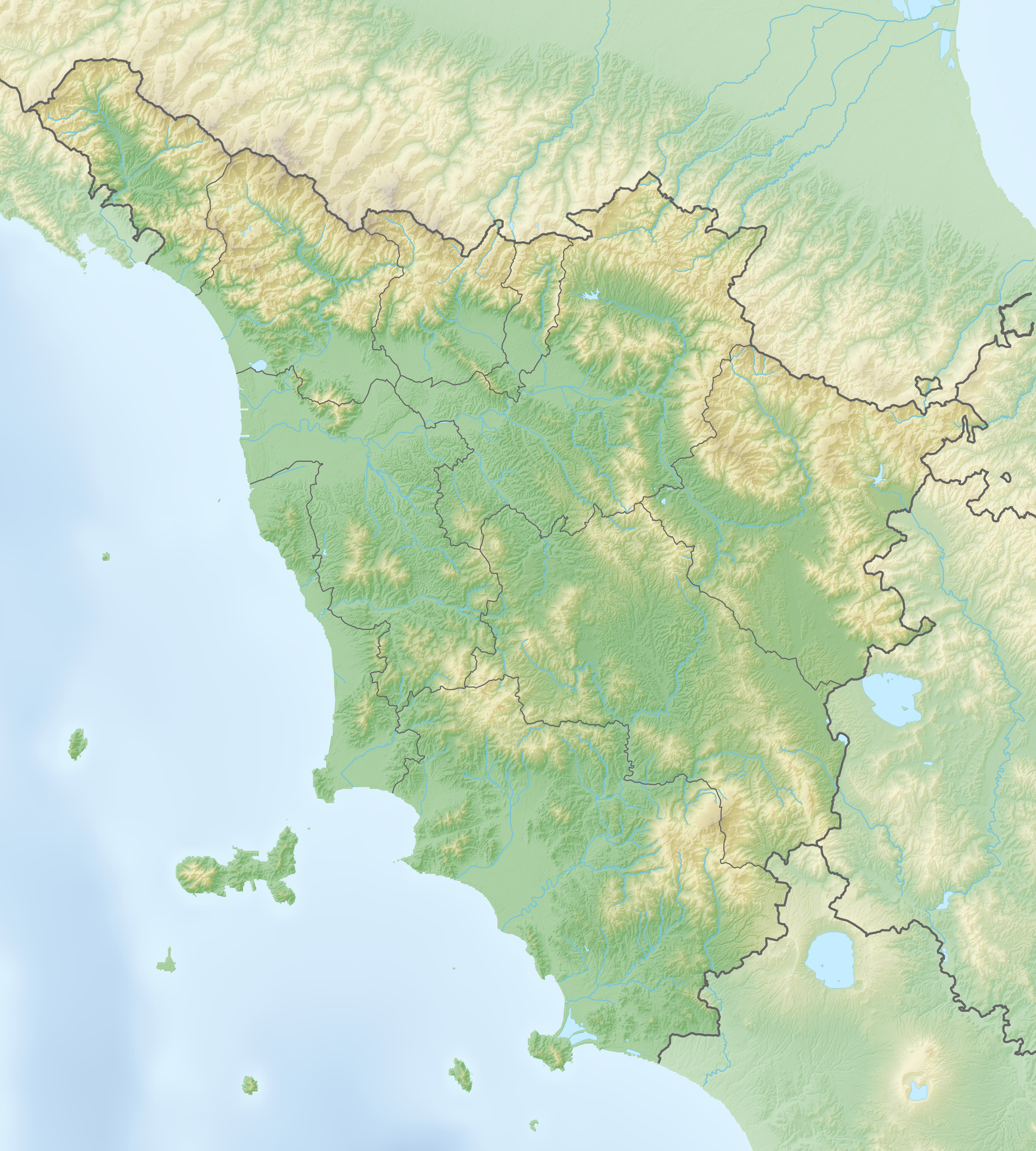
- Location within Tuscany
- Country: Italy
- Region: Tuscany

The Uccellina Mountains (Italian: Monti dell'Uccellina) are a group of hills located in the Maremma Regional Park, province of Grosseto, Tuscany, Italy.These mountains divide the Ombrone plain in the north from the Albegna plain in the south.

The territory is included into the municipalities of Grosseto, Magliano in Toscana and Orbetello.

The Uccellina mountains are home to many wild animals such as wild boars, deer, fallow deer, red foxes, porcupines, turtles(Caretta caretta, Testudo hermanni and Emys orbicularis), and many species of rare Italian birds. The flora are composed of numerous species, including endemics.

== Sources ==
- "Uccellina Mountains". Treccani.
