= Alessandro (disambiguation) =

Alessandro is both a masculine Italian given name and a surname.

Alessandro may also refer to:

- Alessandro (opera), a 1726 opera by Handel
- Alessandro, California, US

== People ==
- Alessandro, Signor of Ottajano (1560–1606), Italian patrician
- Alessandro, Marquis de Maffei (1662–1730), Italian military officer
- Alessandro, 1st Duke of Castel Duino (1881–1937)
- Alessandro (footballer, born 1977), Alessandro da Conceição Pinto, Brazilian right-back
- Alessandro (footballer, born March 1982), Alessandro Nunes, Brazilian football striker
- Alessandro (footballer, born August 1982), Alessandro Viana da Silva, Brazilian left-back
- Alessandro (footballer, born 1983) (1983–2005), Alessandro Pinheiro Martins, Brazilian defensive midfielder
- Alessandro (footballer, born 1988), Alessandro Felipe Oltramari, Brazilian goalkeeper
