= Maremma Regional Park =

Protected area in Tuscany, Italy

- Parco Regionale della Maremma
- IUCN category IV (habitat/species management area)
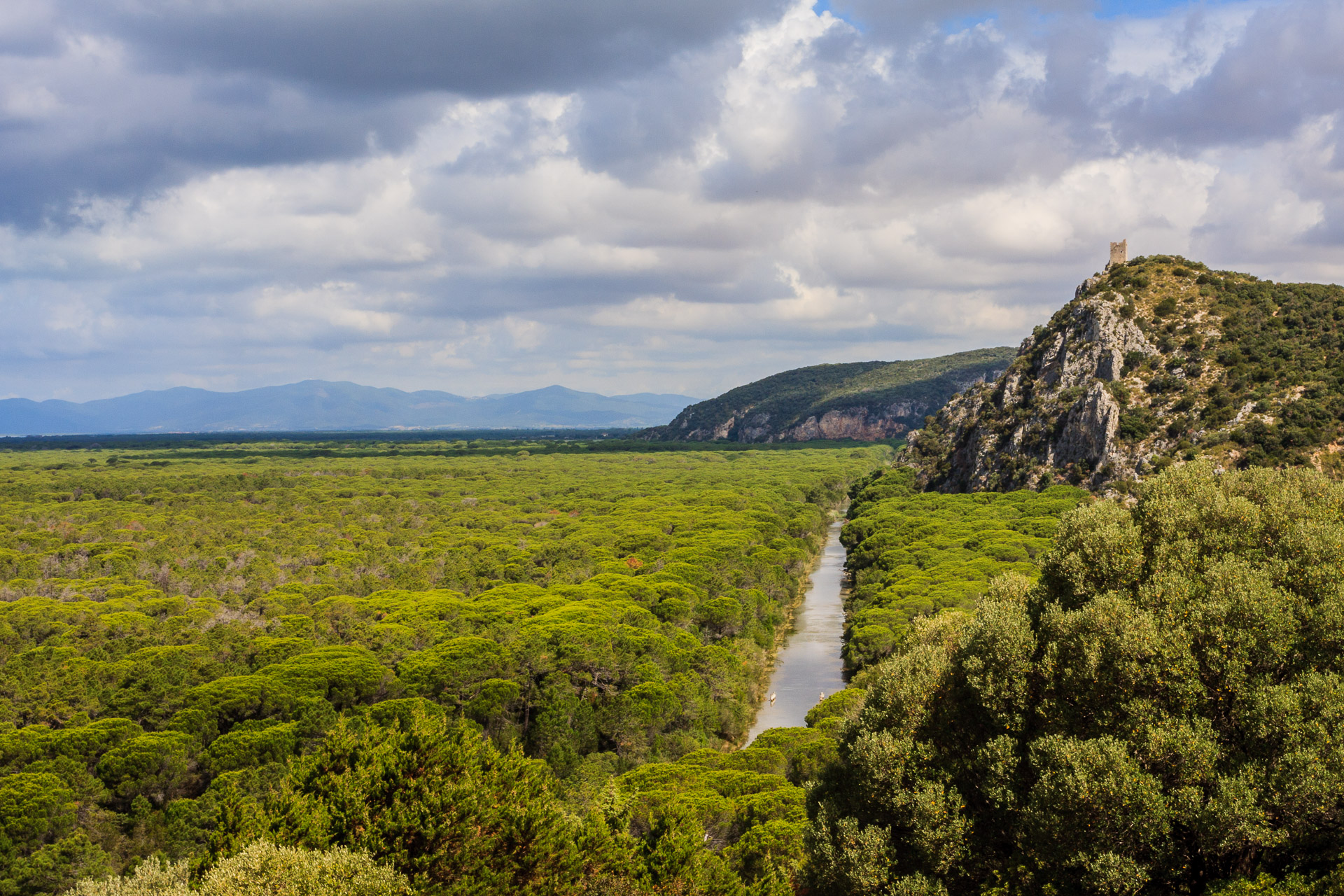

- Location within Italy
- Location: Grosseto Province, Italy
- Nearest city: Grosseto
- Coordinates: 42°37′59″N 11°05′31″E
- Area: 9,000 ha (22,000 acres)
- Established: 1975
- Website: www.parco-maremma.it/index.php/en

The Maremma Regional Park (Italian: Parco Regionale della Maremma), also known as Uccellina Park (Parco dell'Uccellina), covers a coastal area between Principina a Mare and Talamone in the province of Grosseto, right up to the Livorno-Roma train line. The park covers 9,000 hectares (22,000 acres) plus an extra 8,500 hectares (21,000 acres) of open land around its boundaries, and it is included in the municipalities of Grosseto, Magliano in Toscana and Orbetello.

The Park is characterized by important geographical elements such as the last stretch of the river Ombrone, the orographic system of the Uccellina Mountains which reaches 417 metres (1,368 ft) of height in Poggio Lecci, the marsh area of Trappola, and the coast which is both sandy and characterized by steep cliffs.

== Sources ==
- Bardi, Gulio (2021). Oltre l'ambiente. Etnografia intorno al Parco Regionale della Maremma, fra tutela e patrimonio. Pisa: Pacini.
- Bardi, Giulio; Santini, Federico; Pastorelli, Alberto, eds. (2025). Il Parco della Maremma. Mezzo secolo di tutela / The Maremma Park. Half a Century of Protection. Florence: Giunti.
- Guerrini, Giuseppe (1981). Il Parco della Maremma. Florence: Tellini.
