= Principina =

Principina may refer to a pair of Italian villages in Tuscany, frazioni of Grosseto:

- Principina a Mare, by the sea
- Principina Terra, between the coast and Grosseto
