= Fort Le Marze =

Coastal fortification in Tuscany, Italy

Coordinates: 42.7521°N 10.9168°E

- Grosseto, Tuscany, Italy
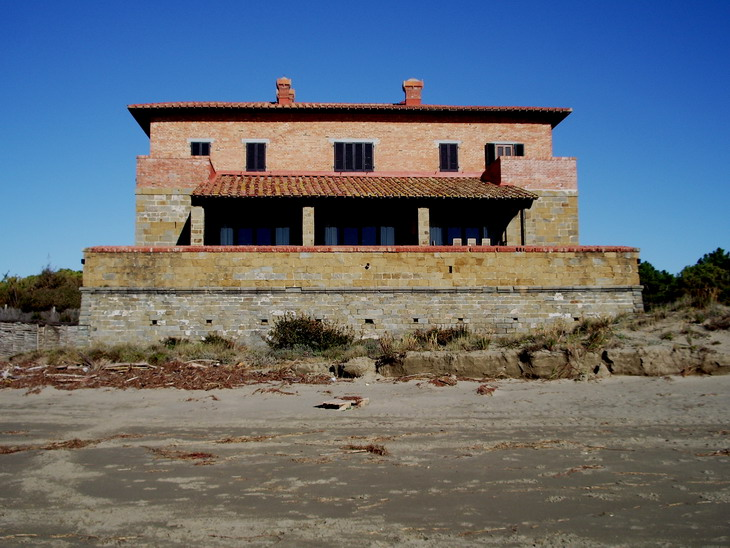

Site information
- Type: Coastal fort
- Owner: Private
- Open to the public: No
- Condition: Converted into holiday residence

Site history
- Built: 1786–1793
- Built by: Peter Leopold of Tuscany
- Materials: Stone and brick

Fort Le Marze is a coastal fortification located in the municipality of Grosseto, Tuscany, Italy, along the shoreline between Marina di Grosseto and Castiglione della Pescaia.

Built in the second half of the 18th century as part of a wider coastal defence system commissioned by Grand Duke Peter Leopold, it was intended to protect the Tuscan coast from piracy, smuggling, and public health threats. Originally a military structure, the fort has undergone extensive 20th-century alterations and today appears as a seaside villa, with only parts of its original quadrangular defensive layout still visible.

== History ==
The fort was commissioned by Grand Duke Peter Leopold of Tuscany in the second half of the 18th century as part of a broader coastal defence programme aimed at protecting the Tuscan coast from pirate raids, epidemics such as the Marseille plague, and smuggling activities.

Between 1786 and 1793, six forts of similar typology were built along this coastal stretch, including Fort Le Marze and Fort San Rocco, forming a defensive system along the Tombolo area, which had previously lacked adequate fortifications. The fort was originally named "Fort Cosimo".

After the unification of Italy, many coastal forts and towers were decommissioned and converted into private residences, including Fort Le Marze. During the 20th century, the structure underwent major alterations that transformed it into a seaside villa. Coastal erosion also contributed to changing its original position, which was once directly on the shoreline.

== Description ==
The fort has a quadrangular plan, with stone-covered lower walls and brick upper levels. Following its 20th-century renovation, the building acquired architectural features more typical of a villa.

Original elements remain visible in the sloping stone defensive walls and in the central structure, which is topped by a low hipped roof with several chimneys. On the western side, a terrace enclosed by curtain walls is surmounted by a 20th-century loggia.

== Sources ==
- Mazzolai, Aldo (1997). Guida della Maremma. Percorsi tra arte e natura. Florence: Le Lettere.
- Guerrini, Giuseppe, ed. (1999). Torri e castelli della Provincia di Grosseto. Siena: Nuova Immagine.
- Parisi, Marcella, ed. (2001). Grosseto dentro e fuori porta. L'emozione e il pensiero. Siena: C&P Adver Effigi.
