= Istia d'Ombrone =

- Frazione
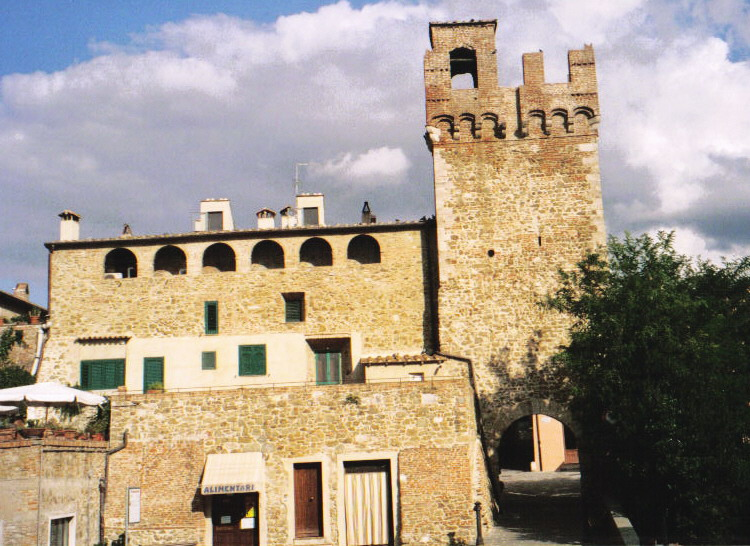
- View of Porta Grossetana

- Location of Istia d'Ombrone in Italy
- Coordinates: 42°46′57″N 11°11′19″E
- Country: Italy
- Region: Tuscany
- Province: Grosseto (GR)
- Comune: Grosseto
- Elevation: 39 m (128 ft)

Population (2010)
  - Total: 2,027
- Demonym: Istiani
- Time zone: UTC+1 (CET)
  - Summer (DST): UTC+2 (CEST)
- Postal code: 58100
- Dialing code: 0564

Istia d'Ombrone (Italian: [ˈistja domˈbroːne]) is a small town in southern Tuscany, Italy, a frazione of the comune of Grosseto.

== History ==
In the area surrounding the centre of Istia there have been found some ruins of ancient habitations dating back to the Etruscan era in the area of Poggio Cavallo. It was inhabited also during the Roman era, as testified by some construction materials reused in later periods to build the walls of Istia. In that period there was also a series of roads which crossed the area allowing communication with the Lake Prile and with the hinterland. However the centre of Istia arose as a settlement fortified along the Valley of Ombrone and from 862 was owned by the bishops of Roselle, which had feudal rights with the title of counts and so here they established a residence. Later it passed to the family of the Aldobrandeschi, becoming in 1226 a free Comune with the acceptance of the relative statute. In 1274 it was assigned to the County of Santa Fiora at the moment of the division of the goods and the territories controlled by the Aldobrandeschi family. In the Medieval period the centre became also home to a residence of bishops, after the passage of the diocese from Roselle to Grosseto.

In the course of the 14th century, it passed under the control of Siena, enduring a very serious demographic decline between 1331 and 1353, also because of the diffusion of the Yersinia pestis which occurred right at the end of that period. In the 15th century Istia had become a feud of the Piccolomini family, even though it continued to maintain the status of free Comune and having a high degree of autonomy within the Republic of Siena. After the final political fall of Siena, Istia become part of the Grand Duchy of Tuscany.

In 1783, Istia was annexed to the municipality of Grosseto.

During the Second World War, on 22 March 1944, the Maiano Lavacchio massacre took place into the nearby countryside.

== Main sights ==
The town walls, nearly completely destroyed in 1137 by Henry X, Duke of Bavaria, were rebuilt only under the Sieneses. Some ruins of the Portaccia and the Porta Grossetana, which backs to the Palzzo della Giustizia dating to the 1400, are conserved. The residence of the bishop-counts, the Palazzo di San Salvatore, was afterwards transformed into a fortification by the Sieneses. In the town there are also two churches, one within the walls and the other on the outside of the walls in front of the Porta Grossetana.

=== Military architecture ===
- Walls of Istia d'Ombrone, fortified walls of the town.
- Porta Grossetana, one of the two original doors along the ancient walls, made in medieval times, almost certainly around the 12th century .
- Cassero Senese, also known as Episcopal Palace, was built in the first half of the 13th century, as a place of temporary residence for bishops of the Diocese of Grosseto. With the passage of Istia d'Ombrone under the control of Siena, the building was transformed into a cassero.
- Porta Senese, the door in the north-east side of the walls, it was built during the 12th century with the tower in which it is incorporated.

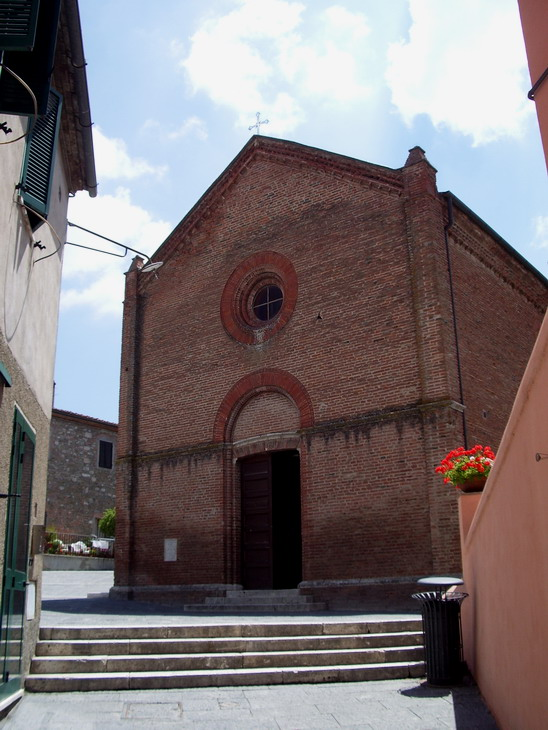
Church of San Salvatore

=== Palazzi ===
- Palazzo di Giustizia, a courthouse built in the 15th century.
- Spedale dei Battenti, a sort of hospital, built in 1321 to provide assistance. It is now used for residential purposes.

=== Churches ===
- Church of San Salvatore, dating to the 13th century, was many times restored in the centuries to come. It conserves a wooden sculpture dating to the 1400 of the Sienese School, a contemporary painting of the Madonna con bambino by Giovanni di Paolo and another painting by Vincenzo Tamagni of 1528.
- Church of San Sebastiano, once dedicated to Saint Stephan, placed in the little square outside the walls.

=== Missing architecture ===
- Oratorio di San Gherardo
- Chiesa della Santissima Annunziata
- Chiesa di San Donato

== Sources ==
- Aldo Mazzolai. Guida della Maremma. Percorsi tra arte e natura. Florence, Le Lettere, 1997.
- Giuseppe Guerrini. Torri e Castelli della provincia di Grosseto (Amministrazione Provinciale di Grosseto). Siena, Nuova Immagine Editrice, 1999.
- Carlo Citter. Guida agli edifici sacri della Maremma. Siena, Nuova Immagine Editrice, 2002.

== See also ==
- Grosseto
- Maremma
- Alberese
- Batignano
- Braccagni
- Marina di Grosseto
- Montepescali
- Principina a Mare
- Principina Terra
- Rispescia
- Roselle, Italy
