= Fort San Rocco =

Coastal fortification in Tuscany, Italy

Coordinates: 42°42′57″N 10°59′12″E

- Marina di Grosseto, Grosseto, Tuscany, Italy
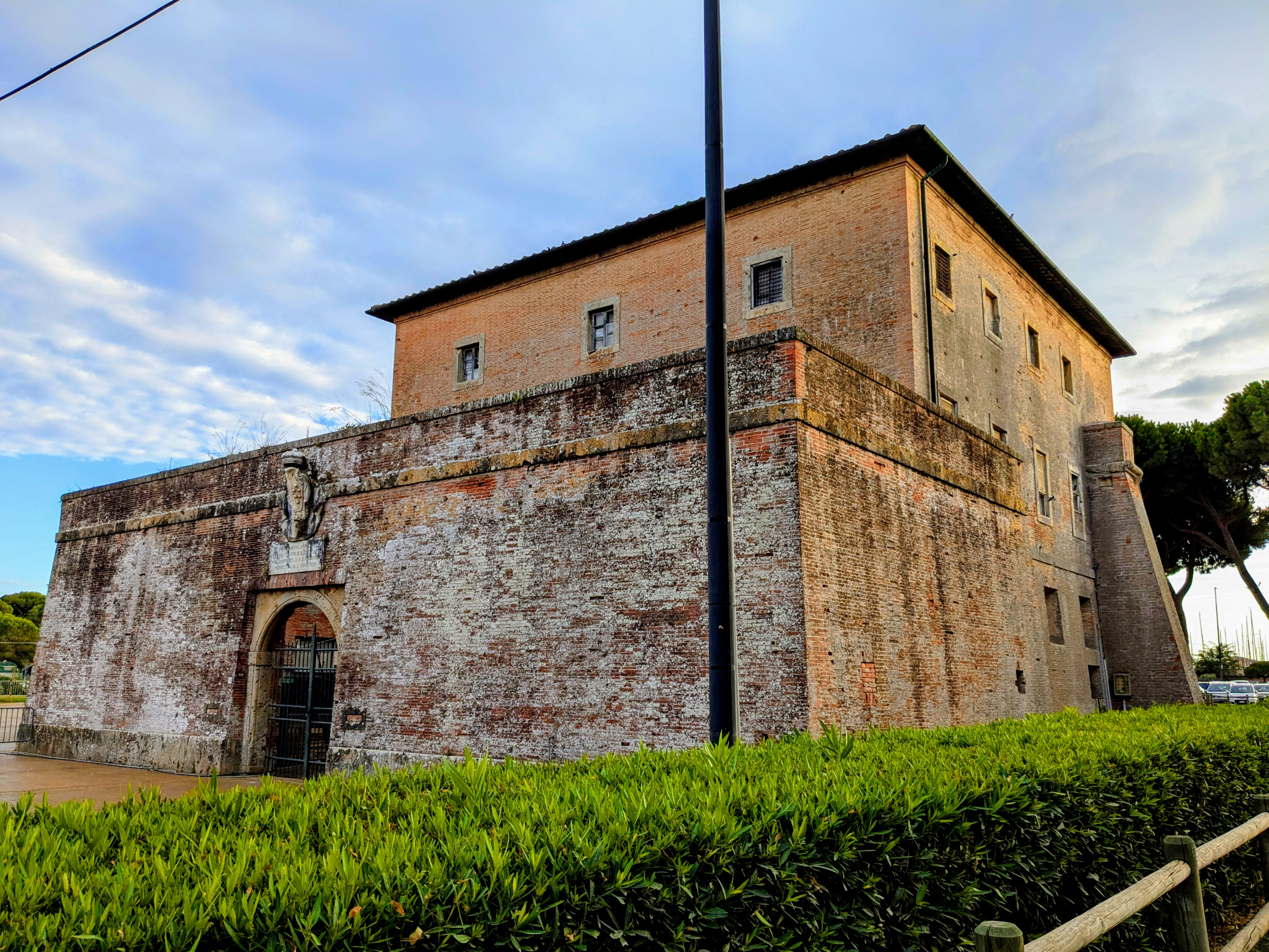

Site information
- Type: Coastal fort
- Open to the public: Limited
- Condition: Preserved; former military use

Site history
- Built: 1788–1793
- Built by: Peter Leopold
- Materials: Brick and stone

Fort San Rocco is a coastal fortification located in Marina di Grosseto, in Tuscany, central Italy. It was built between 1788 and 1793 as part of the Grand Duchy of Tuscany's coastal defence system and later served multiple military, sanitary, and administrative functions.

== History ==
The site originally hosted a small sanitary guard post established in the early 18th century, used for coastal health surveillance during epidemics such as the plague of Marseille. This early structure consisted of a simple hut with a small military detachment responsible for monitoring maritime traffic.

In the second half of the 18th century, Grand Duke Peter Leopold ordered a major strengthening of the Tuscan coastal defence system. As part of this programme, the existing post at San Rocco was replaced by a permanent fort designed by engineer Pietro Conti. Construction began in 1788 and was completed in 1793 under Ferdinand III.

The fort was integrated into a broader defensive and administrative system along the Maremma coast, which included other fortifications such as those at Bocca d'Ombrone and Le Marze. It also played a role in land reclamation and coastal management policies promoted by the Habsburg-Lorraine government.

After completion, the fort remained an active military structure, later acquiring additional civil functions. In 1838, the San Rocco Canal was excavated near the site as part of drainage works connected to the reclamation of Lake Castiglione. The canal outlet became a small commercial landing point, and in 1872 the area was used as a customs station. The fort remained in military use until 1982.

== Description ==
Fort San Rocco is composed of three main structural elements: a seaward bastion, the main fort building, and an enclosing courtyard.

The bastion faces the sea and features a sloping masonry wall with rounded corners, topped by a stone cordon. It contains a large artillery terrace designed for heavy guns. The main building is a rectangular, three-storey structure used for command and accommodation.

The courtyard side includes service buildings arranged around a large entrance gate in travertine. Inside the complex were barracks, storage rooms, a chapel, cisterns, stables, and other functional spaces supporting both military operations and daily life.

The fort was designed to house a garrison of soldiers, cavalry units, and officers, and included facilities such as artillery positions, powder magazines, and living quarters distributed across multiple levels.

== Sources ==
- Bueti, Serafina (1995). Il forte di San Rocco: una struttura militare nel sistema difensivo del litorale toscano del secolo 18. Grosseto: Archivio di Stato.
- Innocenti, Mario; Innocenti, Stefano (1999). Marina di Grosseto. Grosseto: Innocenti.
- Vellati, Elena; Fommei, Maria Serena (1996). Il nuovo forte di San Rocco. Da capanna a forte: storia di un edificio militare. Grosseto: I Portici.
- Vellati, Elena (1999). "Forte delle Marze. Forte di San Rocco". In Parisi, Marcella (ed.). Grosseto dentro e fuori porta. Siena: C&P Adver Effigi.
