= Rispescia =

- Frazione
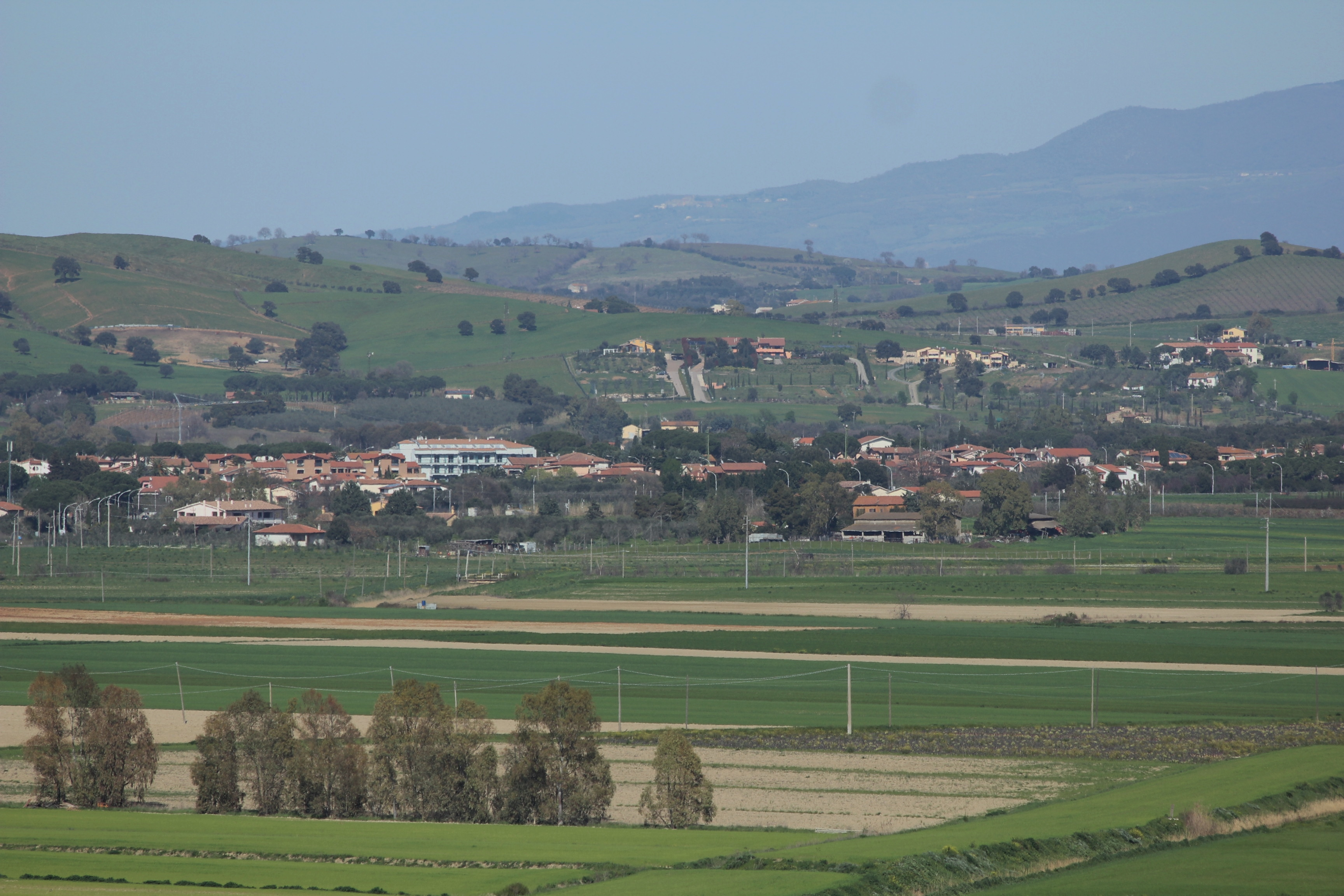
- View of Rispescia

- Location of Rispescia in Italy
- Coordinates: 42°42′26″N 11°08′05″E
- Country: Italy
- Region: Tuscany
- Province: Grosseto (GR)
- Comune: Grosseto
- Elevation: 11 m (36 ft)

Population (2010)
  - Total: 1,140
- Demonym: Rispescini
- Time zone: UTC+1 (CET)
  - Summer (DST): UTC+2 (CEST)
- Postal code: 58100
- Dialing code: 0564

Rispescia (Italian: [riˈspeʃʃa]), or Santa Maria di Rispescia, is a village (frazione) in southern Tuscany, Italy, administratively part of the municipality of Grosseto. It is located approximately 10 km south-east of Grosseto, near the entrance to the Maremma Regional Park and close to the hamlet of Alberese. The town developed primarily during the 20th century following the large-scale reclamation of the Maremma plain and the subsequent land reform.

On the eastern outskirts of the residential area is the Legambiente Environmental Education Centre, which hosts the Festambiente environmental festival annually in August.

== Geography ==
Rispescia is located in the southern part of the municipality of Grosseto, at an elevation of 11 metres above sea level. It lies beyond the Ombrone River, which borders the settlement to the north-west, and near the entrance to the Maremma Regional Park. The surrounding landscape is largely flat, reflecting the characteristics of the Maremma plain, although several hilly reliefs fall within the hamlet's territory, including Poggio Cavallo (181 m) and Poggio Campore (203 m).

The settlement is crossed by the Rispescia stream, which flows from the area north of Montiano and joins the Ombrone west of the village. To the south, the territory is delimited by the artificial Essiccatore Principale dell'Alberese canal, which separates Rispescia from the neighbouring hamlet of Alberese.

== History ==
The toponym "Rispescia" is first attested in a 1258 deed of sale referring to a rural district near Grosseto named after a stream flowing into the Ombrone River. Medieval and early modern sources from the 14th and 15th centuries document the area as part of the agricultural estates of the Grancia di Grosseto, administered by the Hospital of Santa Maria della Scala in Siena. These records also attest to the presence of cultivated land, rural properties, and a paved road ("via carraria") running south of Grosseto along the route toward Talamone.

Although documented since the Middle Ages, Rispescia remained sparsely populated until the 20th century. Its modern development is closely linked to the land reclamation of the Maremma and the post-war agrarian reform. The planned rural village was founded by the Ente Maremma on 23 December 1951, when the first stone was laid by Amintore Fanfani, then Minister of Agriculture. Originally named Villaggio del bracciante ("Farmworkers' Village"), the settlement was conceived as a service and social centre for newly established farms created through the dismantling of the latifundium system and attracted significant internal migration, particularly from northern Tuscany and Veneto.

The village was designed with a central area devoted to public services—including a church, school, sports field, medical and commercial facilities—and a residential area consisting of seventy-nine plots assigned to farming families, each comprising a dwelling and an adjoining parcel of agricultural land. The official inauguration of the completed village took place on 6 April 1953 in the presence of Fanfani and Giorgio La Pira, mayor of Florence.

== Main sights ==
- Church of Santa Maria Goretti, built in the early 1950s, it was designed by architect Carlo Boccianti, it was completed in 1953 and consecrated the following year. Between 1989 and 1993 the church has undergone a series of renovations, which have given it its present appearance.
- Fontana del Cinghialino (Fountain of the Little Boar), a fountain with the statue of a wild boar, a perfect reproduction of Porcellino by Pietro Tacca. The statue was donated to Rispescia by the city of Florence in 1953.

== Sources ==
- Aldo Mazzolai, Guida della Maremma. Percorsi tra arte e natura, Le Lettere, Florence, 1997.
- Nardini, Paolo; De Benetti, Massimo (2004). I veneti di Maremma: storia di una migrazione. Grosseto: Archivio delle tradizioni popolari della Maremma.
- Marcella Parisi, Grosseto dentro e fuori porta. L'emozione e il pensiero (Associazione Archeologica Maremmana e Comune di Grosseto), C&P Adver Effigi, Siena, 2001.
- Simoncelli, Antonio Valentino (1989). La Riforma fondiaria in Maremma (1950-1965). Grosseto.
- Simoncelli, Antonio Valentino (2008). Bonifiche nel Grossetano. Percorso storico dal 1200 ad oggi. Arcidosso: Effigi.

== See also ==
- Alberese
- Batignano
- Braccagni
- Istia d'Ombrone
- Marina di Grosseto
- Montepescali
- Principina a Mare
- Principina Terra
- Roselle, Italy
