= Marina di Grosseto =

- Frazione
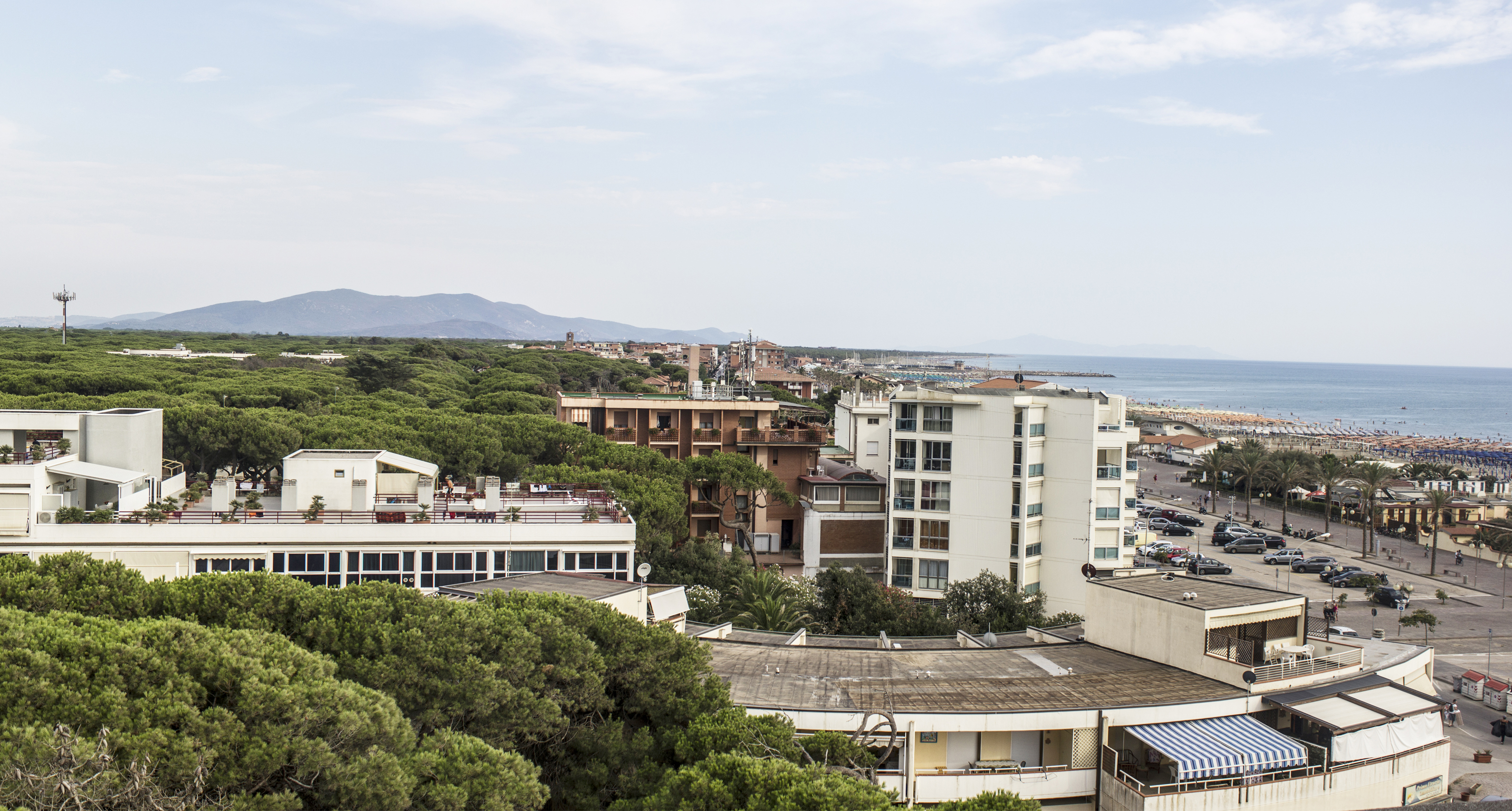
- View of Marina di Grosseto

- Location of Marina di Grosseto in Italy
- Coordinates: 42°42′55″N 10°59′02″E
- Country: Italy
- Region: Tuscany
- Province: Grosseto (GR)
- Comune: Grosseto
- Elevation: 3 m (9.8 ft)

Population (2010)
  - Total: 3,099
- Demonym: Marinesi
- Time zone: UTC+1 (CET)
  - Summer (DST): UTC+2 (CEST)
- Postal code: 58100
- Dialing code: 0564

Marina di Grosseto (Italian: [maˈriːna di grosˈseːto]) is a seaside resort and frazione of the municipality of Grosseto, in the Maremma area of Tuscany, Italy. Originally a small fishing village, it is known for its wide beaches overlooking the Tyrrhenian Sea, its extensive pine forest stretching between Castiglione della Pescaia and Bocca d'Ombrone, and the surrounding Mediterranean scrubland.

Owing to the cleanliness of its waters, Marina di Grosseto has been awarded the Blue Flag by the Foundation for Environmental Education and, in 2017, also received the Green Flag for accessibility.

== History ==
The origins of Marina di Grosseto are closely linked to the construction of Fort San Rocco, completed in 1793 under Grand Duke Ferdinand III of Lorraine as part of the coastal defence system of the Grand Duchy of Tuscany. The fort was built on the site of an earlier sanitary guard post established during the 18th century to monitor the coast during epidemics such as the plague of Marseille.

In 1838, during the reclamation works promoted by Grand Duke Leopold II, the San Rocco Canal was excavated to connect the inland marshlands with the sea. The canal soon became a small landing place and contributed to the development of the surrounding coastal area.

During the early 20th century, a small fishing community developed along the southern bank of the canal. The first church was built in 1923, followed by the construction of additional residential buildings and summer villas. In the late 1920s, the podestà of Grosseto, Ado Scaramucci, promoted the expansion of the settlement by authorizing the construction of villas and holiday homes on the northern side, fostering the rise of seaside tourism among Grosseto's middle and upper classes. In 1933, the first permanent bathing establishment, known as "La Rotonda", was inaugurated, and on 16 July of the same year the settlement officially changed its name from San Rocco to Marina di Grosseto. In 1938, the rationalist-style seaside colony "Ivo Saletti" was completed.

During World War II, the area was affected by the San Leopoldo massacre, carried out by retreating German troops on 12 June 1944 near the San Leopoldo Canal, in which six civilians were killed.

In 1954, the original church was demolished and replaced with a modern parish church. During the post-war economic boom, Marina di Grosseto developed rapidly as a major seaside resort of the area. New holiday facilities, hotels, and seaside colonies were built, including the "Bodoni", "Saragat", and "Snia Viscosa", the latter also known as Villa Gaia.

Towards the end of the 20th century, urban planning regulations sought to preserve the extensive pine forest surrounding the town. Nevertheless, the seafront underwent significant transformation, with the construction of taller apartment buildings, a new promenade, and the replacement of many early villas with holiday condominiums. In May 2005, the modern marina was inaugurated.

== Landmarks ==
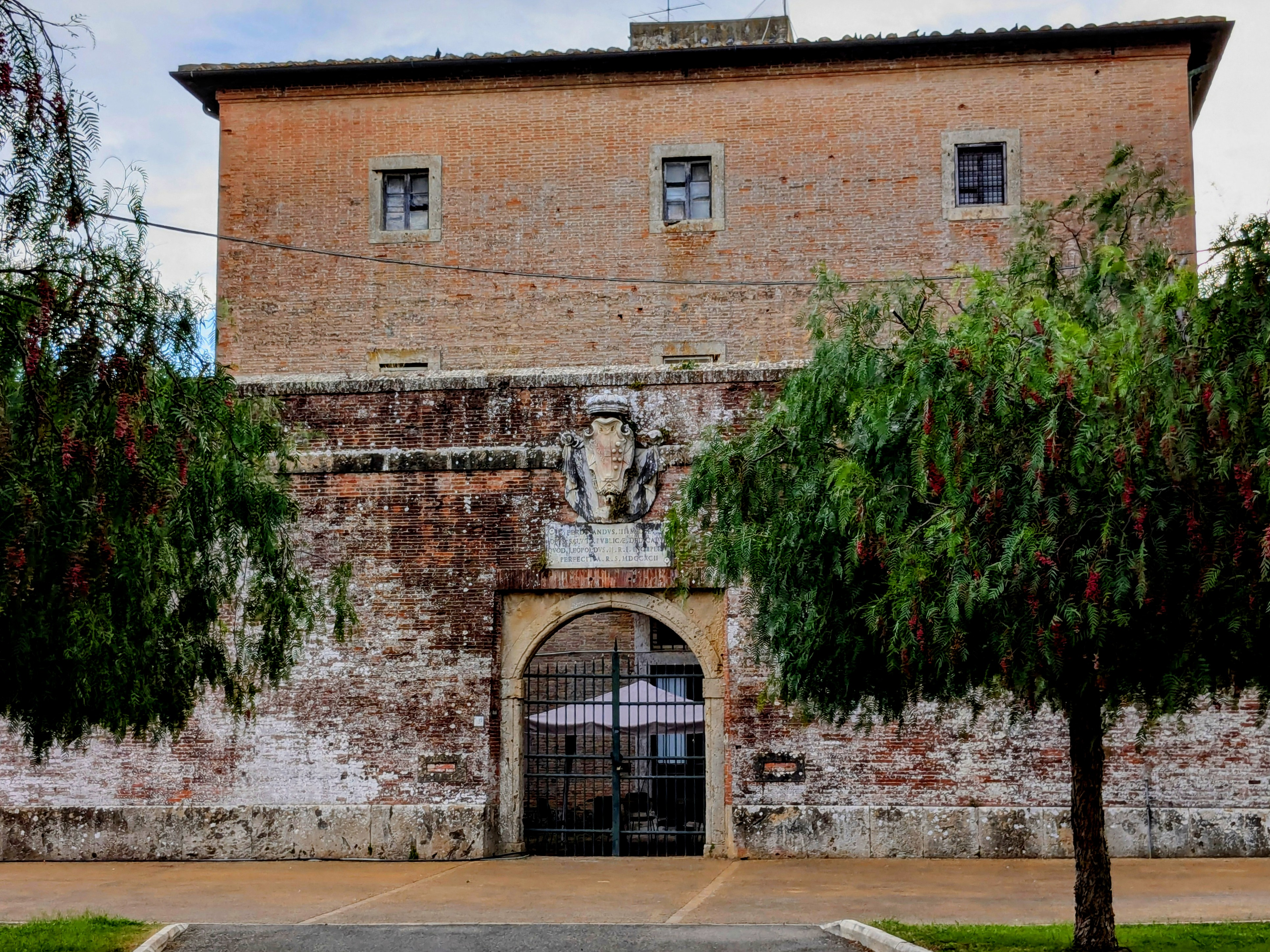
Fort San Rocco

=== Fort San Rocco ===
Fort San Rocco was built between 1788 and 1793 under the Grand Dukes Peter Leopold and Ferdinand III as part of the Tuscan coastal defence system. Constructed on the site of an earlier sanitary guard post, the fort became the original core around which the settlement of Marina di Grosseto later developed. The structure remained in military use until the late 20th century and is considered Marina's main historical landmark.

=== Church of San Rocco ===
The church of San Rocco (Saint Roch) is the parish church of Marina di Grosseto. Designed by engineer Ernesto Ganelli, it was consecrated in 1954 and replaced an earlier church built in 1923 and dedicated to Our Lady of Victory (Santa Maria della Vittoria). The interior is decorated with mosaics created in 1958 by artist Luciano Favret and frescoes painted by Arnaldo Mazzanti during the 1970s. The parish also extends to the nearby village of Principina a Mare.

=== La Rotonda ===
La Rotonda is a historic seaside establishment in Marina di Grosseto, built in 1933 to a design by engineer Umberto Tombari for the Società Anonima Grosseto al Mare (SAGAM). The structure originally formed a unified bathing complex with a distinctive semicircular layout, directly facing the beach and including changing cabins, service areas, and a panoramic terrace used as a social and leisure space. In its original configuration, the building was one of the main landmarks of the early tourist development of Marina di Grosseto during the interwar and postwar period.

In the following decades, especially between the late 1980s and early 2000s, the complex was progressively fragmented and partially absorbed into the expanding seafront urban fabric, following the construction of the modern promenade and adjacent residential buildings. Today, the seaside bathing facility retains the historic semicircular arrangement of the cabins along the beach, while the main building—long left unused—was restored in 2021 and converted into a bar and restaurant.

== Education ==
Public education in Marina di Grosseto is administered by the Institute "Orso Orsini" based in Castiglione della Pescaia. The village hosts a lower secondary school, the "Giovanni Fattori" middle school, located in the former seaside colony "San Rocco". Primary education is provided by the "Carlo Collodi" elementary school, while early childhood education is offered by the municipal kindergarten, both located in Via Baracca.

== Transport ==
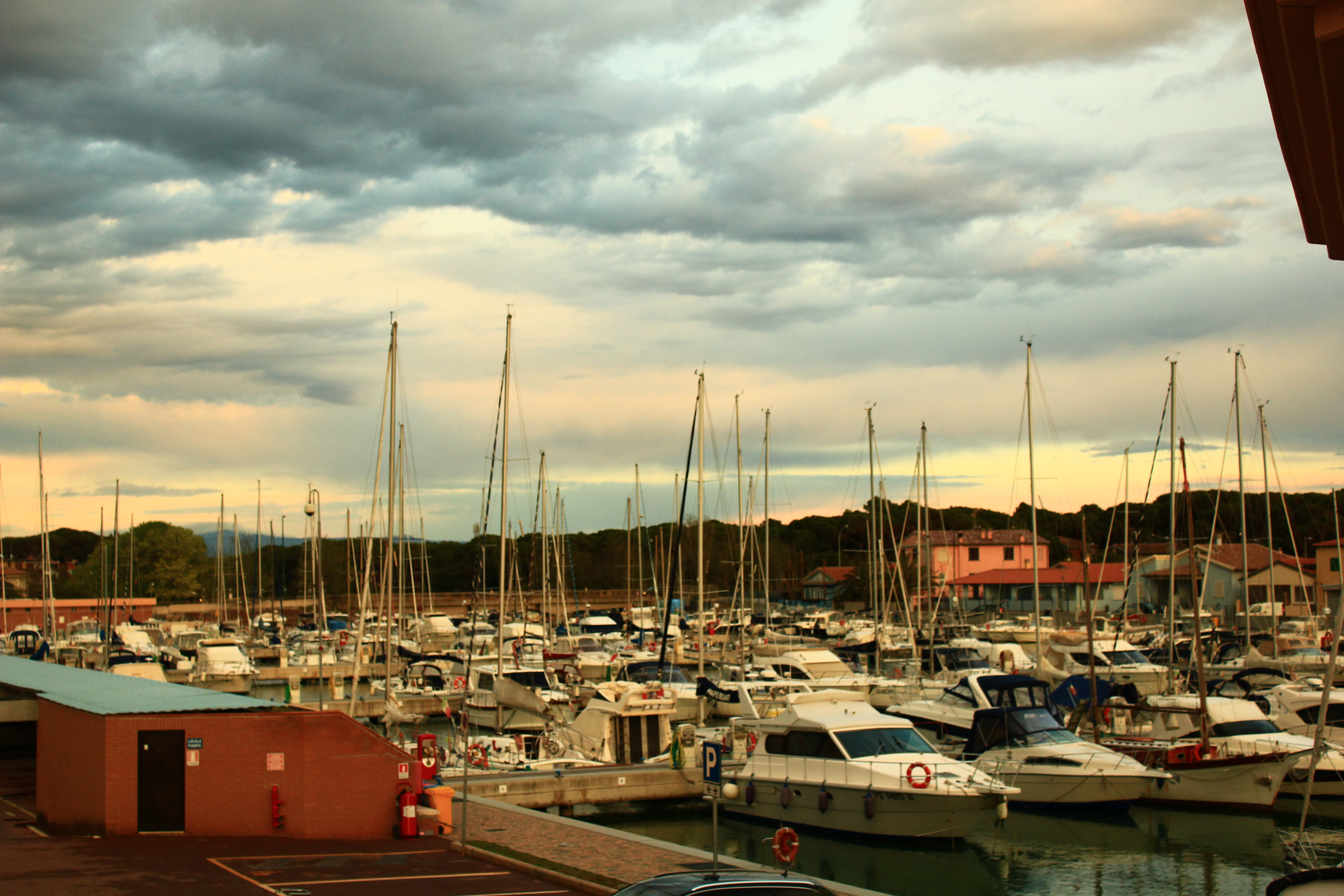
View of the marina

Marina di Grosseto is connected to the city of Grosseto and other centres in the Maremma region by the former state road SS322 delle Collacchie, now provincial road SP 158, which links Grosseto to Follonica.

The village is also served by the tourist harbour which functions as Grosseto's main marina and provides facilities for recreational boating along the Tyrrhenian coast. Inaugurated on 21 May 2005, it developed through the transformation of the historic mouth of the San Rocco Canal. The marina offers 557 berths, including 54 dedicated to transit vessels. It can accommodate boats up to 24 metres in length, with berthing depths of approximately 2.5 metres. The seabed is predominantly sandy, and the entrance channel has a depth of around 2.5 metres in favourable weather conditions, reducing to about 2.1 metres in less favourable conditions.

Cycling infrastructure includes several dedicated cycle paths: the Grosseto–Marina di Grosseto route, the Marina di Grosseto–Principina a Mare connection, and the coastal route linking Marina di Grosseto with Castiglione della Pescaia. These paths form part of a wider network of cycle tourism routes along the Grosseto coastline.

== Sources ==
- Guide d'Italia. Toscana. Milan: Touring Club Italiano. 2012. p. 892.
- Barontini, Corrado; Telloli, Gaetano (2002). Sciangai: cuore di Marina di Grosseto. Roccastrada: Il mio amico.
- Bueti, Serafina (1995). Il forte di San Rocco: una struttura militare nel sistema difensivo del litorale toscano del secolo 18. Grosseto: Archivio di Stato.
- Enrico Crispolti; Anna Mazzanti; Luca Quattrocchi, eds. (2006). Arte in Maremma nella prima metà del Novecento. Milano: Silvana Editoriale.
- Guerrini, Giuseppe (1989). Da San Rocco a Marina di Grosseto. 1789-1989. Pisa: Pacini.
- Innocenti, Mario; Innocenti, Stefano (1999). Marina di Grosseto. Il litorale maremmano da Bocca d'Ombrone al canale di San Leopoldo: dalle origini alla fine della seconda guerra mondiale. Grosseto: Innocenti.
- Mazzolai, Aldo (1997). Guida della Maremma. Percorsi tra arte e natura. Florence: Le Lettere. p. 22.
- Vellati, Elena; Fommei, Maria Serena (1996). Il nuovo forte di San Rocco. Da capanna a forte: storia di un edificio militare. Grosseto: I Portici.

== See also ==
- Alberese
- Batignano
- Braccagni
- Istia d'Ombrone
- Montepescali
- Principina a Mare
- Principina Terra
- Rispescia
- Roselle, Italy
