= Roselle, Italy =

Roselle
- Frazione
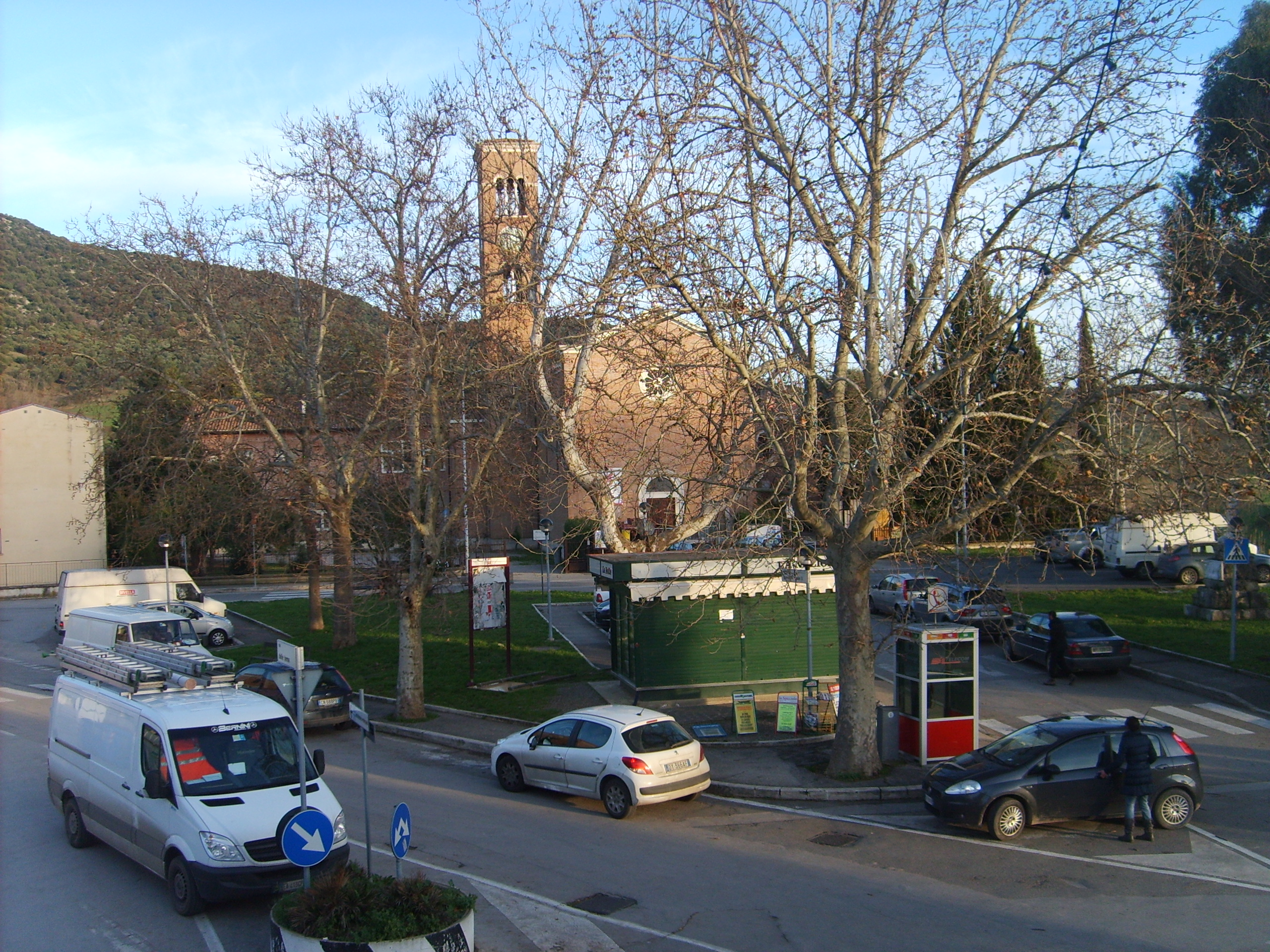
- The main square of the town

- Location of Roselle in Italy
- Coordinates: 42°49′42″N 11°09′33″E
- Country: Italy
- Region: Tuscany
- Province: Grosseto (GR)
- Comune: Grosseto
- Elevation: 25 m (82 ft)

Population (2015)
  - Total: 3,015
- Demonym: Rosellani
- Time zone: UTC+1 (CET)
  - Summer (DST): UTC+2 (CEST)
- Postal code: 58100
- Dialing code: 0564

Roselle (Italian: [roˈzɛlle]) is a frazione or village in the comune of Grosseto. The archaeological remains of the ancient city of Rusellae are located to the northeast of the modern settlement.

== History ==
Roselle originated in antiquity as an Etruscan city known as Rasela or Rusel, founded in the 7th century BC and replacing nearby Vetulonia as the dominant regional centre. Conquered by Rome in 294 BC, it became the municipium and later colony of Rusellae, experiencing significant urban development, including a forum, amphitheatre, and baths, and becoming an episcopal see in the 4th century AD. From the 6th century onwards, the population and economic focus gradually shifted to the lowlands along the Ombrone River, where Grossetum emerged. The transfer of the episcopal seat to Grosseto in 1138 by Pope Innocent II marked the definitive end of Rusellae's political and religious prominence.

The modern settlement of Roselle developed to the south of the ancient city, along the road connecting Grosseto and Siena. In the first half of the 17th century, Bishop Giovanni Battista Gori Pannilini commissioned the church of San Lorenzo as a place of rest and prayer for travellers. A renewed phase of settlement began in the early 19th century following land reclamation policies promoted by Leopold II of Tuscany, who inaugurated the Leopoldine Baths in 1824.

The village, also known as Bagno Roselle, subsequently developed around the thermal springs and was further consolidated in the 20th century with the construction of a parish church in 1938. Roselle later benefited from archaeological excavations in the 1950s and 1960s, which transformed the ancient city into an archaeological park and contributed to its development as a tourist destination.

== See also ==
- List of Catholic dioceses in Italy
- Alberese
- Batignano
- Braccagni
- Istia d'Ombrone
- Marina di Grosseto
- Montepescali
- Principina a Mare
- Principina Terra
- Rispescia

== Sources ==
- Mazzolai, Aldo (1960). Roselle e il suo territorio. Ricerche e documenti. Grosseto: STEM.
- Pifferi, Ermanno (1963). Storia delle terme di Roselle. Montecatini Terme: Tipografia delle Terme.
- Amante, Gianfranco; Innocenti, Mario (2001). Bagno di Roselle. Dalle origini alla fine della seconda guerra mondiale. Grosseto: Editrice Innocenti.
