= Braccagni =

- Frazione
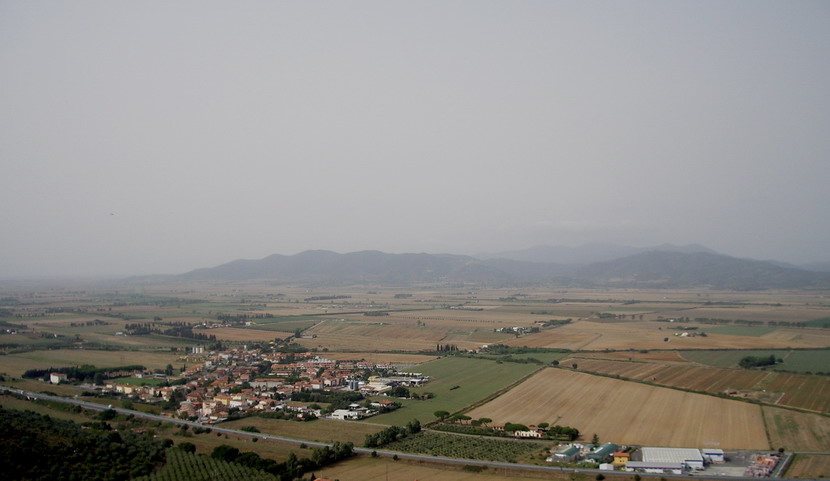

- Location of Braccagni in Italy
- Coordinates: 42°52′26″N 11°04′29″E
- Country: Italy
- Region: Tuscany
- Province: Grosseto (GR)
- Comune: Grosseto
- Elevation: 19 m (62 ft)

Population (2015)
  - Total: 1,513
- Demonym: Braccagnini
- Time zone: UTC+1 (CET)
  - Summer (DST): UTC+2 (CEST)
- Postal code: 58100
- Dialing code: 0564

Braccagni (Italian: [brakˈkaɲɲi]) is a village in Tuscany, administratively a frazione of the comune of Grosseto.

It is positioned in the northern part of the municipal territory, at the bottom of the hill of Montepescali.

== History ==
The village of Braccagni was founded in 1846 as an appendix of the frazione of Montepescali, but it increased as a nodal point of the economy of the area after the opening of its own station along the Tirrenica railway line in 1864.

== Main sights ==
- San Guglielmo d'Aquitania, main parish church in Braccagni, it was designed by engineer Ernesto Ganelli in 1940.
- Fattoria degli Aquisti with the chapel of Sant'Umberto

== Events ==
- Fiera del Madonnino, yearly Grosseto trade fair (40th edition in 2018)
- Festival del Maggio, held every first of May

== Transports ==
- Montepescali railway station: despite its name, it is located in Braccagni.

== See also ==
- Alberese
- Batignano
- Istia d'Ombrone
- Marina di Grosseto
- Montepescali
- Principina a Mare
- Principina Terra
- Rispescia
- Roselle, Italy

== Bibliography ==
- Bonifazi, Emilio (2015). Grosseto e i suoi amministratori dal 1944 al 2015. Grosseto: Editrice Innocenti.
- Ciarpaglini, Bruno (2002). Gente di Montepescali: come eravamo, ricordi e immagini di vita. Braccagni: La Sentinella.
