= Trappola marshland =

- Padule della Trappola
- Location within Italy
- Location: Grosseto, Tuscany, Italy
- Coordinates: 42°40′32″N 11°01′55″E

Ramsar Wetland
- Official name: Padule della Trappola–Foce dell'Ombrone
- Designated: 13 October 2016
- Reference no.: 2284

The Trappola marshland is a wetland in the municipality of Grosseto, Tuscany, Italy. It is located in the northern part of the Maremma Regional Park and lies near the Tyrrhenian coast a few kilometres south of Principina a Mare, just north of Bocca d'Ombrone, the mouth of the Ombrone River.

The area is characterised by brackish marshes that originally formed the southern extension of the ancient Lake Prile before large-scale land reclamation works carried out in the 18th century under the Grand dukes of Lorraine.

The marshland is notable for its biodiversity, particularly for migratory bird species that use the area as a wintering site. Traditional extensive grazing by Maremma cattle and horses continues to play a role in maintaining the ecological balance of the area. Within the wetland are several historical structures, including the tower of Trappola and the chapel of Santa Maria.

On 13 October 2016, the Trappola–Bocca d'Ombrone wetland was officially designated by the Secretariat of the Ramsar Convention as a wetland of international importance, under site number 2284. The site is protected under the Natura 2000 network as both a Special Area of Conservation (IT51A0039) and a Special Protection Area (IT51A0013).
