= Montepescali =

- Frazione
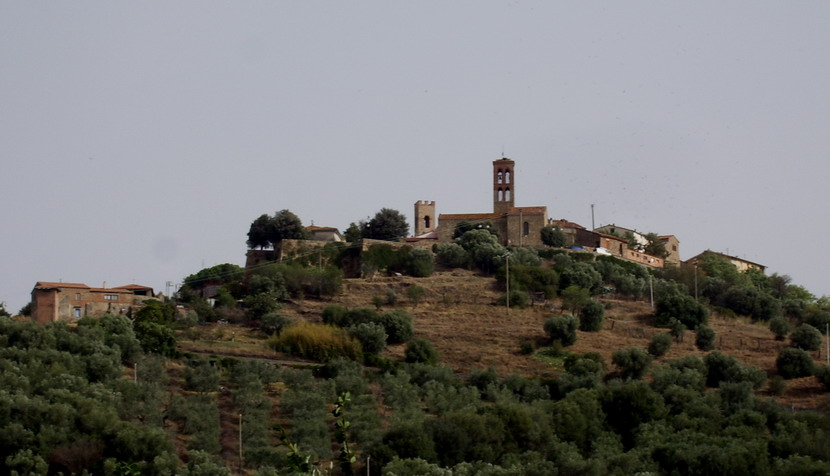

- Location of Montepescali in Italy
- Coordinates: 42°53′01″N 11°05′10″E
- Country: Italy
- Region: Tuscany
- Province: Grosseto (GR)
- Comune: Grosseto
- Elevation: 222 m (728 ft)

Population (2010)
  - Total: 275
- Demonym: Montepescalesi
- Time zone: UTC+1 (CET)
  - Summer (DST): UTC+2 (CEST)
- Postal code: 58100
- Dialing code: 0564

Montepescali (Italian: [ˌmontepeˈskaːli]) is a small town in southern Tuscany, Italy, a frazione of the comune of Grosseto. The site, from which the scenic panorama of the coastal strip and the Tuscan Archipelago up to Corsica can be seen, is also known as "Terrace or balcony of the Maremma".

== History ==
The town was built in the early Middle Ages as a fief of the Aldobrandeschi and then passed under the Republic of Siena. After Montepescali was annexed to the Grand Duchy of Tuscany, it was granted as a fief to the counts of Elci in 1627 and then passed on to the Ptolemies, to the Guadagni and finally to the Federighi. It became part of the municipality of Roccastrada in 1783, after the administrative reform by grand duke Peter Leopold.

In 1905, Montepescali was annexed to the municipality of Grosseto.

== Main sights ==
=== Military architecture ===
- Walls of Montepescali. From the Middle Ages (with some later changes later) they formed an elliptical shape enclosing the entire village. The defensive functions are confirmed by the presence of some towers, leaning at regular intervals along the outer perimeter, and a bulwark at the southern ends added during the 16th century.
- Tower of Belvedere, of medieval origins. It presents a semicircular section, leaning against the wall on the west side just north of Porta Vecchia; the Church of the Santissima Annunziata stood outside the circle in its vicinity.
- Tower of Guascone, one of the oldest towers. It stands leaning against the north-eastern part of the wall, not far from Porta Nuova. It presents a rectangular section, and it is dedicated to the commander of the troops who defended Montepescali from the siege of 1555.
- Porta Vecchia and Porta Nuova, the two doors of the walls.
- Three-pointed bulwark, a feature added to the Roman fortress in the 16th century. Its various renovations of the last century have transformed it into a rooftop terrace.

=== Palazzi ===
- Cassero Senese, a medieval architectural complex that includes the clock tower. It was originally the Convent and Church of Santa Cecilia, then destroyed and became firstly a fortress of the Aldobrandeschi and then a cassero of the Sienese, who later renovated it into a Courthouse.
- Palazzo dei Priori, of medieval origin, was the headquarters of the free commune of Montepescali; after the latter lost its independence, the building was sold to some individuals who have renovated it several times at later dates. These altered its appearance, while maintaining the stylistic elements of the construction period.
- Palazzo Grottanelli
- Palazzo Guadagni
- Palazzo Guicciardini Corsi Salviati
- Palazzo Tolomei
- Palazzo Lazzeretti Concialini

=== Churches ===
- Church of San Niccolò (11th century), preserving a cycle of frescoes of the Sienese school dated 1389.
- Church of Santi Stefano e Lorenzo, dating from the twelfth century and it also conserved frescoes of the Sienese school (14th century).
- Church of the Santissima Annunziata, built during the 14th century outside the walls in front of the Tower of Belvedere, in subsequent centuries it has been completely transformed into a residential building, losing its original appearance.
- The medieval church of San Leonardo, now destroyed.
- The Cemetery, built in the 18th century at the behest of the Duke Peter Leopold of Tuscany, it is at the foot of the village.
- Church of the Madonna delle Grazie, built outside the country in the 13th century and enlarged in the 17th century. It was deconsecrated and deprived of its decor in the 18th century. Now it is a ruin.
- Hermitage of Santa Maria Maddalena, a ruin with style elements from the Romanesque period. It was the seat of Guglielmites before its final abandonment occurred in the 18th century.

=== Museums ===
- Museum of local history Ildebrando Imberciadori, the ethnographic museum of the town. The exhibit areas are home to a collection of farm machinery and tools of farm life, but there is also archaeological evidence and documents that illustrate that a very long time passed between the Etruscan period and the Roman period, the Middle Ages and the Medici era.

== Transports ==
- Montepescali railway station

== Gallery ==
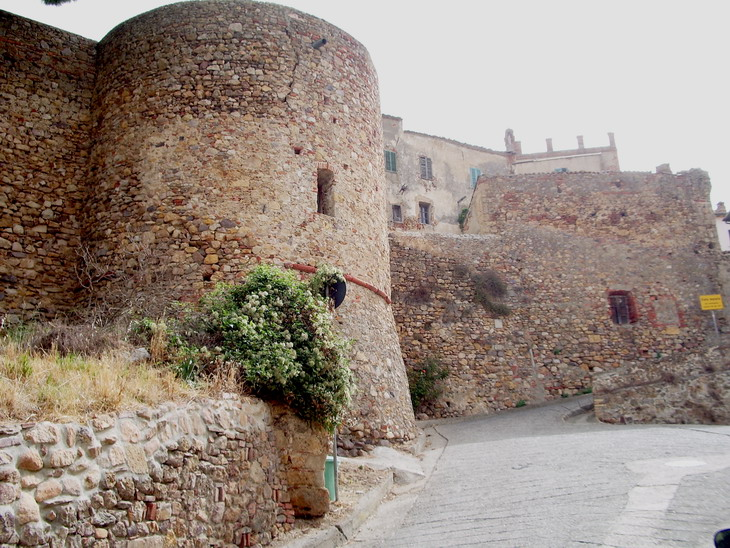
The Walls

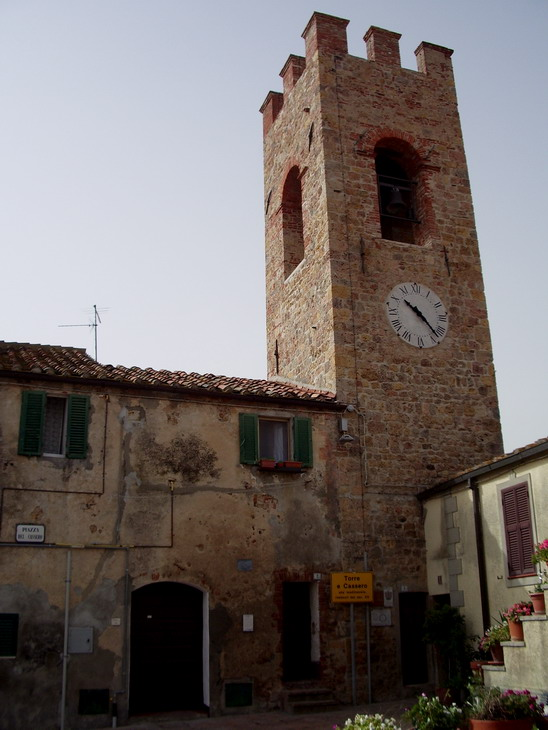
The tower of Cassero

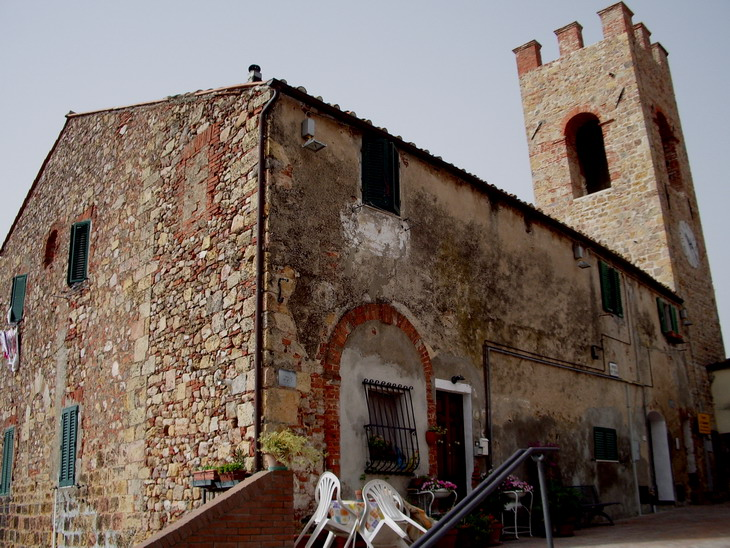
The Cassero

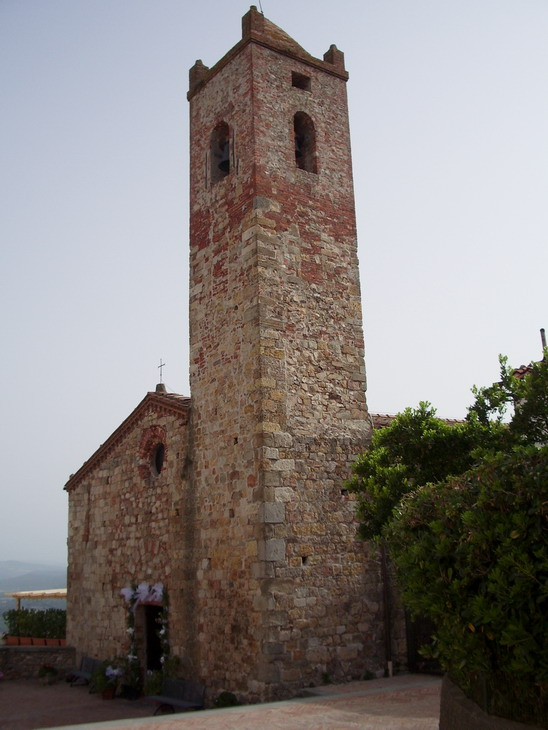
Church of San Niccolò

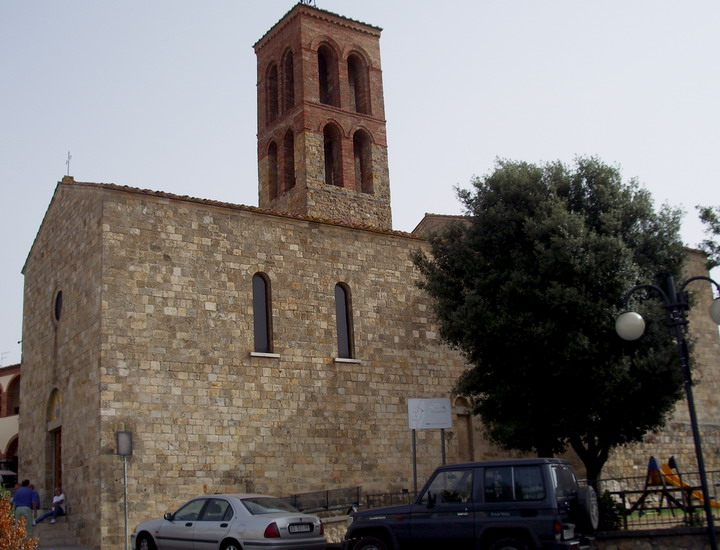
Church of Santi Stefano e Lorenzo

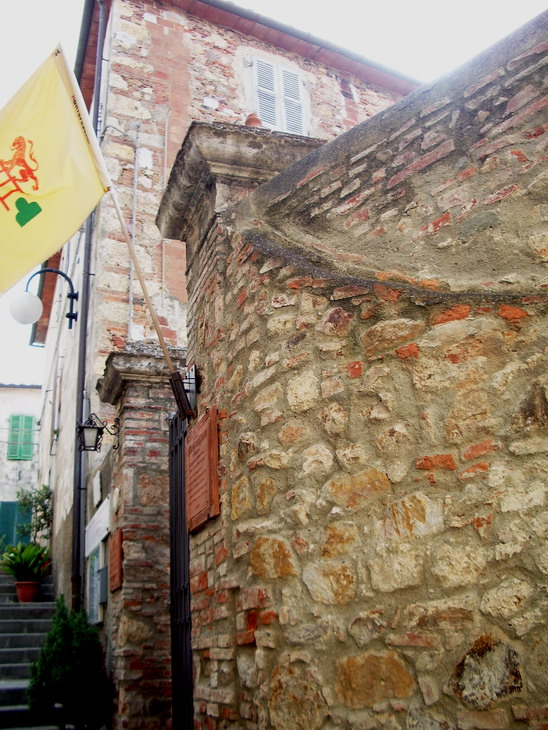
Museum of History

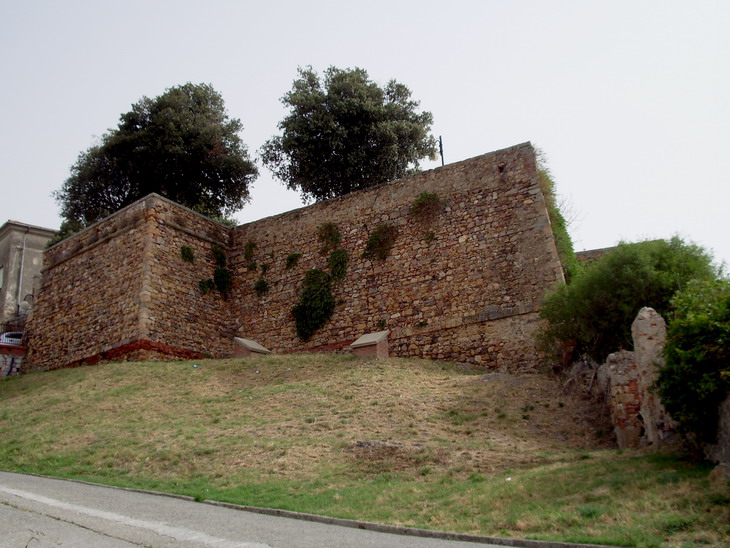
The baluardo a tre punte

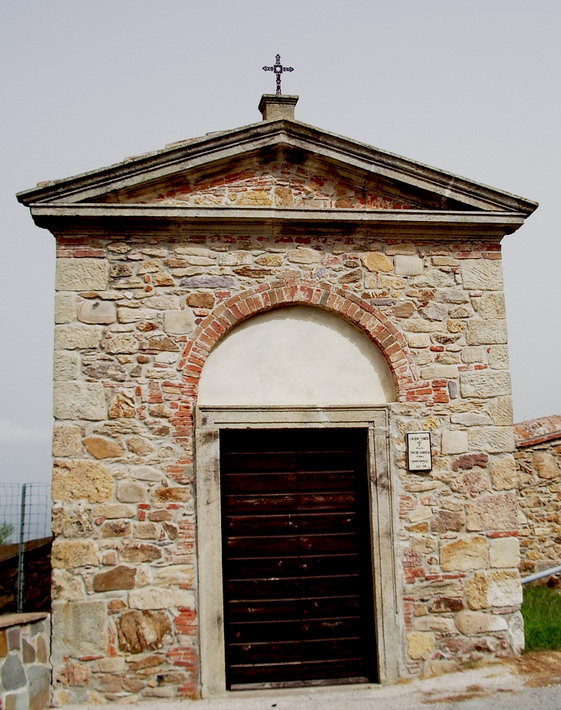
The cemetery

== Sources ==
- Aldo Mazzolai. Guida della Maremma. Percorsi tra arte e natura. Florence, Le Lettere, 1997.
- Giuseppe Guerrini. Torri e Castelli della provincia di Grosseto (Amministrazione Provinciale di Grosseto). Siena, Nuova Immagine Editrice, 1999.
- Carlo Citter. Guida agli edifici sacri della Maremma. Siena, Nuova Immagine Editrice, 2002.

== See also ==
- Grosseto
- Maremma
- Alberese
- Batignano
- Braccagni
- Istia d'Ombrone
- Marina di Grosseto
- Principina a Mare
- Principina Terra
- Rispescia
- Roselle, Italy
