= Batignano =

- Frazione
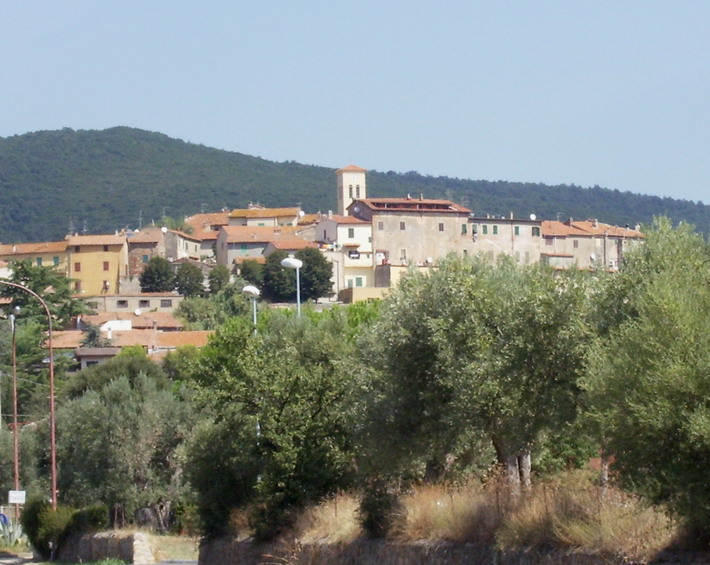

- Location of Batignano in Italy
- Coordinates: 42°52′09″N 11°10′04″E
- Country: Italy
- Region: Tuscany
- Province: Grosseto (GR)
- Comune: Grosseto
- Elevation: 150 m (490 ft)

Population (2010)
  - Total: 741
- Demonym: Batignanesi
- Time zone: UTC+1 (CET)
  - Summer (DST): UTC+2 (CEST)
- Postal code: 58041
- Dialing code: 0564

Batignano (Italian: [batiɲˈɲaːno]) is a small town in southern Tuscany, a frazione of the comune of Grosseto, positioned at about 10 km north-east of the capital on one of the last foot-hills of the valley of Ombrone which dominated the ancient city of Roselle.

== Geography ==
The hill on which the town of Batignano stands is as pertaining between the southern foot-hills of the Monte Leoni, which arises between the homonymous area and those of Montepescali, Sticciano and Montorsaio, exceeding on the highest peak the altitude of 600 metres.

== History ==
Of uncertain origins, Batignano developed in the Medieval period, around the castle which controlled the outlet of the road towards Siena on the plain of Grosseto and some lead and silver mines. It was a feud of the Aldobrandeschi and in 1213 belonged to Manto da Grosseto. In the 14th century, it then passed under the dominion of Siena, hosting many immigrants from Corsica, and so in the Grand Duchy of Tuscany. In 1783, it was annexed to the comune of Grosseto.

== Main sights ==
Batignano is a characteristic suburb which conserves ruins of the town walls, with towers and gates, and a cassero, aside from a triple-arched loggiato, built with reused materials (Roman columns and capitals), probably originating from Roselle. All this gives the town a certain tone of antiquity. To emphasize is also the presence of a parish and an ancient convent, now deconsecrated, situated outside the locality.

=== Military architecture ===
- Walls of Batignano, fortified walls of the town.
- Torre Quadrata, a square tower.
- Porta Senese, one of the two doors of the walls.
- Porta Grossetana, one of the two doors of the walls.

=== Palazzi ===
- Palazzo Iacometti
- Palazzo Baccellieri
- Palazzo del Loggiato

=== Churches ===
- Pieve di San Martino, originally situated outside the centre, it has a Romanesque style, with traces of frescoes of the Sienese school conserved in its inside.
- Brotherhood Church of San Giuseppe, of Baroque style, presents valuable decorations in its inside.
- Oratorio di San Michele Arcangelo, place of abolished worship which originally conserved the wooden statue of the saint now placed inside the parish.
- Convent of Santa Croce, positioned outside the town, it conserves some frescoes, even though it was transformed into a private residence after its abandonment and its consequent deconsecration.

== Gallery ==
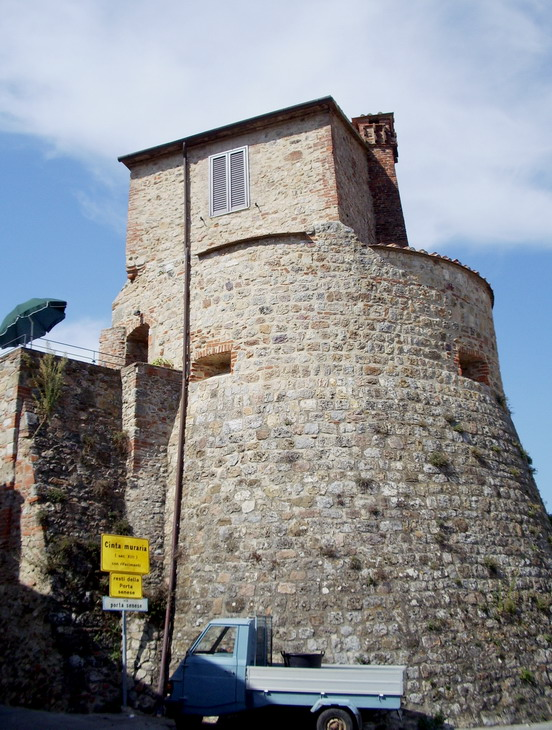
Porta Senese

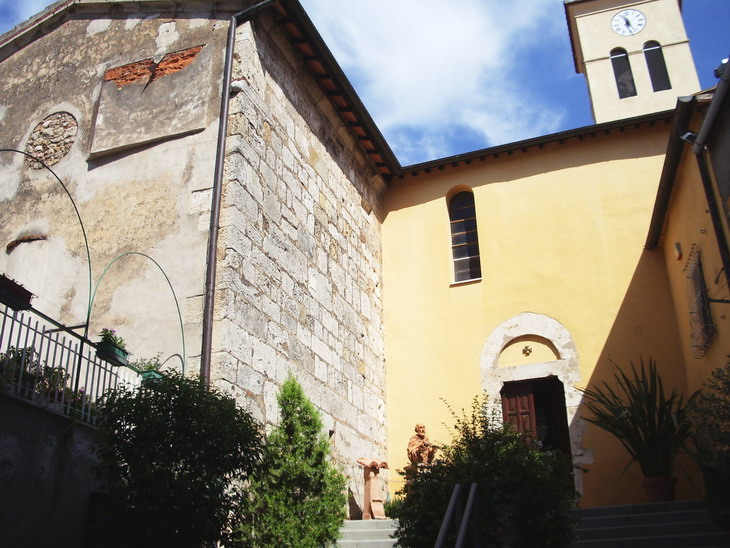
The Pieve di San Martino

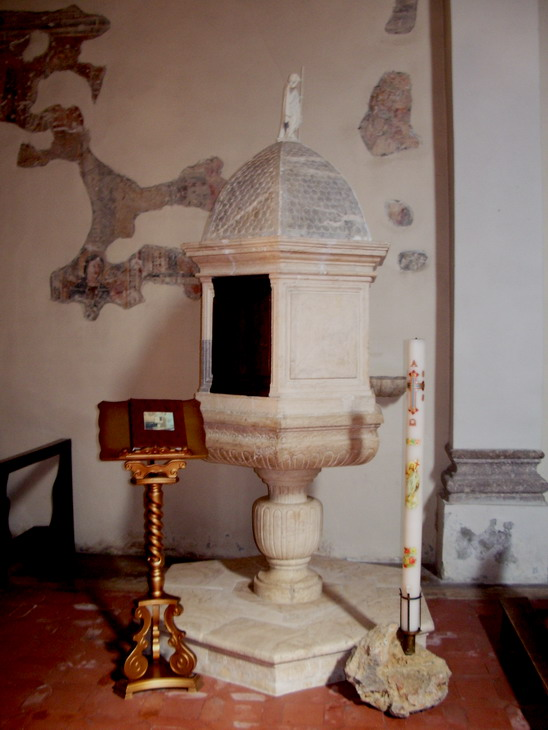
The baptismal font in the Pieve

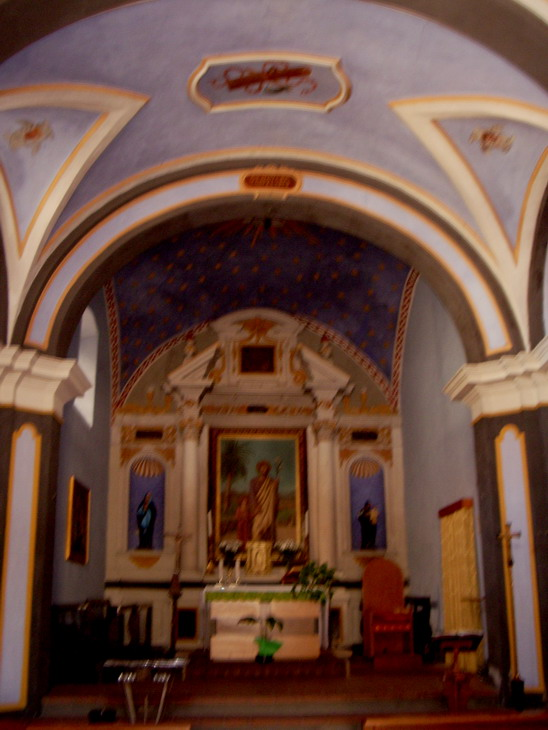
The interior of the church of San Giuseppe

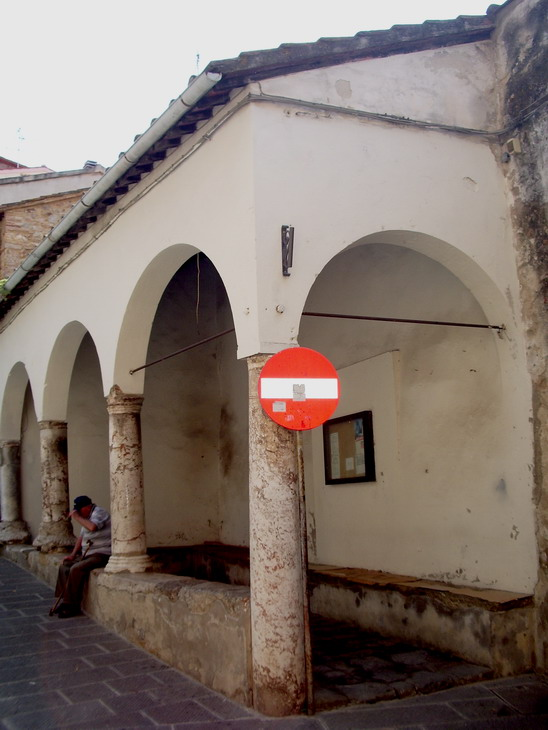
Loggiato

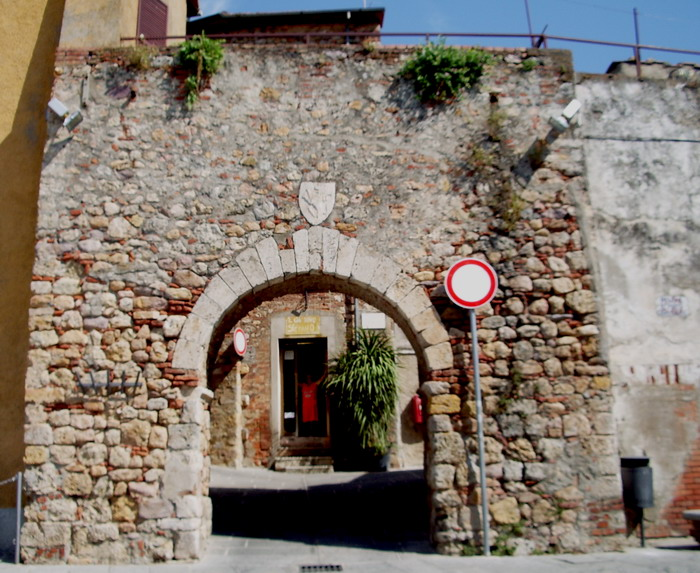
The outer side of the Porta Grossetana

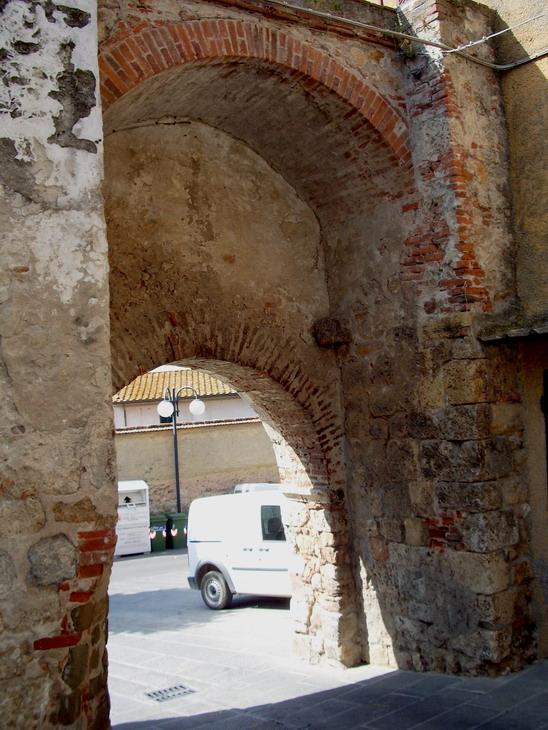
The inner side of the Porta Grossetana

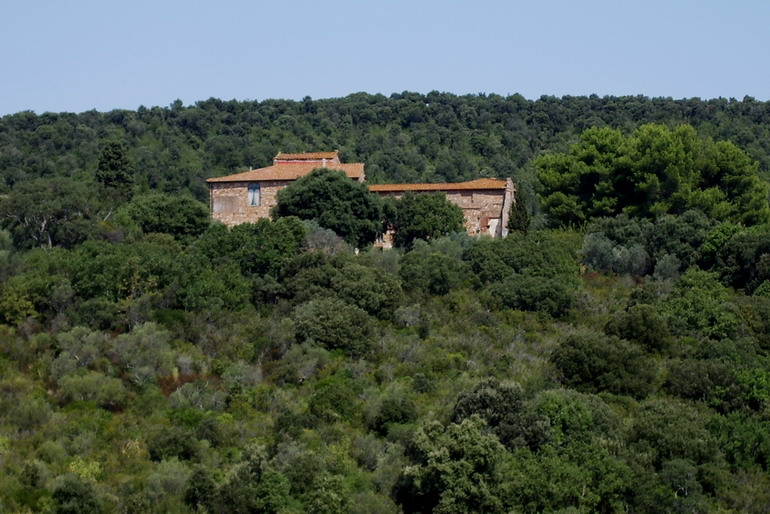
The Convent of Santa Croce

== See also ==
- Grosseto
- Maremma
- Alberese
- Braccagni
- Istia d'Ombrone
- Marina di Grosseto
- Montepescali
- Principina a Mare
- Principina Terra
- Rispescia
- Roselle, Italy

== Sources ==
- Aldo Mazzolai. Guida della Maremma. Percorsi tra arte e natura. Florence, Le Lettere, 1997.
- Giuseppe Guerrini. Torri e Castelli della provincia di Grosseto (Amministrazione Provinciale di Grosseto). Siena, Nuova Immagine Editrice, 1999.
- Carlo Citter. Guida agli edifici sacri della Maremma. Siena, Nuova Immagine Editrice, 2002.
