= Festambiente =

Environmental and music festival in Grosseto, Italy

- Frequency: Annual
- Locations: Rispescia, Grosseto, Italy
- Established: 1989
- Organizer: Legambiente
- Website: festambiente.it

Festambiente is the national festival of Legambiente, held annually in August in Grosseto, Italy.

Established in 1989, the festival takes place at Legambiente's National Center for Sustainable Development, located in the former ENAOLI Farmhouse in Rispescia, near the entrance to the Maremma Regional Park, about 6 km south of Grosseto. Recognized as a significant environmental event in Europe, Festambiente attracts over 80,000 visitors each year.

The festival features talks, debates, and performances aimed at raising awareness on topics such as healthy eating, environmental and cultural heritage conservation, and the protection of local traditions and cultures. A key highlight of the event is its live music concerts, which close each day of the festival. Artists who performed multiple times at Festambiente include Francesco De Gregori, Vinicio Capossela, Elio e le Storie Tese, Daniele Silvestri, Edoardo Bennato, Alborosie, Quartiere Coffee, Modena City Ramblers, Bandabardò, Caparezza, Roy Paci, Max Gazzè, and Afterhours.
