= Bocca d'Ombrone =

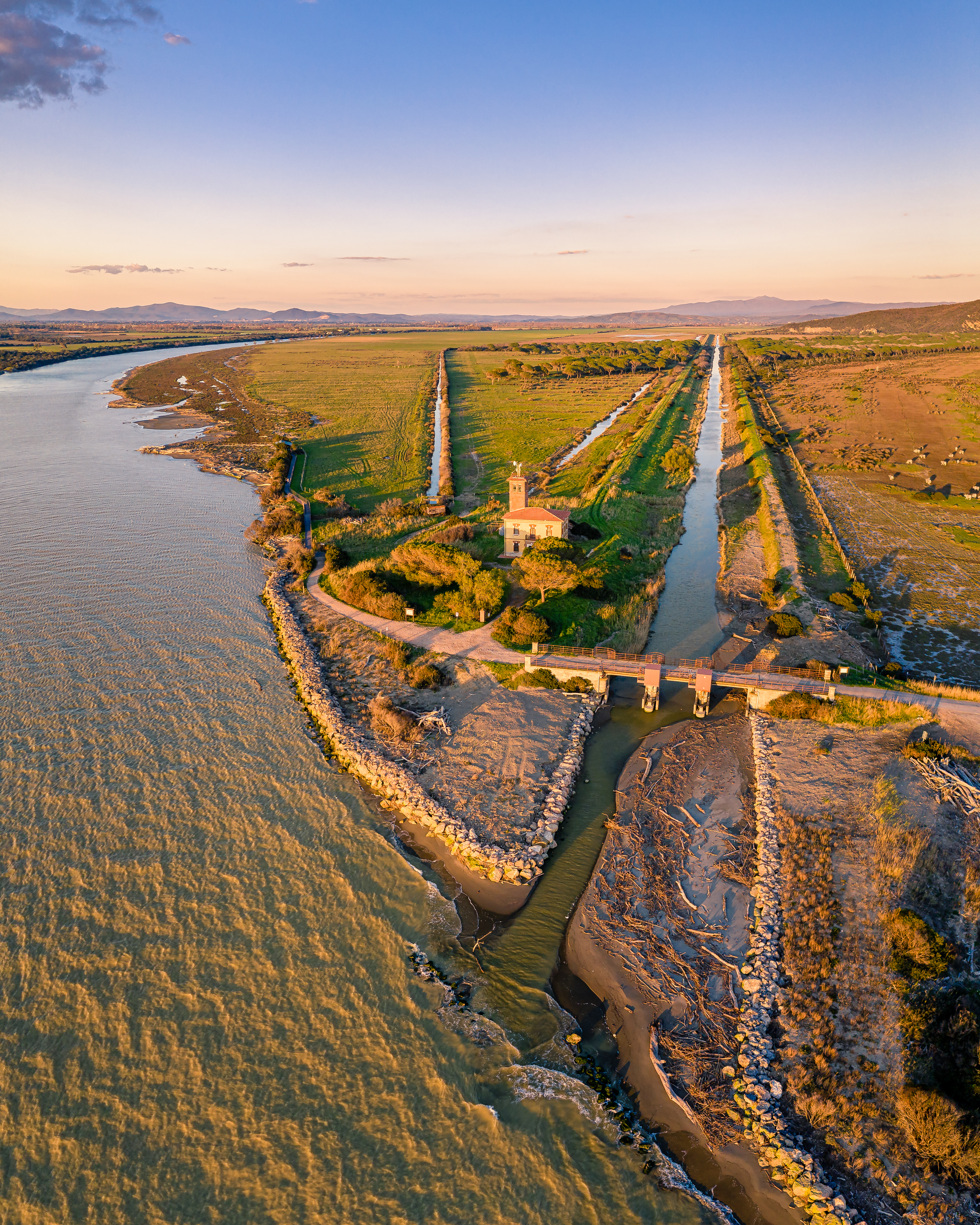
- Aerial view of the southern side of Bocca d'Ombrone

- Location within Italy
- Location: Grosseto, Tuscany, Italy
- Coordinates: 42°40′N 11°01′E

Ramsar Wetland
- Official name: Padule della Trappola–Foce dell'Ombrone
- Designated: 13 October 2016
- Reference no.: 2284

Bocca d'Ombrone is the mouth of the Ombrone River, located within the Maremma Regional Park near Grosseto, Tuscany, Italy. It marks the point where the river flows into the Tyrrhenian Sea, forming a dynamic coastal environment shaped by the interaction between fluvial sediment deposition and marine erosion. The area is accessible from Marina di Alberese via marked walking trails crossing pine forest, Mediterranean scrub, and coastal plains, and from the beach of Principina a Mare on the northern side, where the Trappola marshland is located.

The surrounding coastal plain has been largely formed by sediments transported by the Ombrone over millennia, with its extent varying according to historical patterns of erosion and reforestation in the inland areas. The area includes wetlands, seasonal freshwater pools known as chiari, salt-tolerant vegetation such as salicornia and limonium, and stretches of Mediterranean scrub and pine forest.

Bocca d'Ombrone is an area of significant natural interest and biodiversity and is frequented by numerous bird species, making it a notable site for birdwatching. The landscape reflects the traditional features of the Maremma coastal environment and is characterized by ongoing geomorphological processes and hydraulic management works.

On 13 October 2016, the Trappola–Bocca d'Ombrone wetland was officially designated by the Secretariat of the Ramsar Convention as a wetland of international importance, under site number 2284.
