= Rusellae =

Ancient town of Etruria

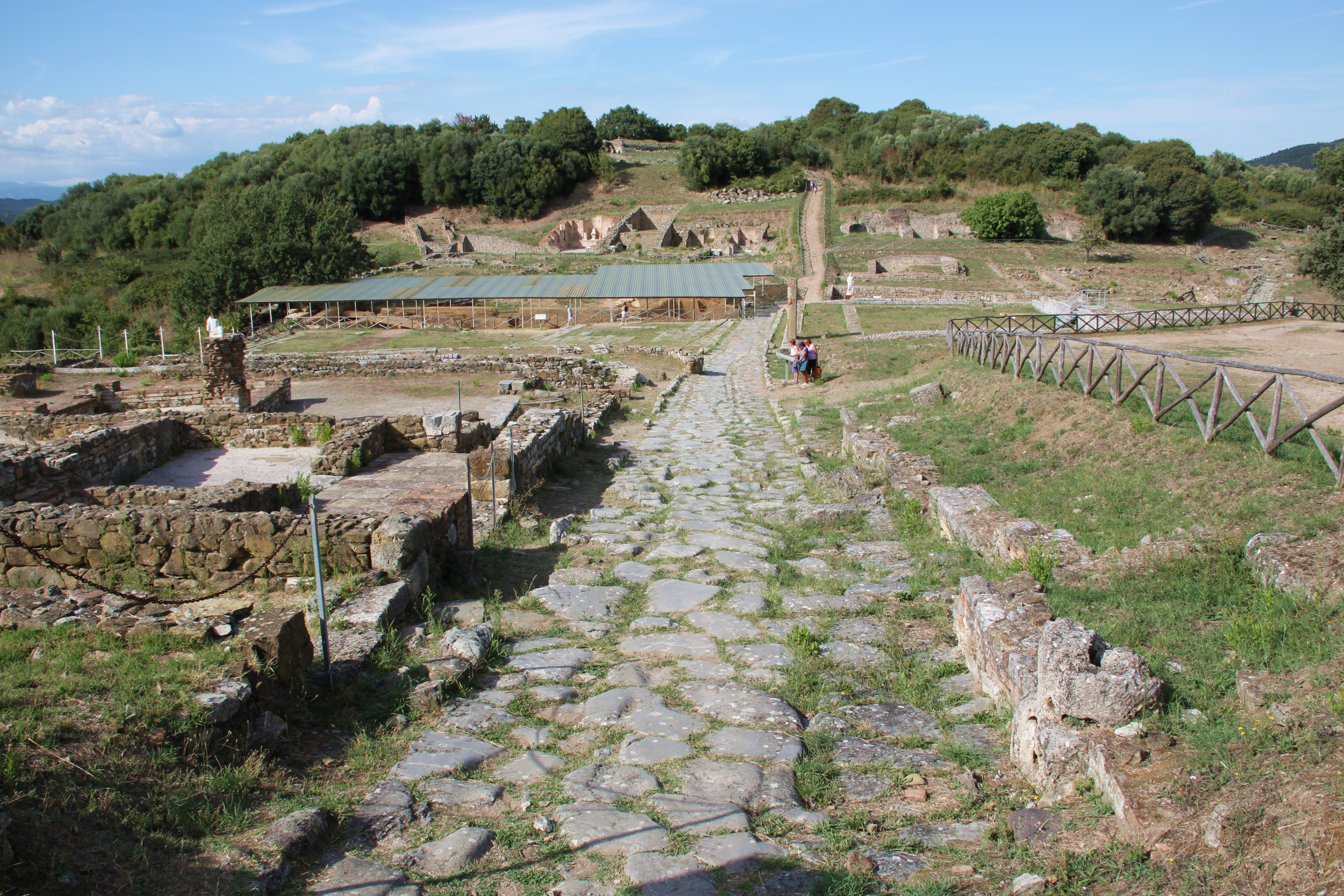
- The archaeological site of Rusellae

- Location within Tuscany
- 42.8276°N 11.16335°E
- Type: Settlement
- Cultures: Etruscan, Roman
- Location: Roselle, Italy
- Region: Tuscany

Site notes
- Archaeologists: Clelia Laviosa
- Public access: Partial

Rusellae was an important ancient town of Etruria, Italy, which survived until the Middle Ages before being abandoned. The impressive archaeological remains lie in the modern frazione of Roselle (Italian: [roˈzɛlle]), near the city of Grosseto, Tuscany.

The remains of the ancient buildings were brought to light by means of a long campaign of excavations carried out under archaeologist Clelia Laviosa beginning in the 1950s. More recent work has revealed many more impressive buildings.

== Geography ==
Roselle was located at the point of transition between the valley of Ombrone and the Maremma of Grosseto, on the shore of the ancient lake Prile (the ancient Lacus Prelius).

The ruins are about 15 kilometres (9 mi) southeast of Vetulonia and 8 kilometres (5 mi) northeast of Grosseto. They are situated on a hill with two summits, the higher of which is 194 metres (636 ft) above sea level. One summit is occupied by a Roman amphitheatre, the other by a tower of uncertain date. The local travertine was extensively used as a building material.

Roman remains have also been found 3 kilometres (2 mi) to the south, at hot springs used for public bathing to this day.

Excavations have revealed the newly identified Roman port on the Ombrone River, located within the Maremma National Park. The port provided an important commercial focus for the ancient city of Rusellae and for the exchange of goods around the Via Aurelia. The port is associated with a temple dedicated to Diana Umbronesis, set on a rocky promontory to the south, which acted as a ‘marker’ for the coastal trade in the area. This sanctuary together with a second, Severan temple are part of ongoing excavations.

== History ==
The first traces of settlement are shown in layers containing relics of Villanovan and at the end of 7th, early 6th century BC. Founded as a city in the 7th century BC, it was quoted by Dionysius of Halicarnassus as one of the cities that brought help to the Latins in the war against the Roman king Tarquinius Priscus. It developed to the detriment of neighbouring cities in particular Vetulonia.

Rusellae was associated with, but not actually one of, the twelve cities of the Etruscan Confederation. The discovery of Attic vases with red figures testifies to the city's commercial contacts with Greece and the Greek colonies of Southern Italy. The Romans captured it in 294 BC. In 205 BC, it contributed grain and timber for the fleet of Scipio Africanus. A colony was founded here either by the Triumviri or by Augustus.

The Diocese of Roselle was established in 490.

In 935 the town was destroyed by Saracens. It was not rebuilt because of a malaria epidemic.

In 1138 the diocese was suppressed and the site deserted, although still occasionally used. The episcopal see was transferred to Grosseto.

== Archaeology ==
=== City wall ===
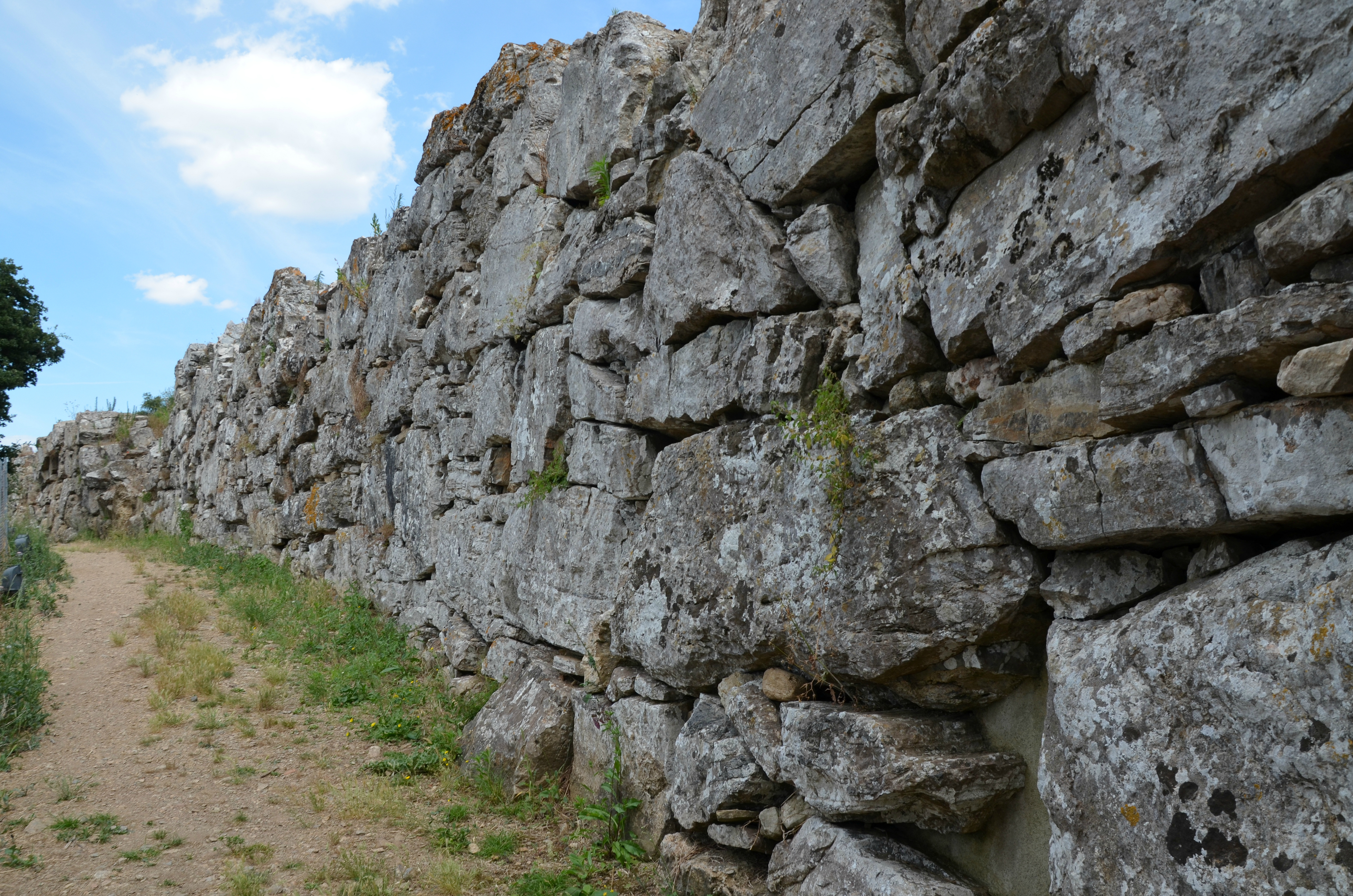
Etruscan city walls

The impressive cyclopean walls were built by the Etruscans between the 7th and 6th centuries BC. The perimeter of the city wall is over 3 km, with an average height of about 7 m. The walls consist of irregular, unworked blocks of travertine often measuring as much as 2.75 by 1.2 metres (9.0 by 3.9 ft)

=== Roman amphitheatre ===
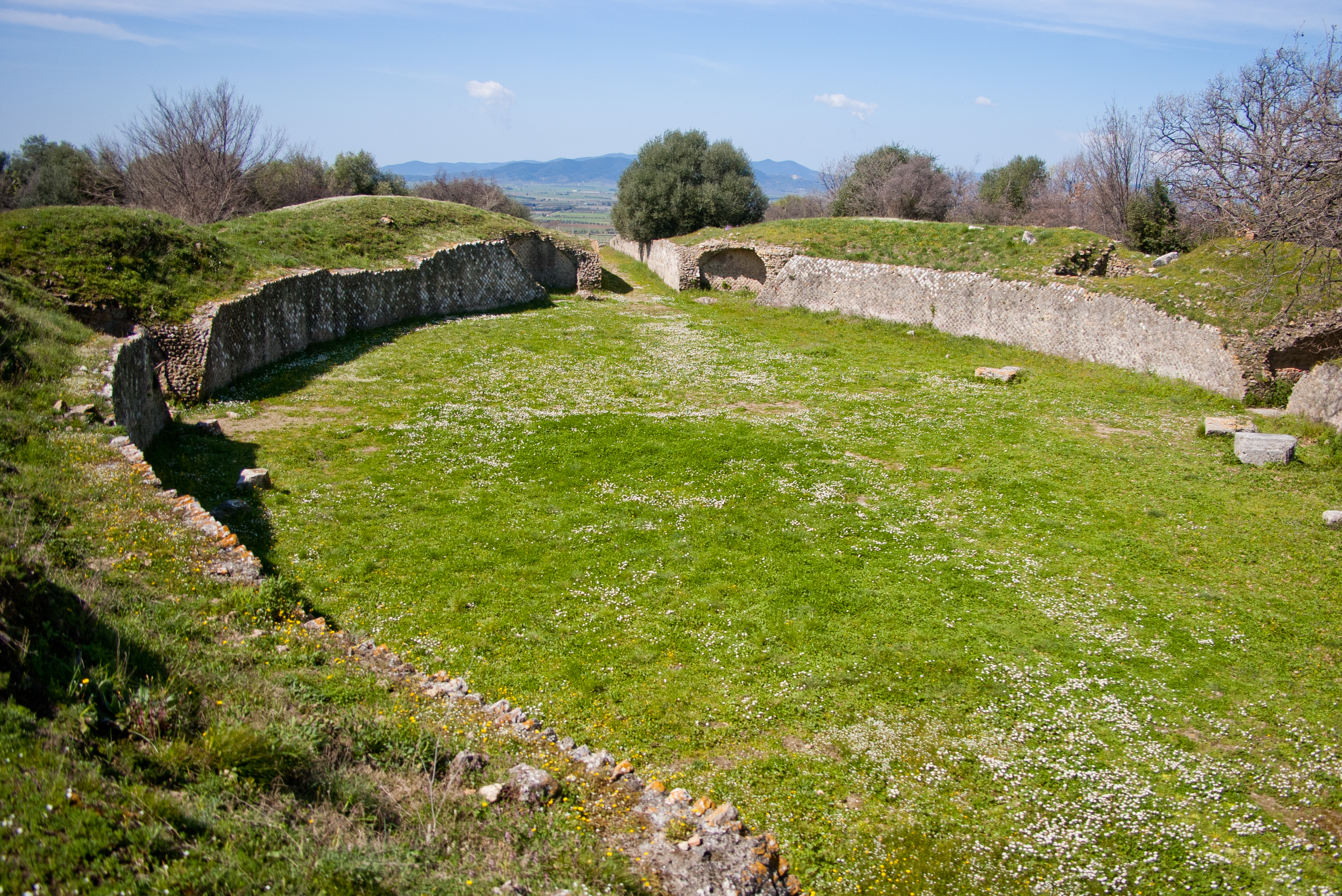
Roman Amphitheatre of Rusellae

On the top of the hill north of the city, the amphitheatre dates from the 1st century AD and is the only one known among Etruscan coastal towns. The earth removed to create the arena was probably used as a base for the banks of seating.

The walls of opus reticulatum date from the early 1st century AD confirmed by the discovery of "sealed" Arretine ceramic. Inside the arena along the major axis, four stones aligned with regularly spaced holes were discovered that were probably used to divide with stage scenery.

During the early Middle Ages the building became a fortified enclosure using additional material from other Roman buildings, and in defence of Byzantine territories against the advance of the Lombards.

This area remained occupied until at least the 16th century, as evidenced by the various fragments of archaic majolica.

=== House of the Mosaics ===
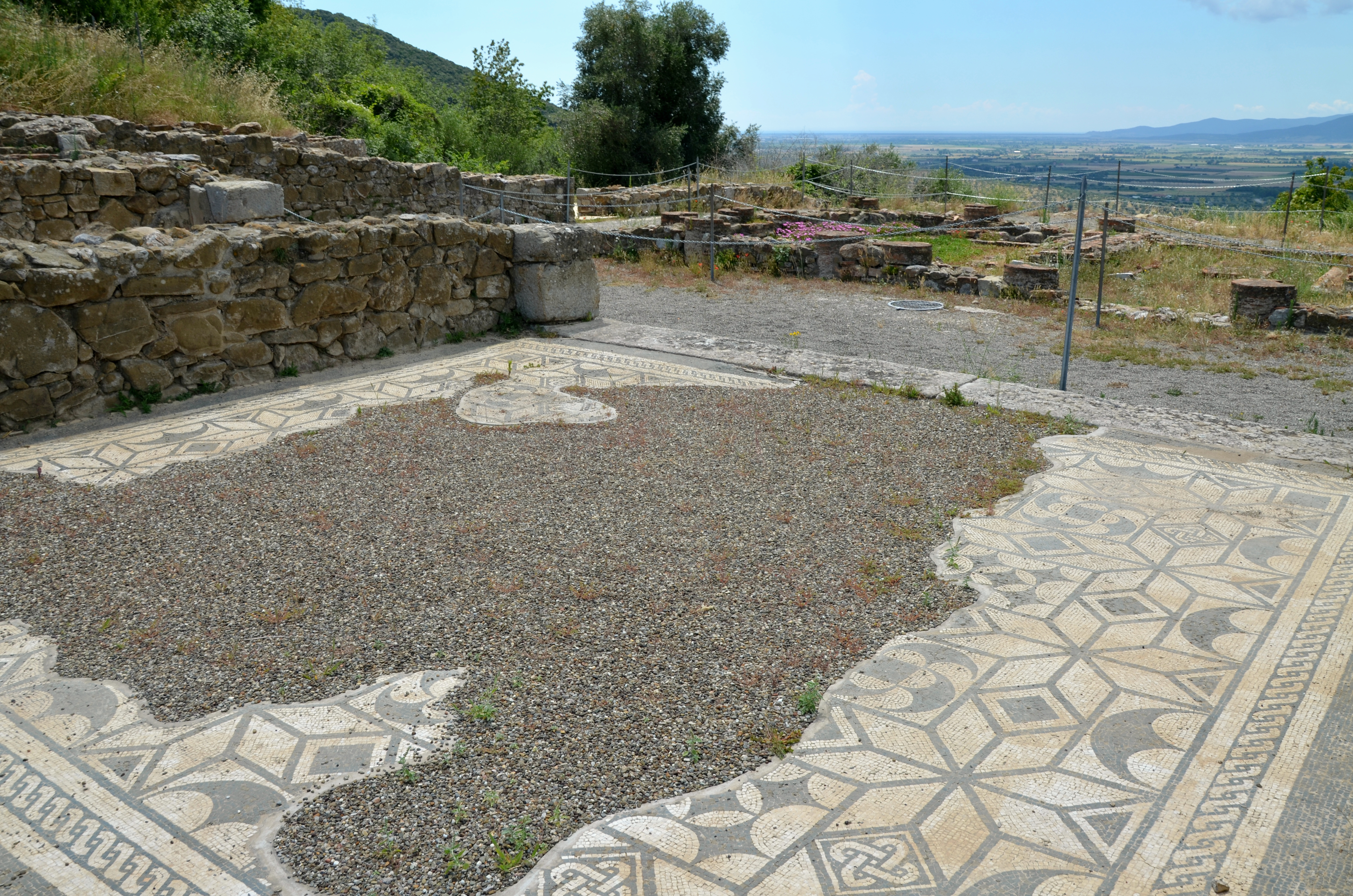
Mosaic in the tablinum

The first traces of the house (domus) date back to the late republican period. After extensive destruction in 90–80 BC, it was enlarged and restored, as well as enriched with three statues of Tiberius, Livia and Drusus Minor. During the Claudian era there was a partial destruction, perhaps due to a fire, followed by an immediate restoration. At the same time the house and its baths in the southern half became public rather than residential.

In the late Hadrianic or Antonine era the structure was subjected to heavy restructuring with the raising and widening of the baths and its appendages: this phase witnessed the installation of mosaics in the baths and tablinum. Other changes affected the position of the columns and fountain peristyle, while the small laconicum was adorned with stucco decorations in high relief.

The house underwent substantial transformation between the 4th to 7th centuries and in late antiquity a shop occupied the former living rooms. The workshop of a locksmith produced thick layers of ash, coal and waste disposed on almost all floors, blackened by metallurgical activity. Furthermore, the finds of bronze and metal objects have led to the hypothesis that in this workshop objects were not produced from scratch, but re-used antiques from Etruscan tombs and from public and private Roman buildings. Towards the end of the 4th century the workshop and what remained of the domus were abandoned and in the course of the 6th century witnessed burials of infants above the level of collapse.

=== Headquarters of the Augustales ===
On the southern part of the site, close to the mosaics of the domus, are the archaeological remains of the ancient Roman headquarters of the Augustales (an Augusteum), which was built in the imperial period (1st century AD). This was transformed in the early Middle Ages into a Christian church dedicated to St. Sylvester from 765.

=== The Thermal Baths ===
On the north slopes of the hill the thermal complex of the Roman period is characterised by walls of opus reticulatum. The structure is divided into two sectors; the first area covers the northern section, almost rectangular the long sides facing east-west and centred on a bath while the second is characterised by a highly irregular plan in which there is a room with two niches accessed via a double staircase, a large room with an apse in the southwestern corner and another larger room, immediately to the east. A complex system of canals and tunnels with elaborate brick arches indicates the thermal use of the rooms. The characteristics of the opus mixtum used for the structures (with the toothing of brickwork) suggests a date between the last quarter of the 1st century AD and the first quarter of the next.

=== House of the Impluvium ===
The House of the Impluvium is an early 4th c. BC example of an Italic house with an atrium whose roof fed the impluvium pool at its centre.

== Gallery ==
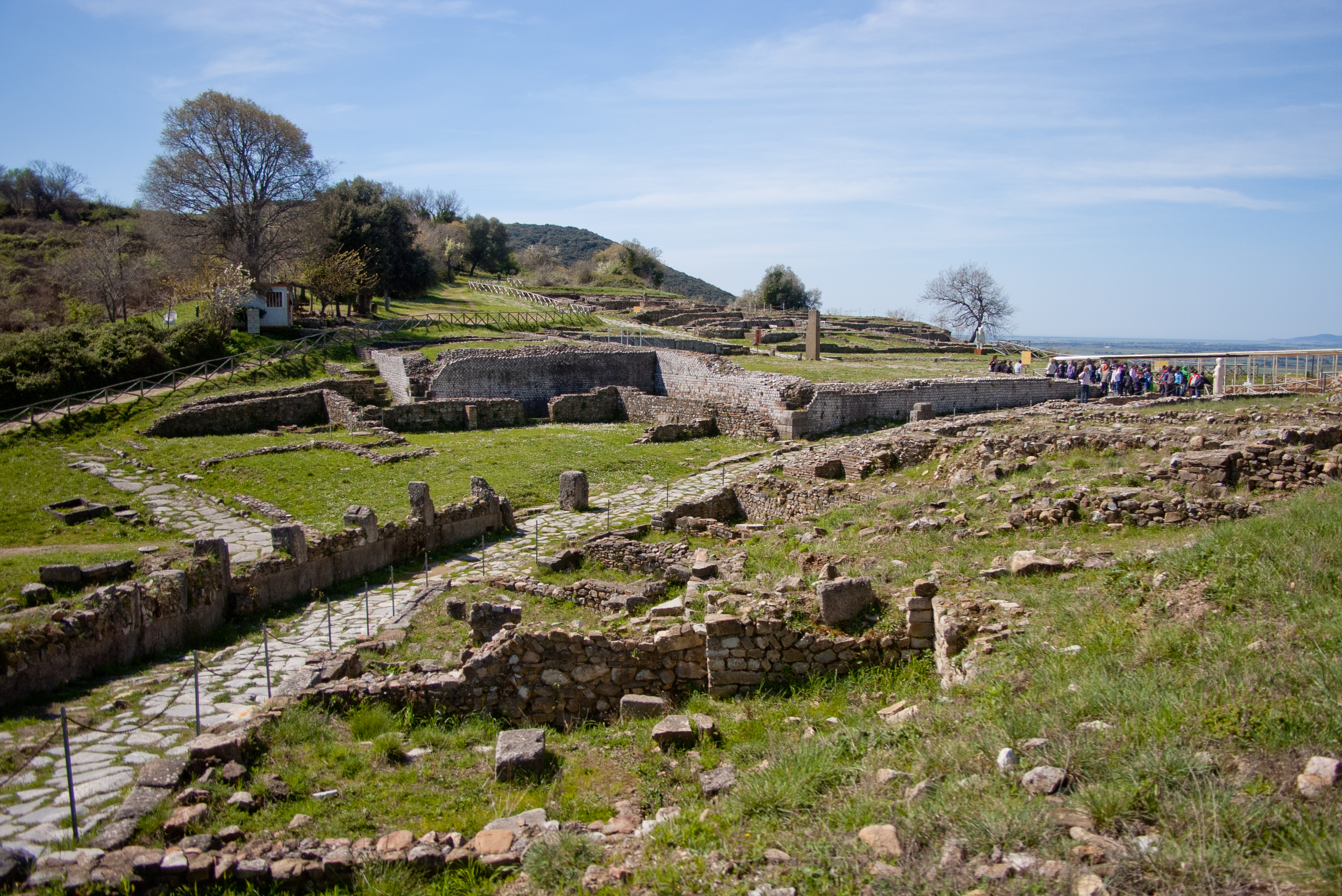
The Archaeological Park of Roselle

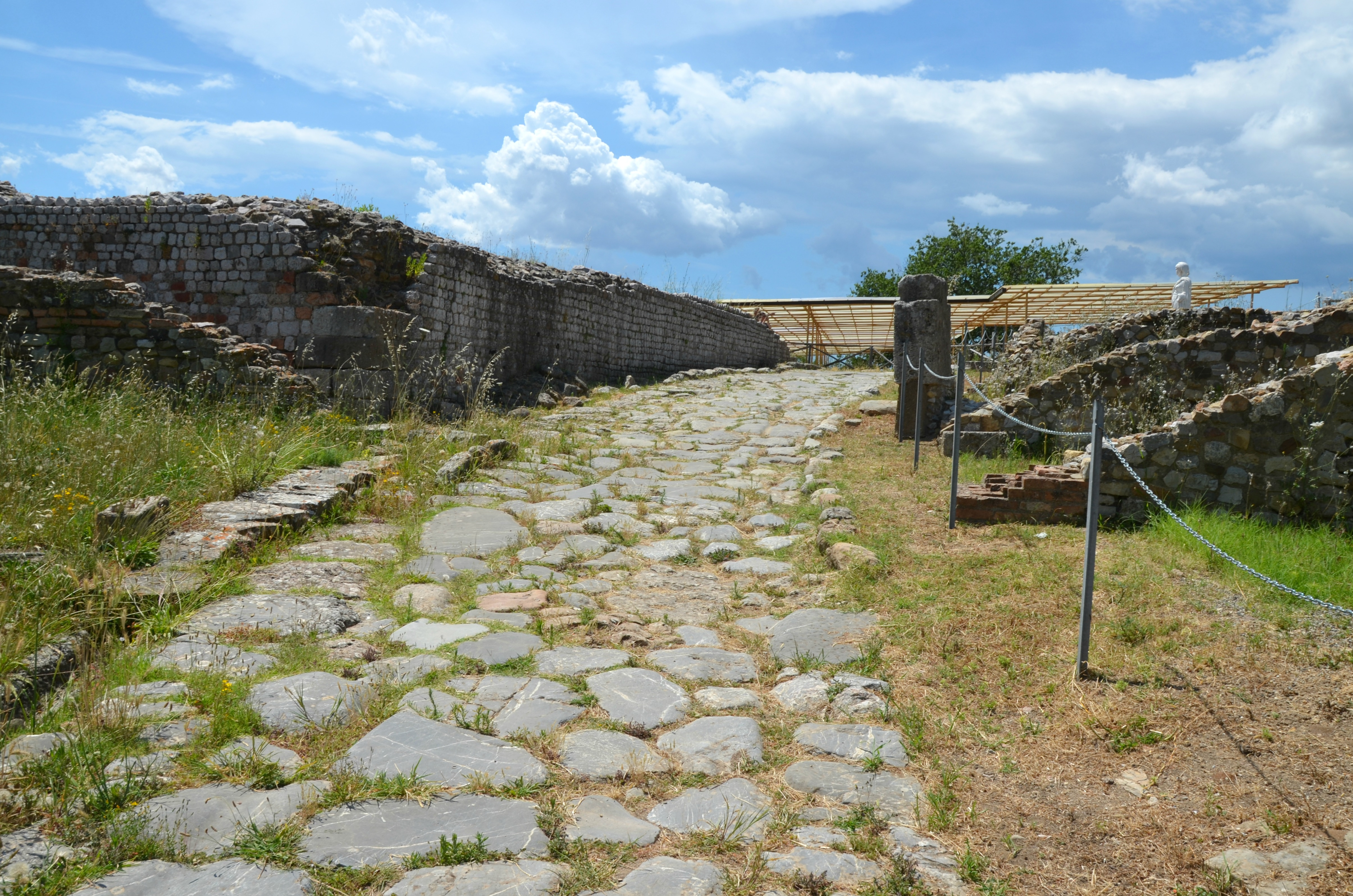
The paved road

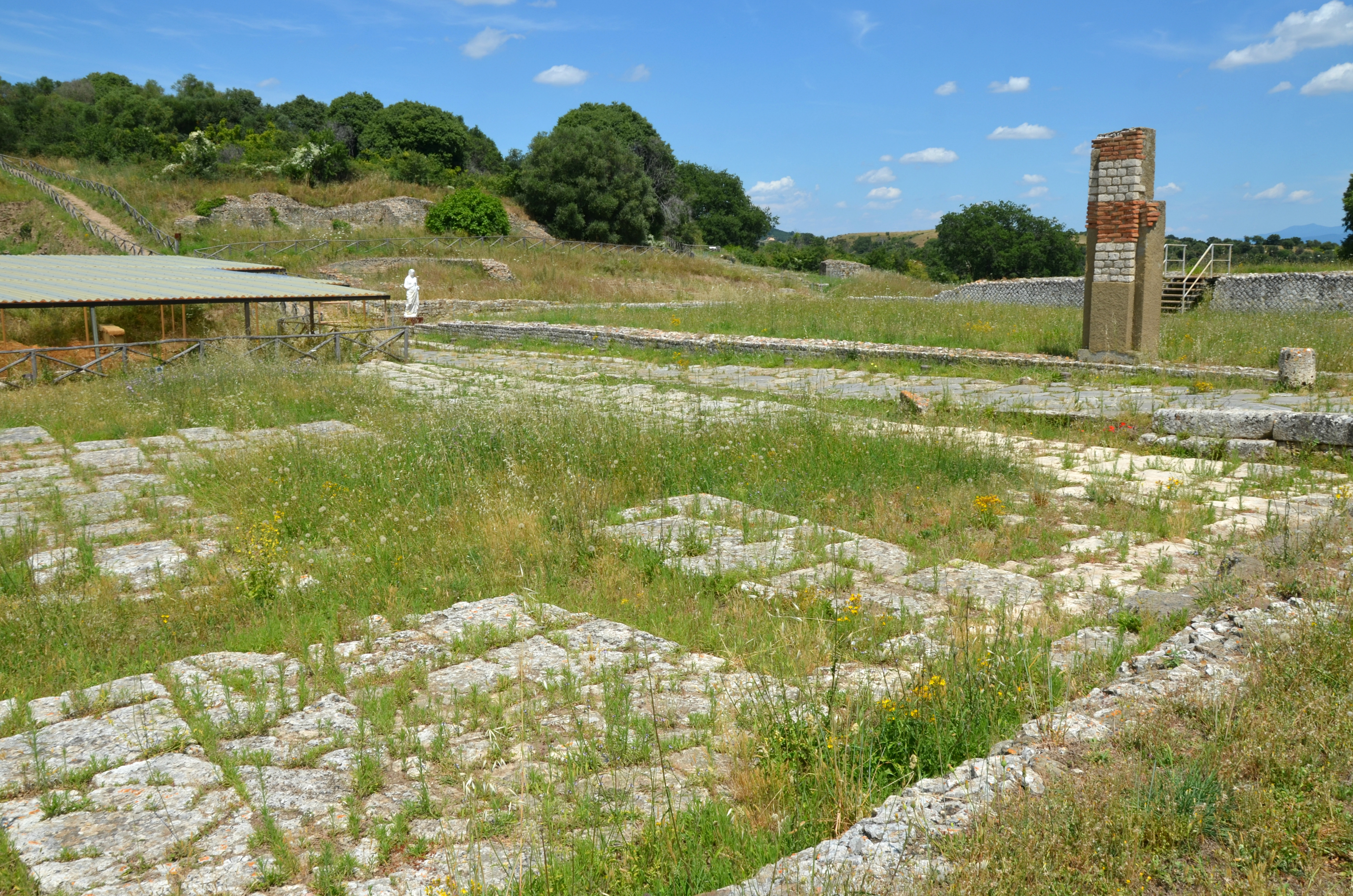
The Roman forum

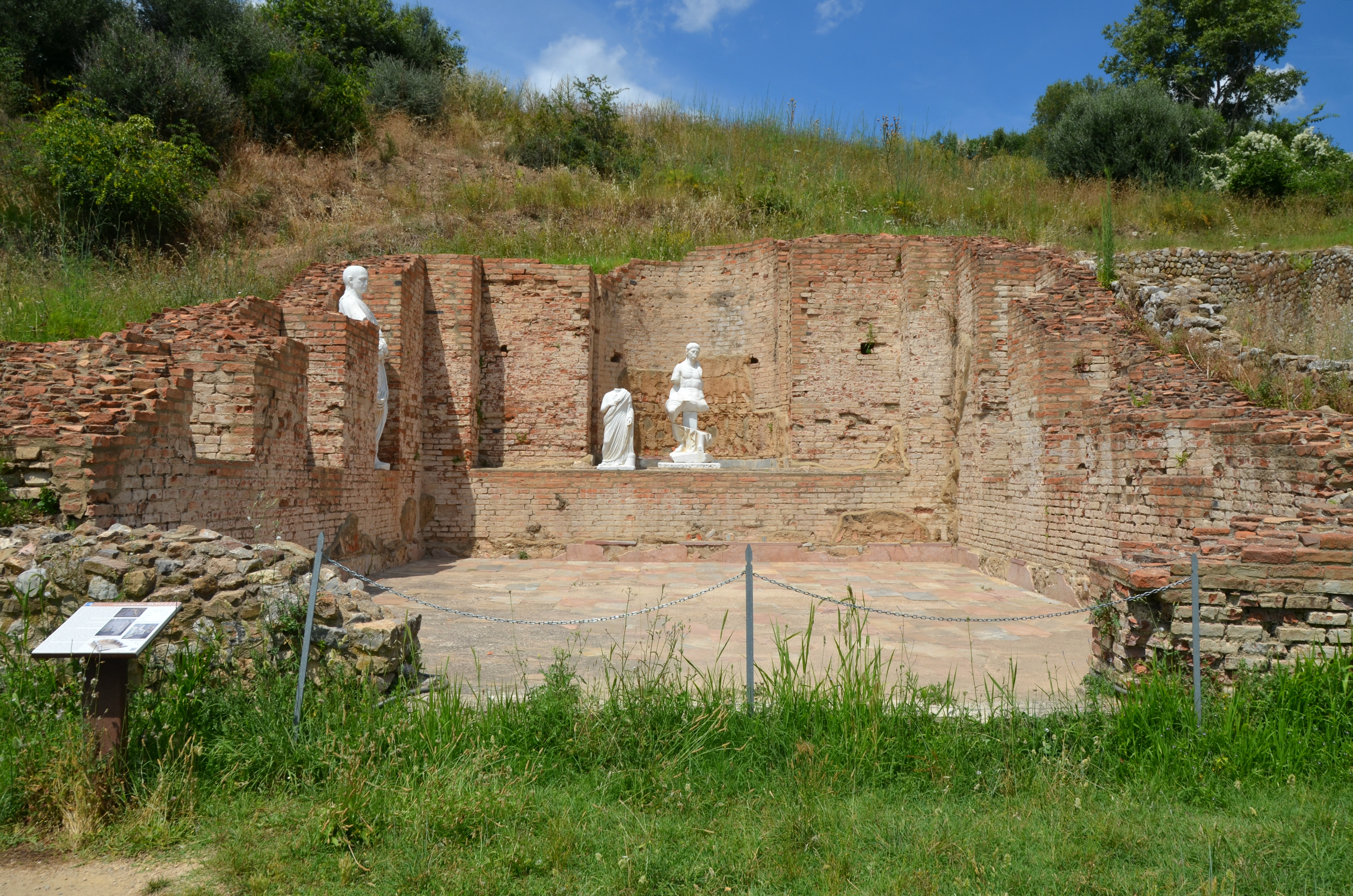
Building D in the Northern area of the Forum

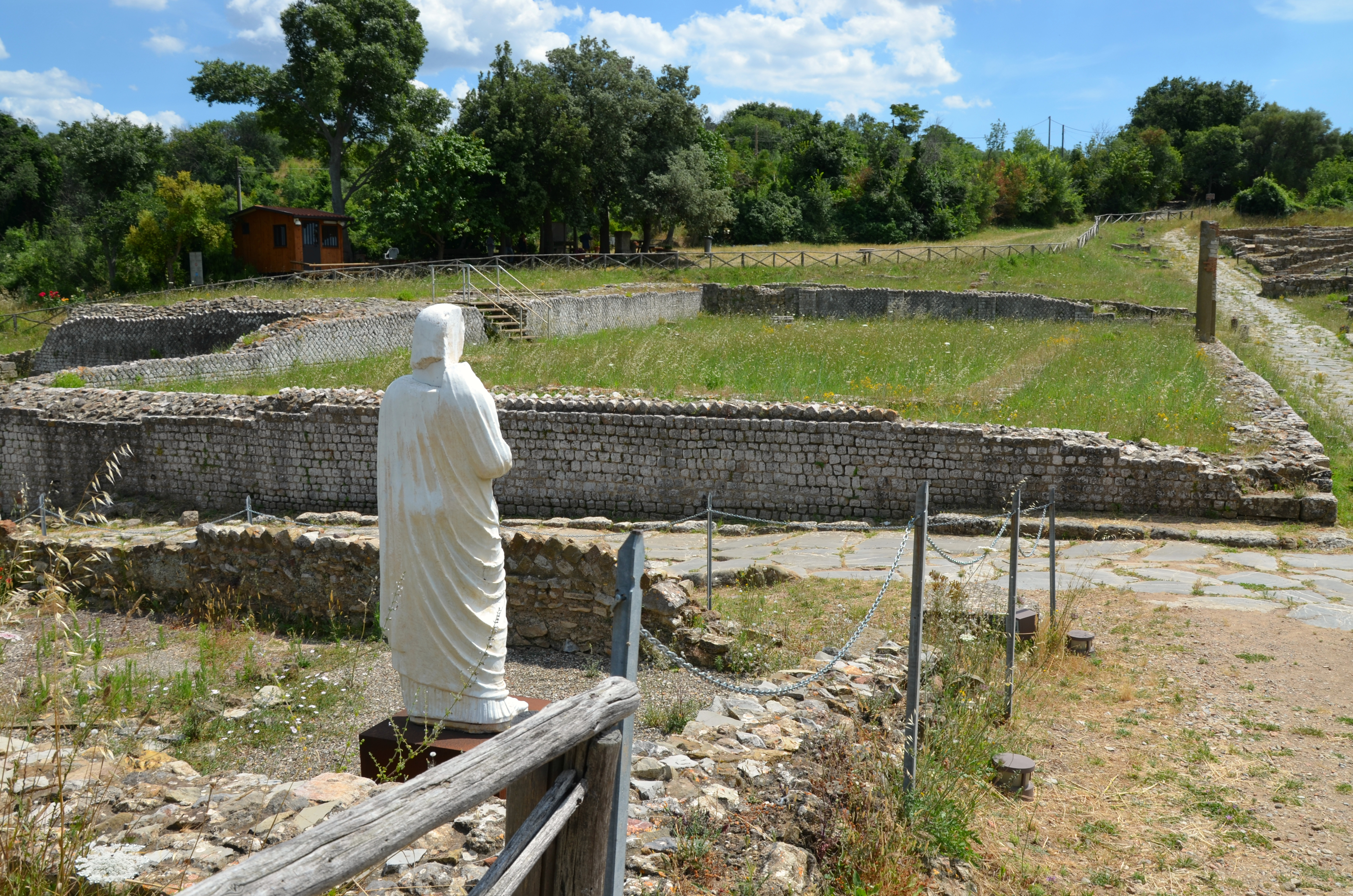
The Basilica

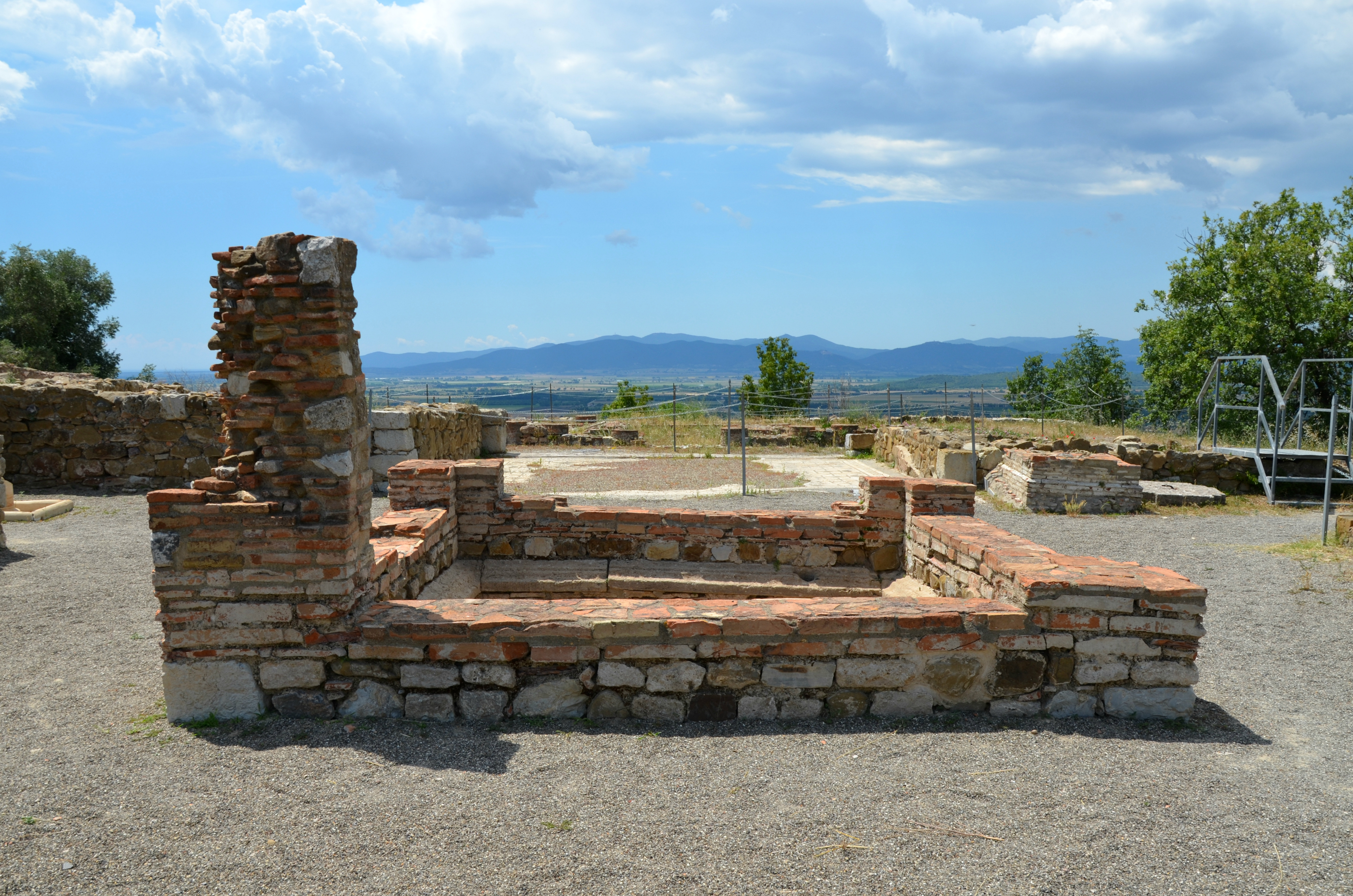
The atrium of the House of the Mosaics

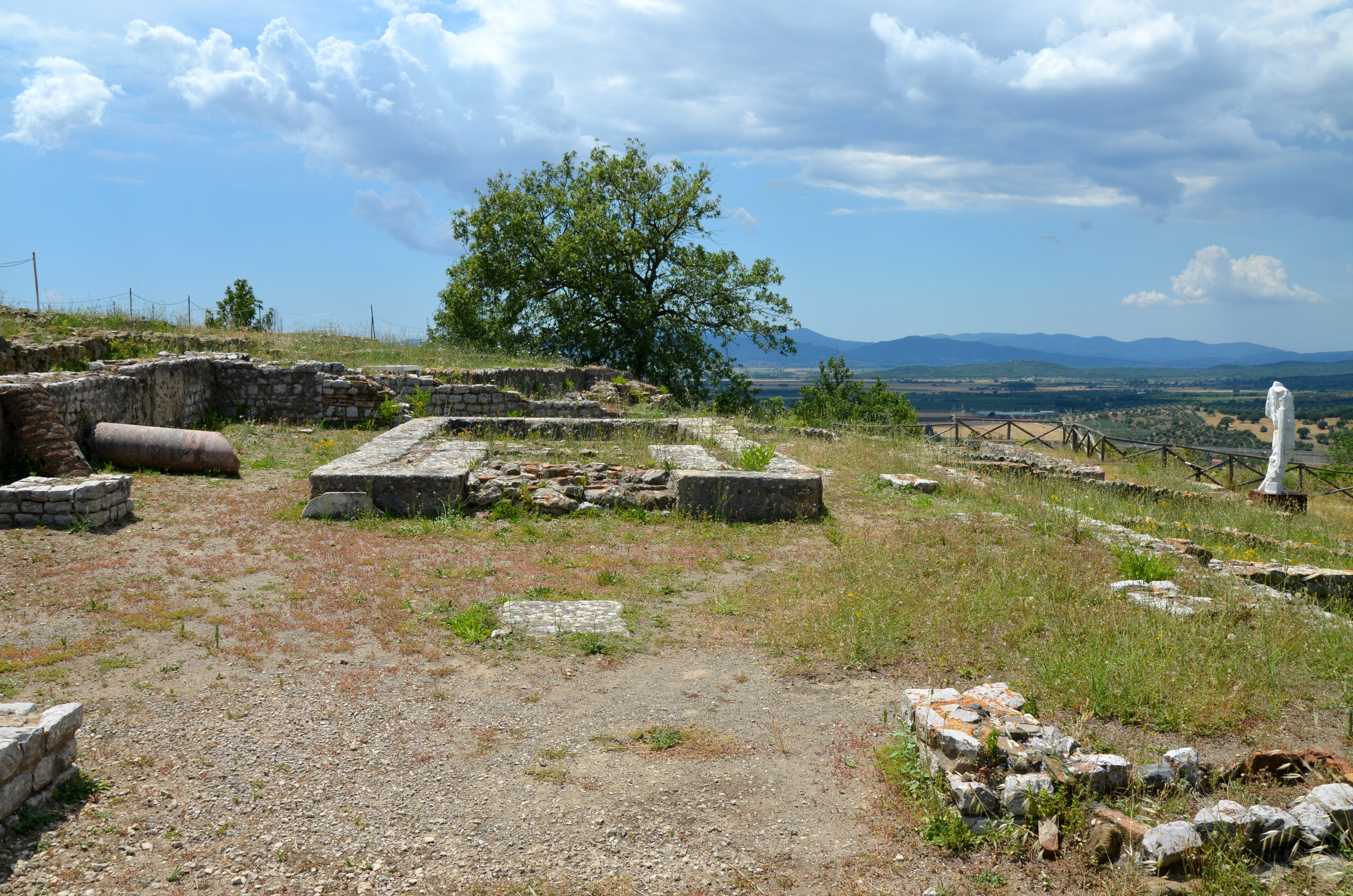
The Italic temple

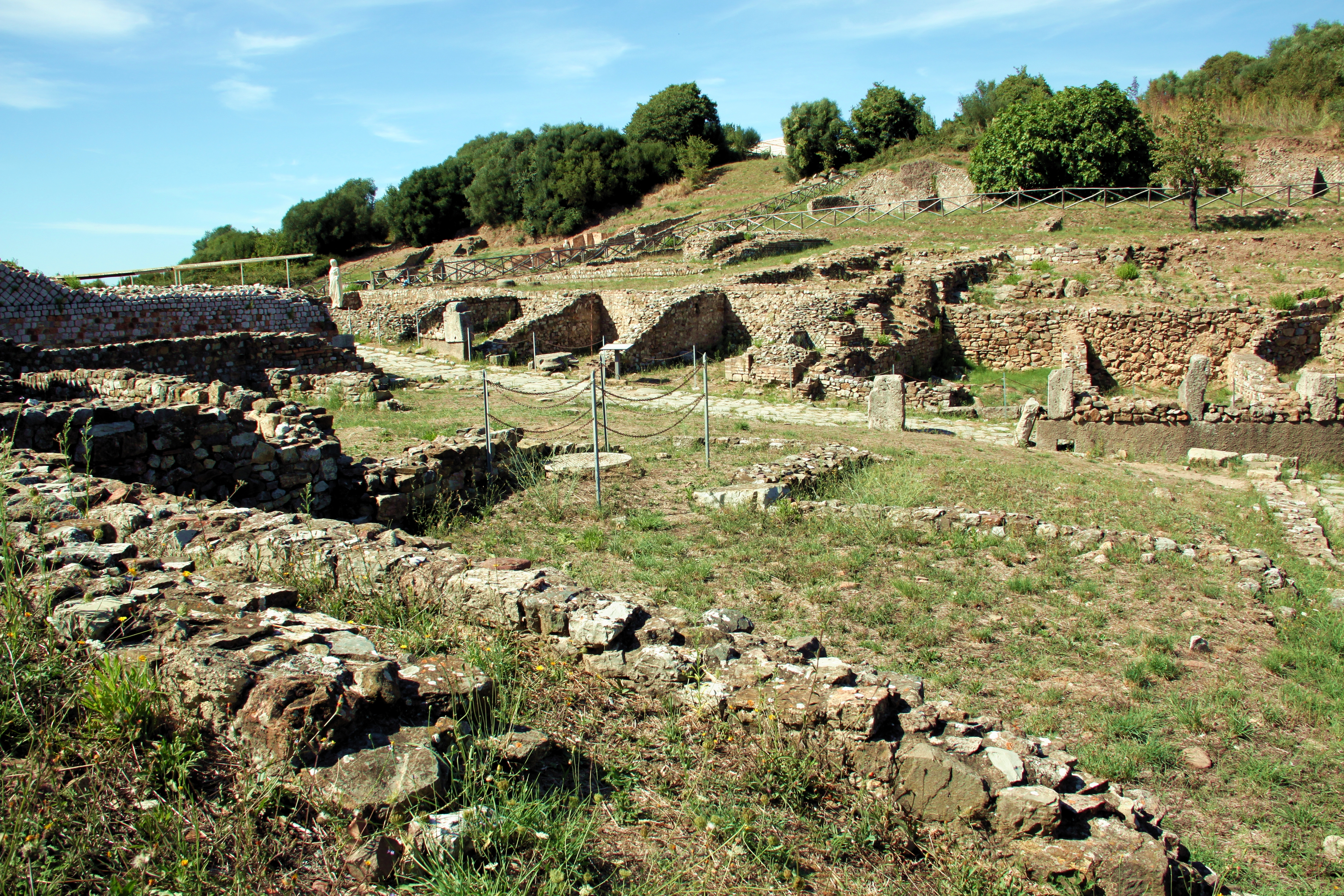
Shops

== Sources and external links ==
- GCatholic - historical and titular bishopric of Roselle
- Rusellae at LacusCurtius
