= Principina Terra =

- Frazione
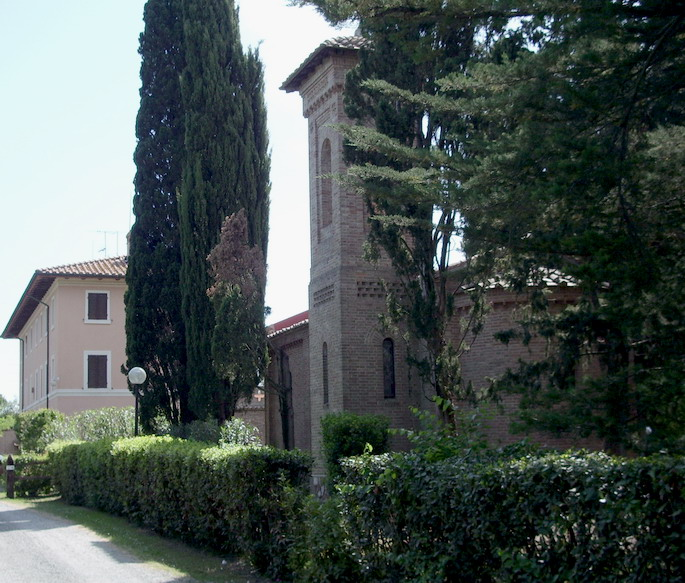
- View of the Principina Farm with its chapel

- Location of Principina Terra in Italy
- Coordinates: 42°44′17″N 11°03′25″E
- Country: Italy
- Region: Tuscany
- Province: Grosseto (GR)
- Comune: Grosseto
- Elevation: 5 m (16 ft)

Population (2010)
  - Total: 317
- Demonym: Principinesi
- Time zone: UTC+1 (CET)
  - Summer (DST): UTC+2 (CEST)
- Postal code: 58100
- Dialing code: 0564

Principina Terra (Italian: [printʃiˈpiːna ˈtɛrra]) is a village in southern Tuscany, a frazione of the comune of Grosseto.

== Overview ==
The frazione is situated south-east of the capital, nearly halfway between the residential centre and the coastal localities of Marina di Grosseto and Principina a Mare. The residential area developed during the last century in the area in which the Principina Farm and its relative chapel, the Church of San Carlo Borromeo, elevated to parish in the 1960s, were already arising. The area in which the residential area stands was encircled by the banks of what used to be Lake Prile, which almost completely disappeared due to reclamation work done in the 18th century by the Lorena family: the waters of the old lake basin were channelled into various drains which coast the residential area crossing one another in multiple points in the nearby plains.

== Main sights ==
- Fattoria di Principina (Principina Farm), an old farm which also gave its name to the nearby hotel complex. It is positioned along the road which joins Grosseto to Marina di Grosseto, in proximity to the crossing with the road which leads to the hotel.
- Church of Annunciazione, a chapel situated near the farm, with a bell tower and brick wall-buildings.
- Church of San Carlo Borromeo, modern parish of the village, built in 2009.

== Bibliography ==
- Marcella Parisi, Grosseto dentro e fuori porta. L'emozione e il pensiero (Associazione Archeologica Maremmana), Siena, C&P Adver Effigi, 2001.

== See also ==
- Grosseto
- Maremma
- Alberese
- Batignano
- Braccagni
- Istia d'Ombrone
- Marina di Grosseto
- Montepescali
- Principina a Mare
- Rispescia
- Roselle, Italy
