= Principina a Mare =

- Frazione
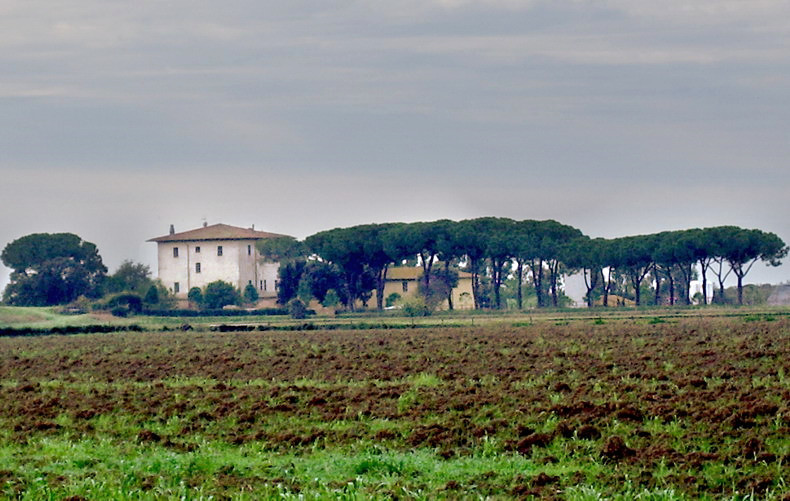
- View of the Tower of Trappola

- Location of Principina a Mare in Italy
- Coordinates: 42°41′53″N 11°00′14″E
- Country: Italy
- Region: Tuscany
- Province: Grosseto (GR)
- Comune: Grosseto
- Elevation: 3 m (9.8 ft)

Population (2010)
  - Total: 262
- Demonym: Principinesi
- Time zone: UTC+1 (CET)
  - Summer (DST): UTC+2 (CEST)
- Postal code: 58100
- Dialing code: 0564

Principina a Mare (Italian: [printʃiˈpiːna a mˈmaːre]) is an Italian frazione of the comune of Grosseto, in the province of the same name.

== Overview ==
The centre, less populated during winter, is mainly made up of houses of holidaymakers, hotels and a campsite. It is frequented due to its closeness to the mouth of the Ombrone river and to the Natural Park of Maremma. The largest number of tourists is registered in the months of July and August, the highest peaks being in the weeks around Ferragosto. The main touristic flux comes from the northern regions, such as Lombardy and Veneto, asides from centre-eastern Tuscany. Relevant is the presence of overseas tourists, mainly coming from the Netherlands, Austria, Germany and Switzerland; which however choose more the months of June and September.

The coast south of Principina a Mare is characterized by wild beaches, which penetrate into the still marshy territories towards the Ombrone. The Trappola marshland extends around the Tower of Trappola, a medieval fortification put to use for harvesting salt from some salt works now disappeared. Not far away stands the chapel of Santa Maria della Trappola, whilst the Strillaie Chapel has its position on the outside of the marshy area, inside a farm situated in proximity to the Principina a Mare crossing.

The marshy area of the Trappola is ideal for birdwatching due to the large number of marshy birds which come to hibernate in this area. Recently a new itinerary P1 has been opened which crosses part of the area positioned inside the borders of the Natural Park of Maremma.

== See also ==
- Alberese
- Batignano
- Braccagni
- Grosseto
- Istia d'Ombrone
- Maremma
- Marina di Grosseto
- Montepescali
- Principina Terra
- Rispescia
- Roselle, Italy

== Sources ==
- Marcella Parisi, Grosseto dentro e fuori porta. L'emozione e il pensiero (Associazione Archeologica Maremmana), Siena, C&P Adver Effigi, 2001.
