= List of canals in Italy =

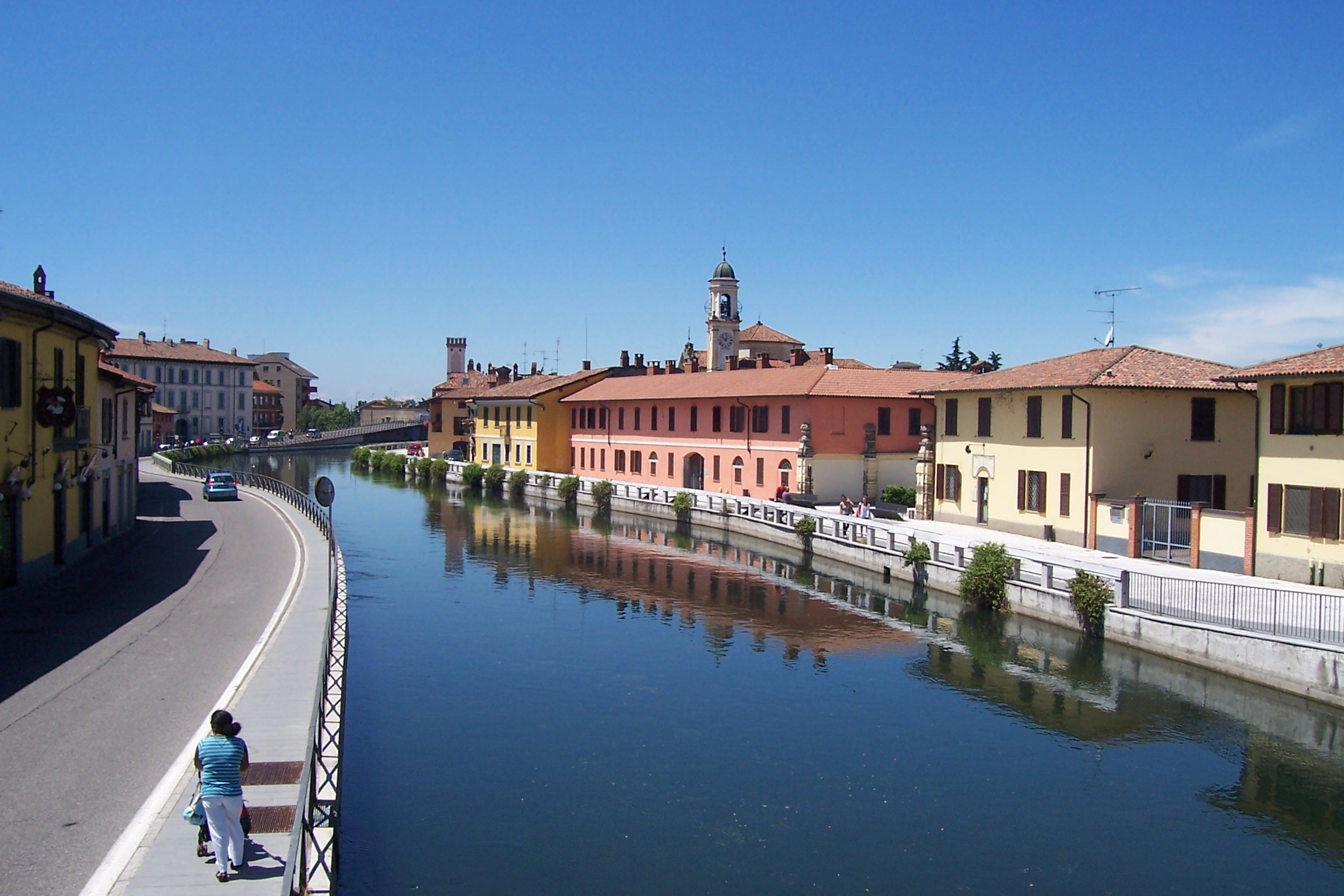
Naviglio Grande

This is a list of canals in Italy. The canals are listed here in alphabetic order of the name.

== Canals in Italy ==
=== A ===
- Acquara
- Alicorno
- Allacciante Circondario
- Armedola

=== B ===
- Barbaresca (canal)

=== C ===
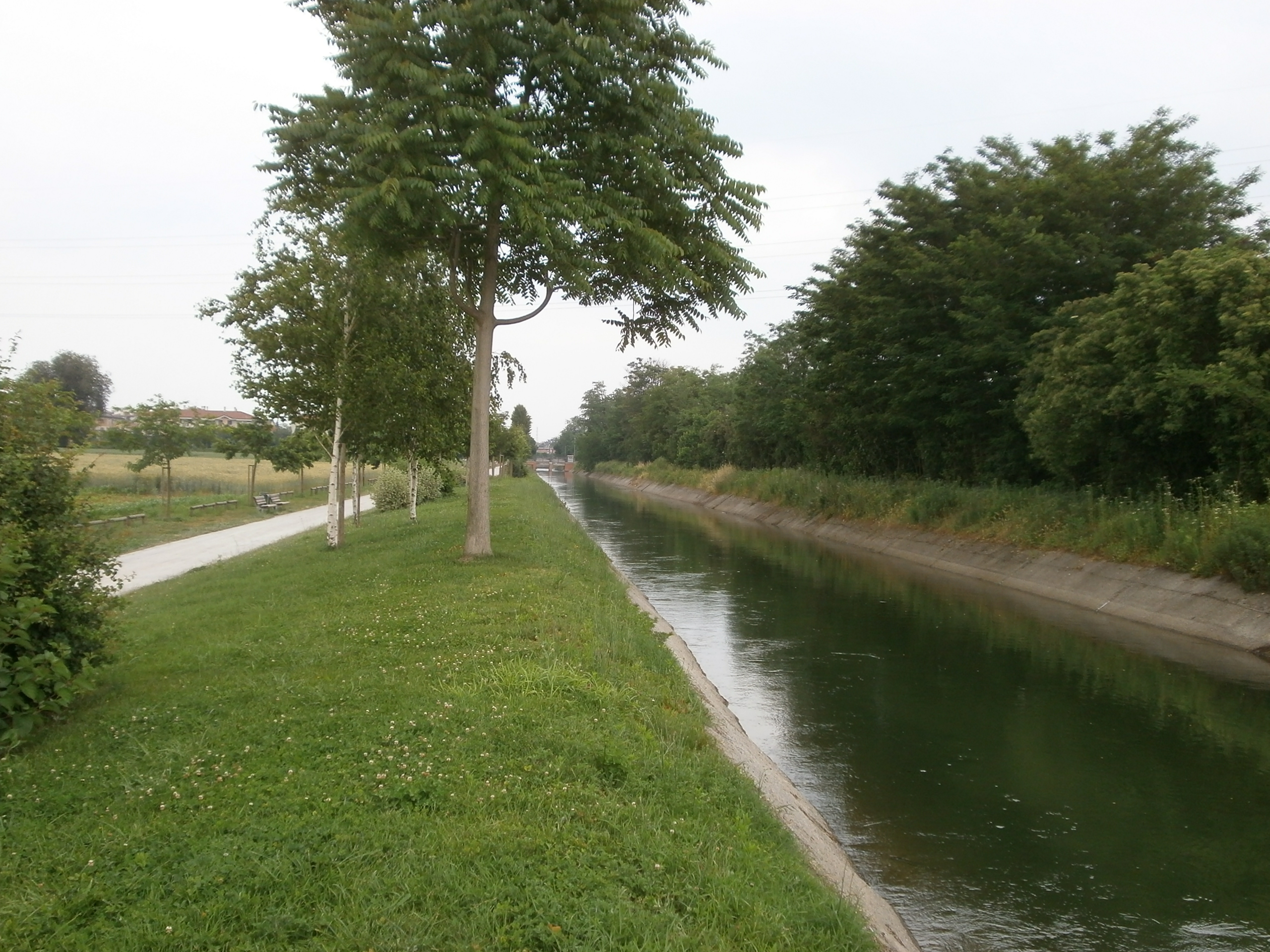
Canale Villoresi

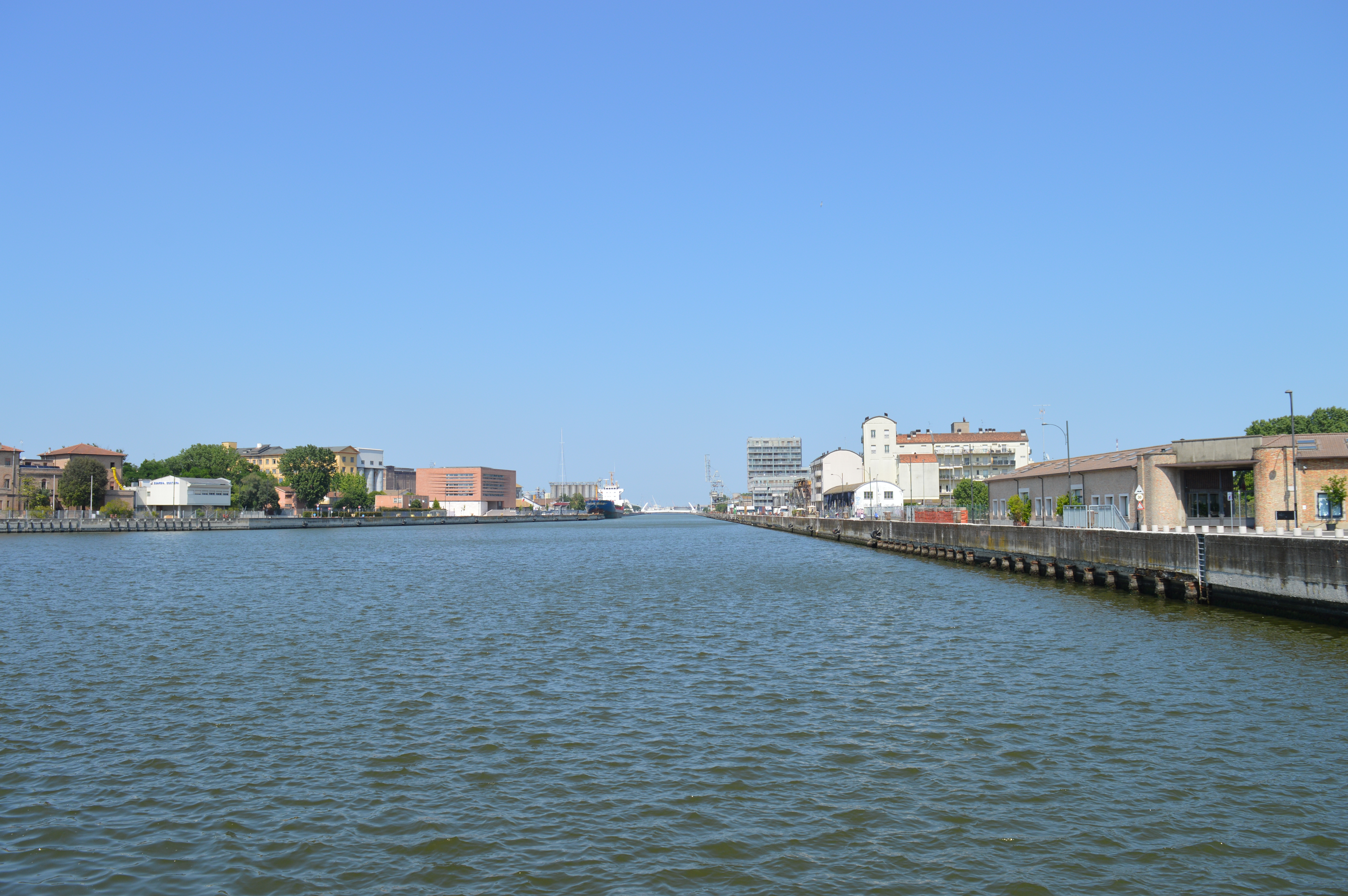
Canale Candiano

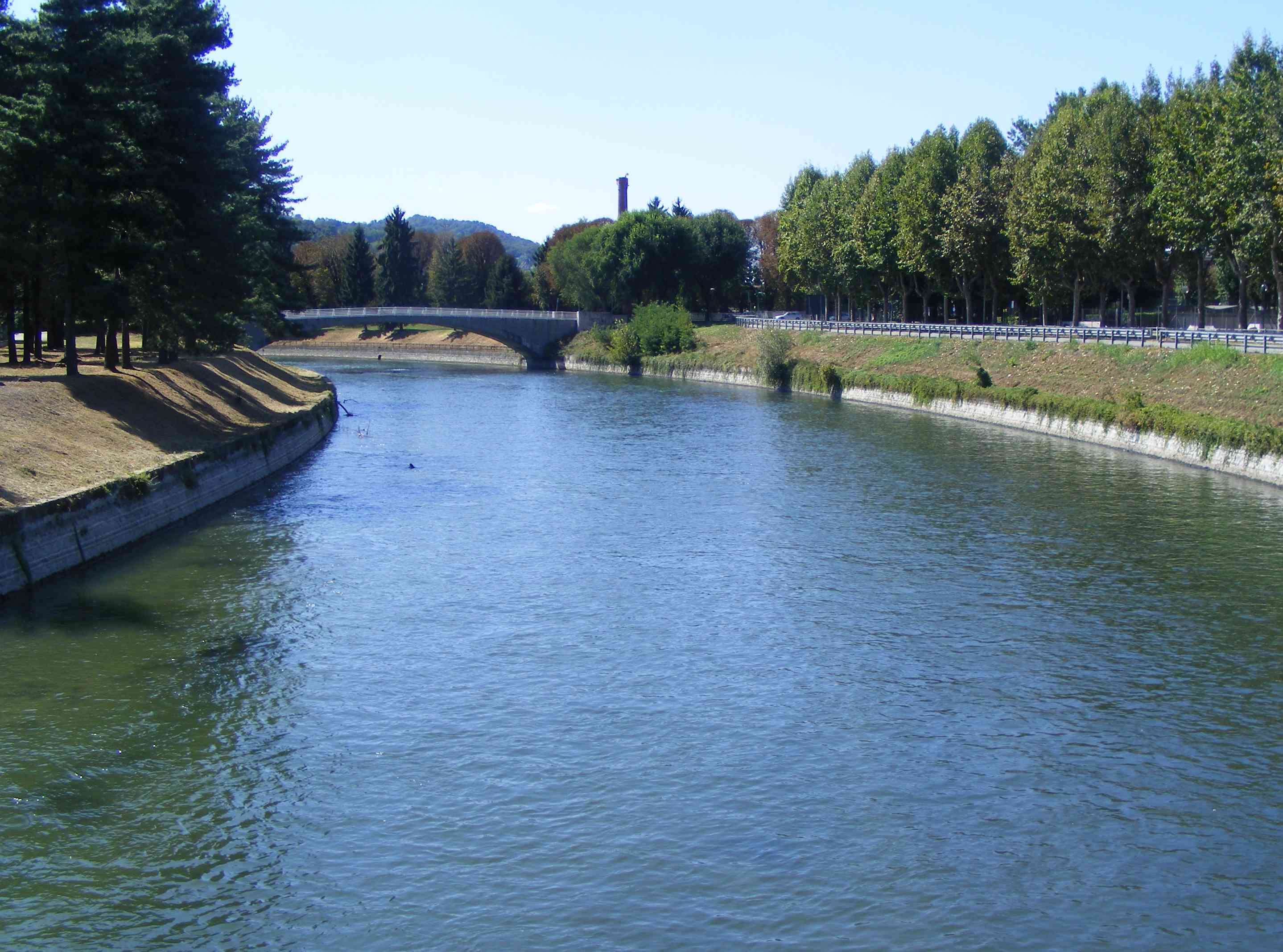
Canale Cavour

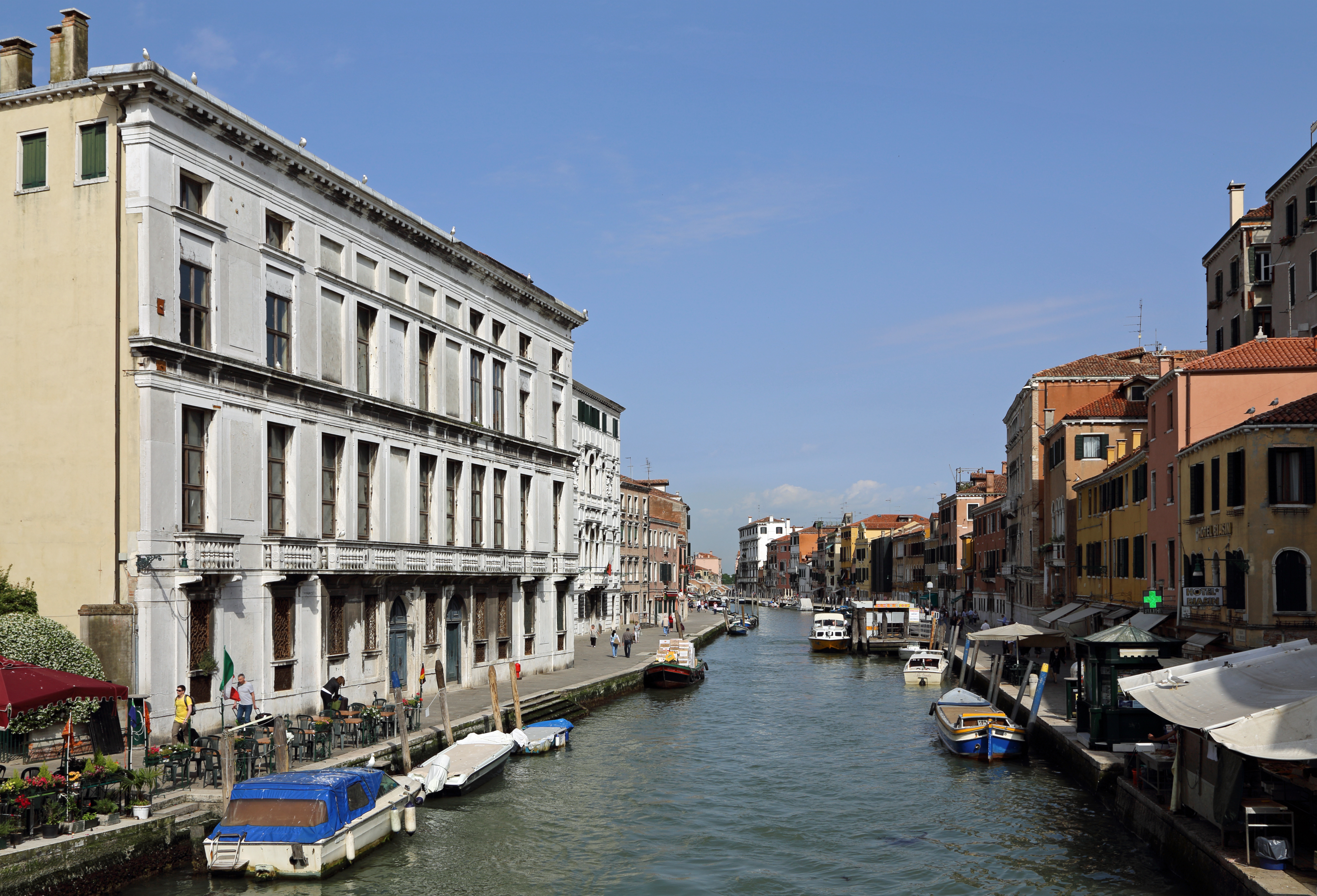
Cannaregio Canal

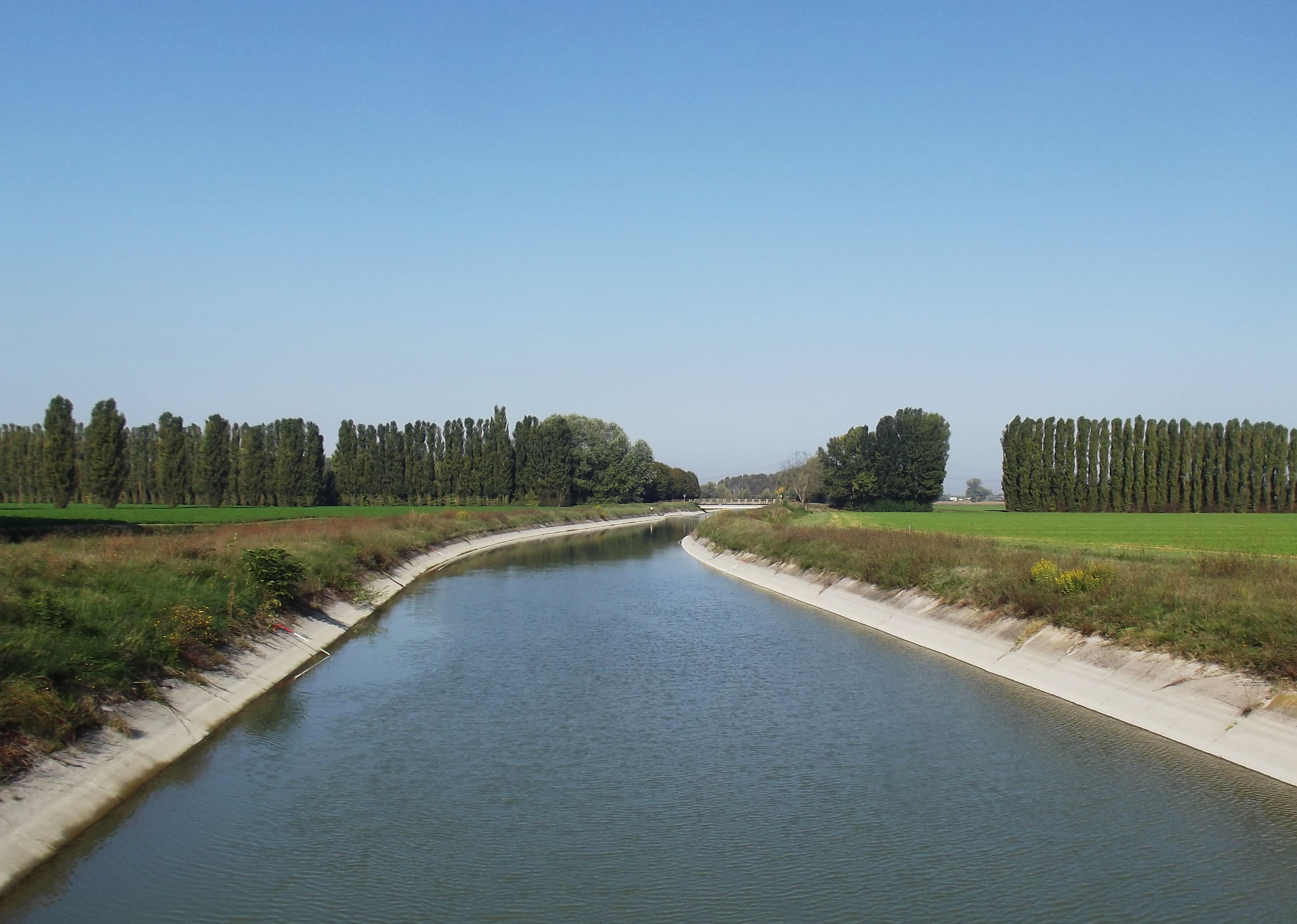
Canale Emiliano Romagnolo

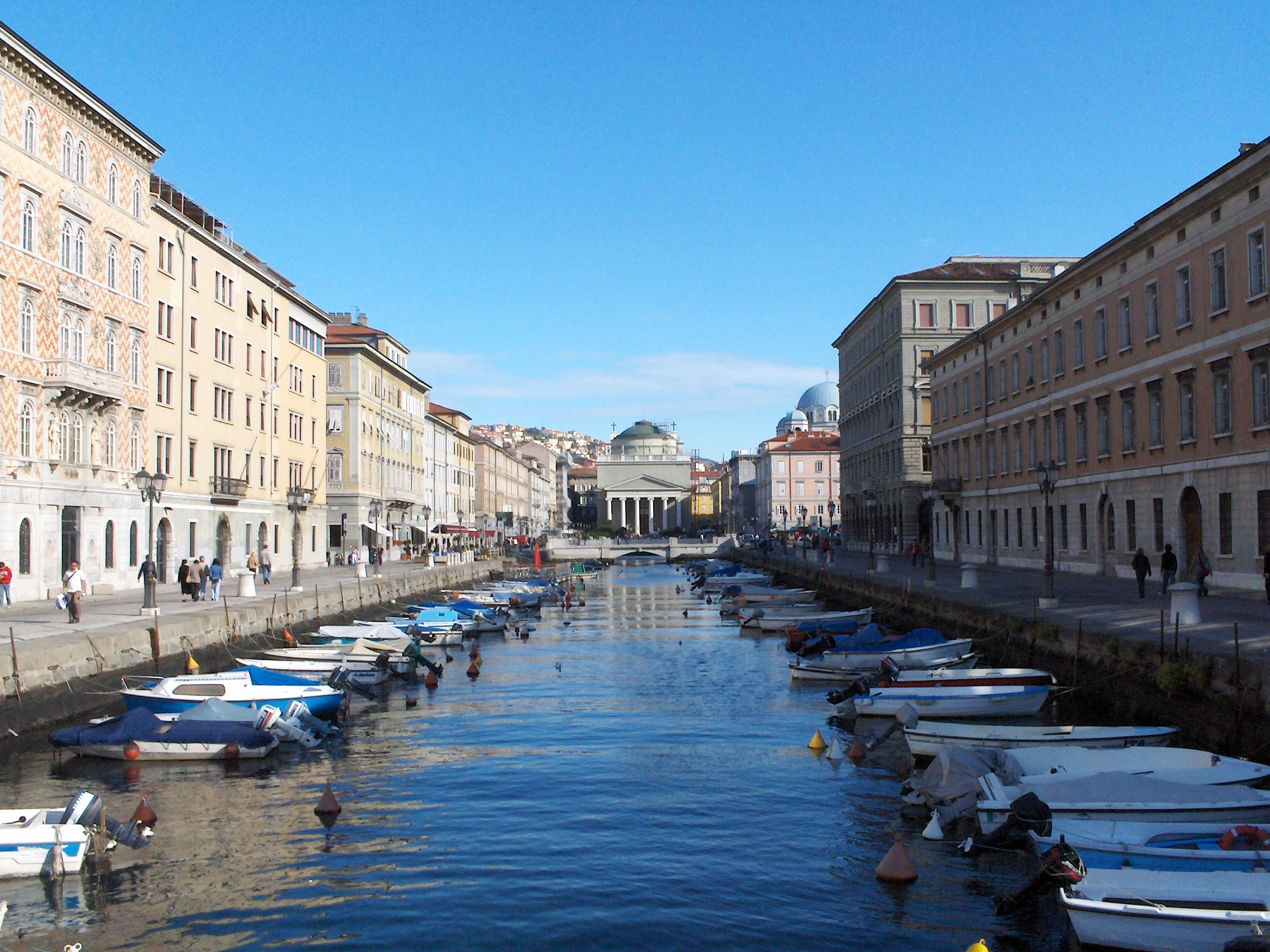
Canal Grande

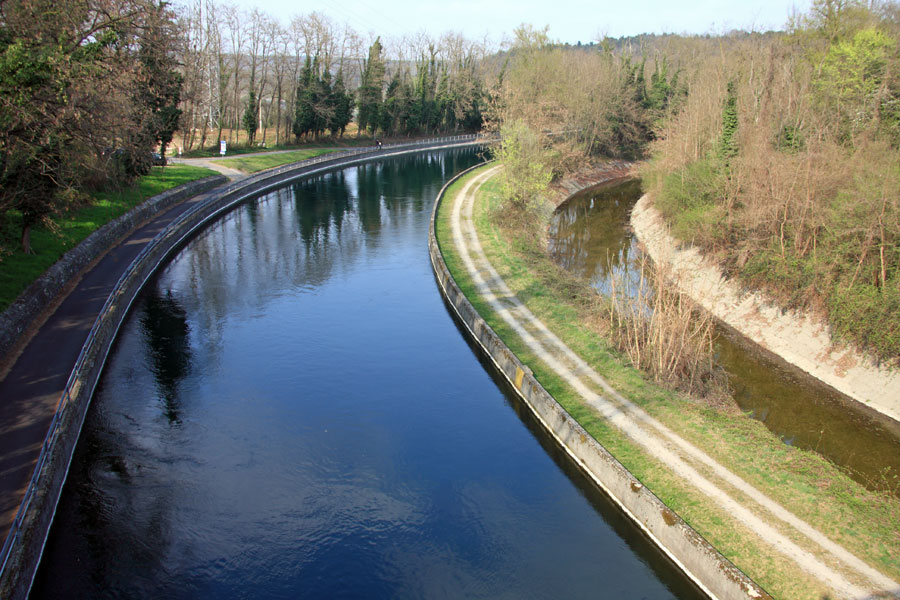
Canale Industriale

- Canal Grande
- Canal Salso
- Canalazzo Terrieri
- Canale Albani
- Canale Anfora
- Canale Arnò
- Canale Battaglia
- Canale Biffis
- Canale Bisatto
- Canale Bottaro
- Canale Brentella
- Canale Burlamacca
- Canale Camuzzoni
- Canale Candiano
- Canale Carlo Alberto
- Canale Cavour
- Canale Ciappetta-Camaggio
- Canale Conte di Sarno
- Canale Depretis
- Canale della Botte
- Canale dei molini di Imola
- Canale di Burana
- Canale di Medicina
- Canale di Ravaldino
- Canale di San Gottardo
- Canale diversivo dell'Ombrone
- Canale Edison
- Canale Emiliano Romagnolo
- Canale emissario del Lago di Burano
- Canale emissario di San Leopoldo
- Canale emissario di San Rocco
- Canale in destra di Reno
- Canale Industriale
- Canale Ledra
- Canale Lunense
- Canale maestro della Chiana
- Canale Milano-Cremona-Po
- Canale Quintino Sella
- Canale Regina Elena
- Canale Scolmatore di Nord Ovest
- Canale Vetra
- Canale Villoresi
- Canale Virgilio
- Canali di Bologna
- Cannaregio Canal
- Castellana (canal)
- Cavetta
- Cavo Benedettino
- Cavo Cattedrale
- Cavo Dassi
- Cavo Diotti
- Cavo Lama
- Cavo Monaco
- Cavo Montebello
- Cavo Napoleonico
- Cavo Panizzina
- Cavo Plezza
- Cavo Prina
- Cavo Redefossi
- Cavo Ricca
- Cavo Ticinello
- Ciria (canal)
- Colatore Rimella
- Collettore delle Acque Alte
- Collettore Padano

=== D ===
- Diramatore Alto Novarese
- Diramatore Vigevano
- Diversivo

=== E ===
- Emissario del lago di Nemi

=== F ===
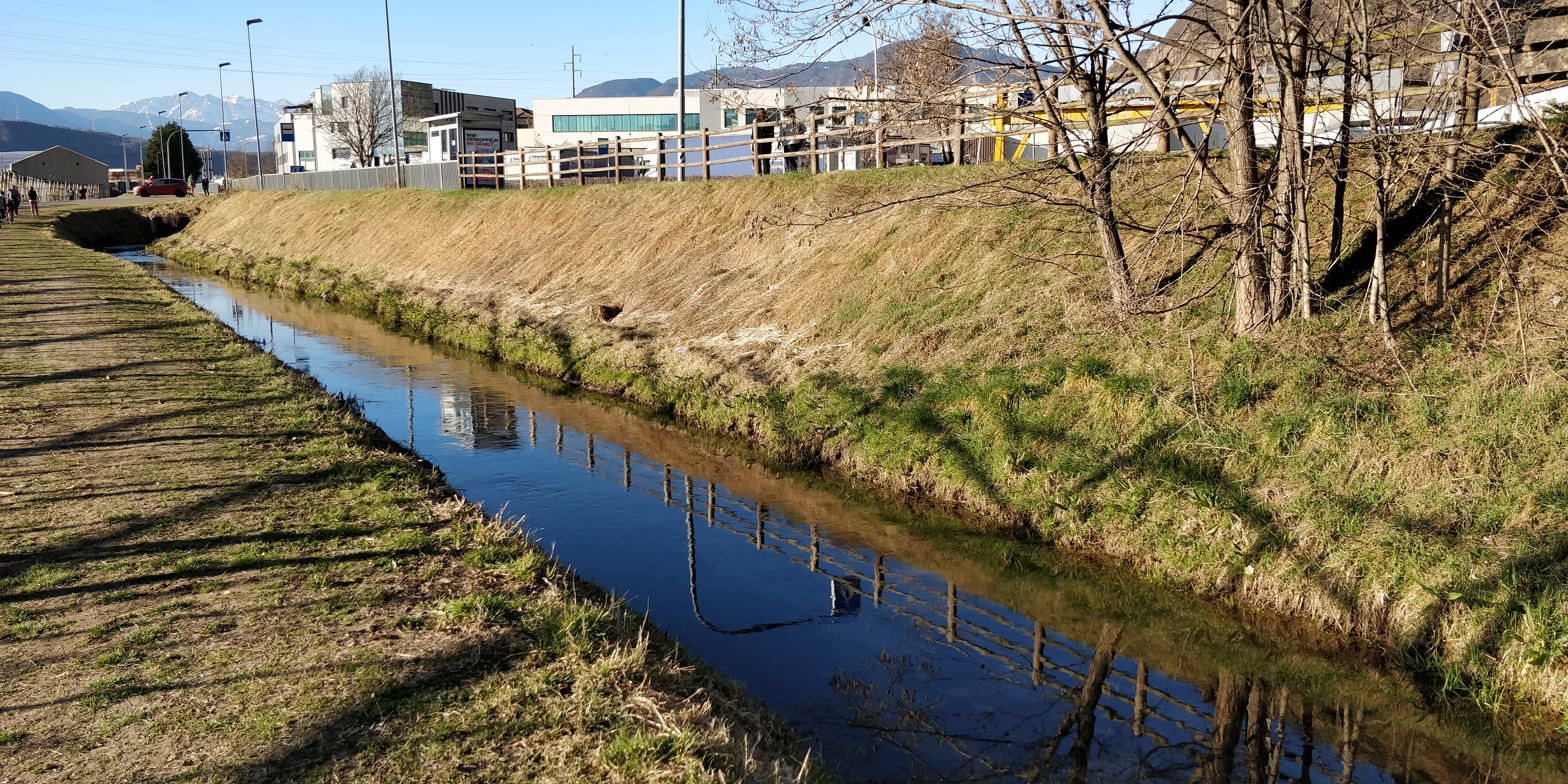
Fosso Landgraben

- Filistina
- Fissero
- Fossa di Bronzolo
- Fossa di Laives
- Fossa Grande di Caldaro
- Fossa Piccola di Caldaro
- Fossa Porzen
- Fossatone
- Fosso Beveraggio
- Fosso del Mulino
- Fosso delle Bocchette
- Fosso Landgraben
- Fosso Macinante
- Fosso Reale (Campi Bisenzio)
- Fosso Reale (Livorno)
- Fosso Reale (Pisa)
- Fumolenta

=== G ===
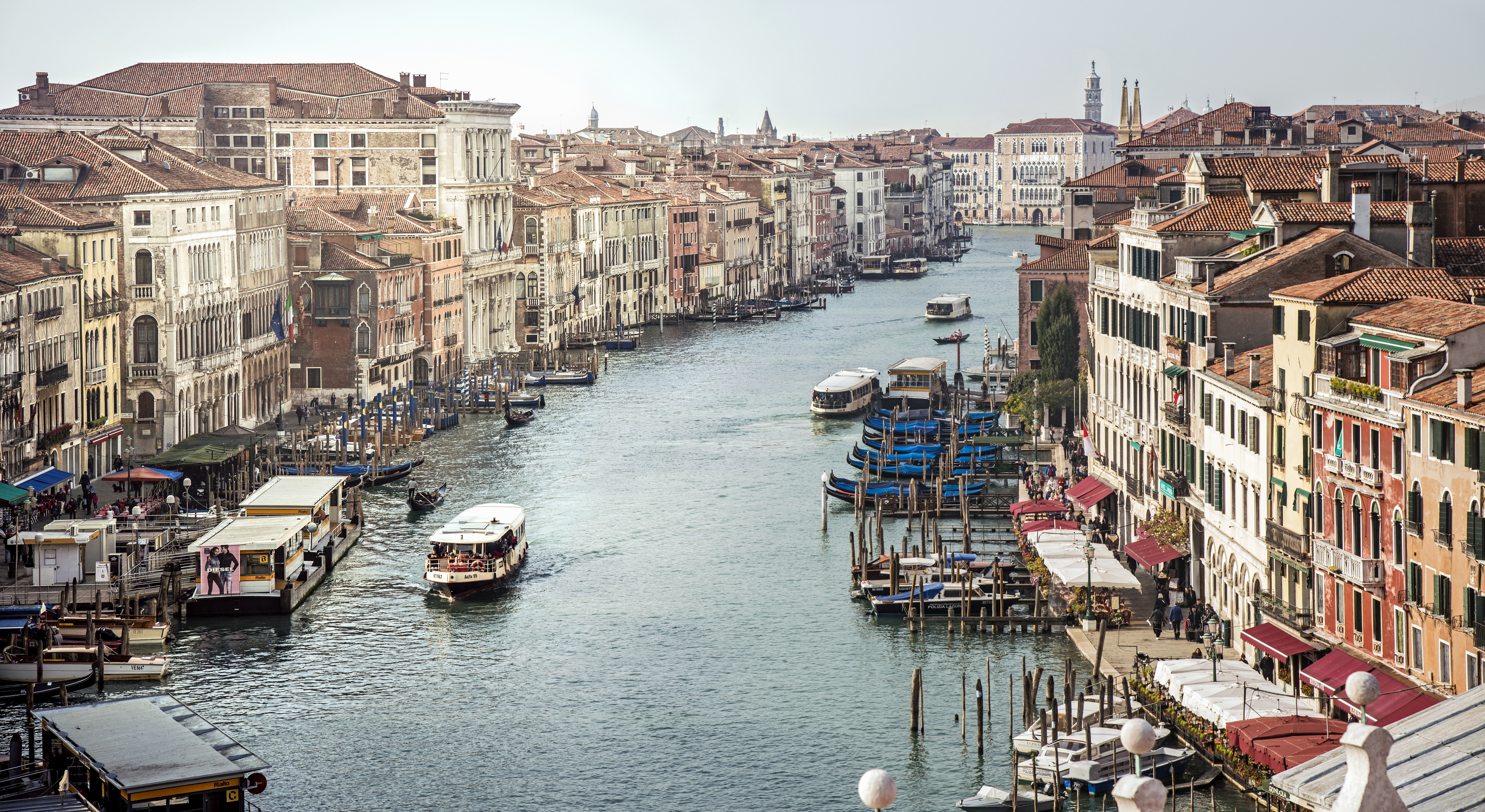
Grand Canal

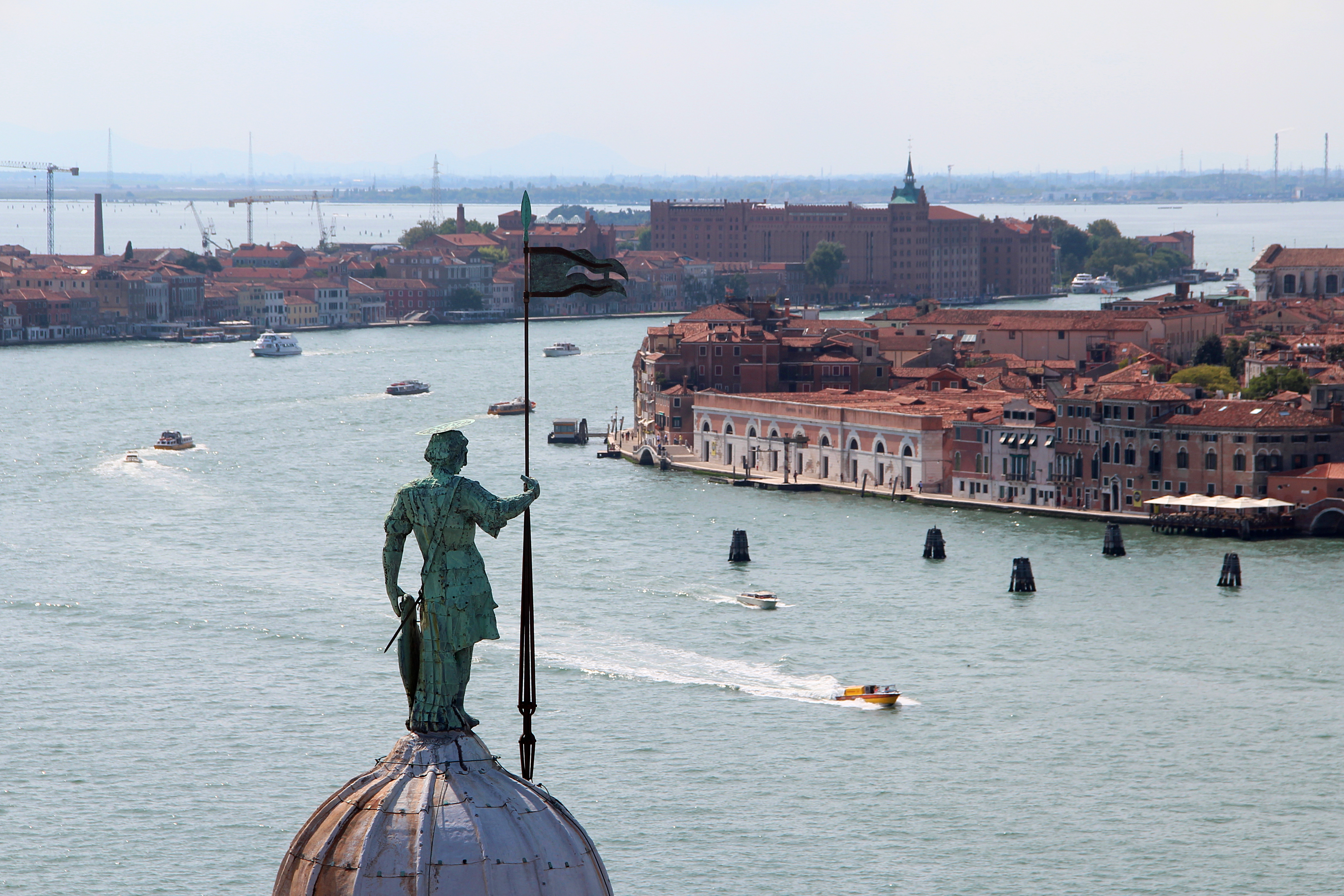
Giudecca Canal

- Galleria Adige-Garda
- Gambalone
- Garda (canal)
- Giudecca Canal
- Gora Molinara
- Gore di Colle di Val d'Elsa
- Gorile
- Gorzone (canal)
- Gran Pertus
- Grand Canal

=== I ===
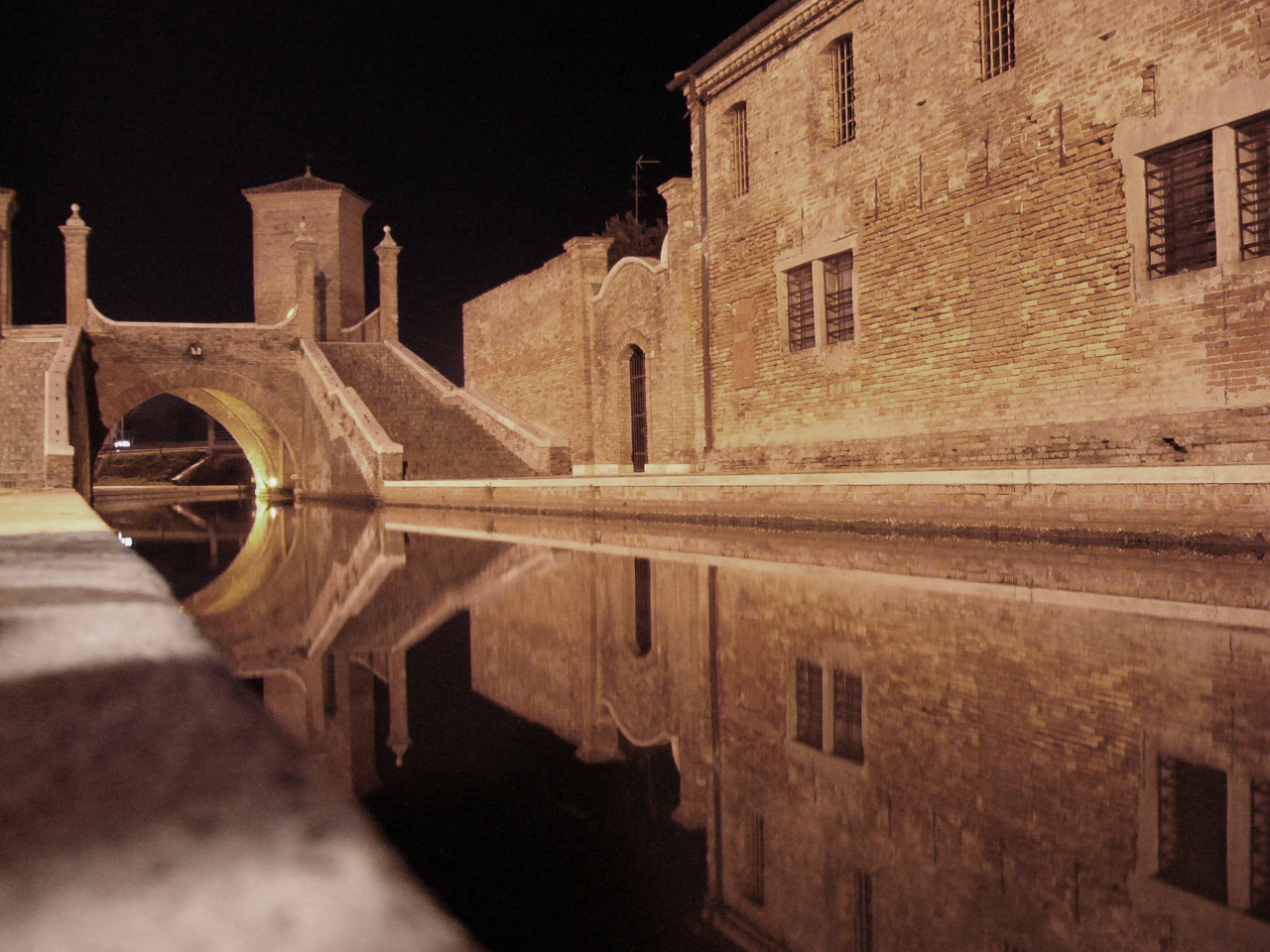
Idrovia Ferrarese

- Idrovia Ferrarese
- Idrovia Litoranea Veneta
- Idrovia Padova-Venezia

=== L ===
- Lambretto (canal)
- Lorno
- Litoranea Veneta
- Locavaz
- Lorgana

=== M ===
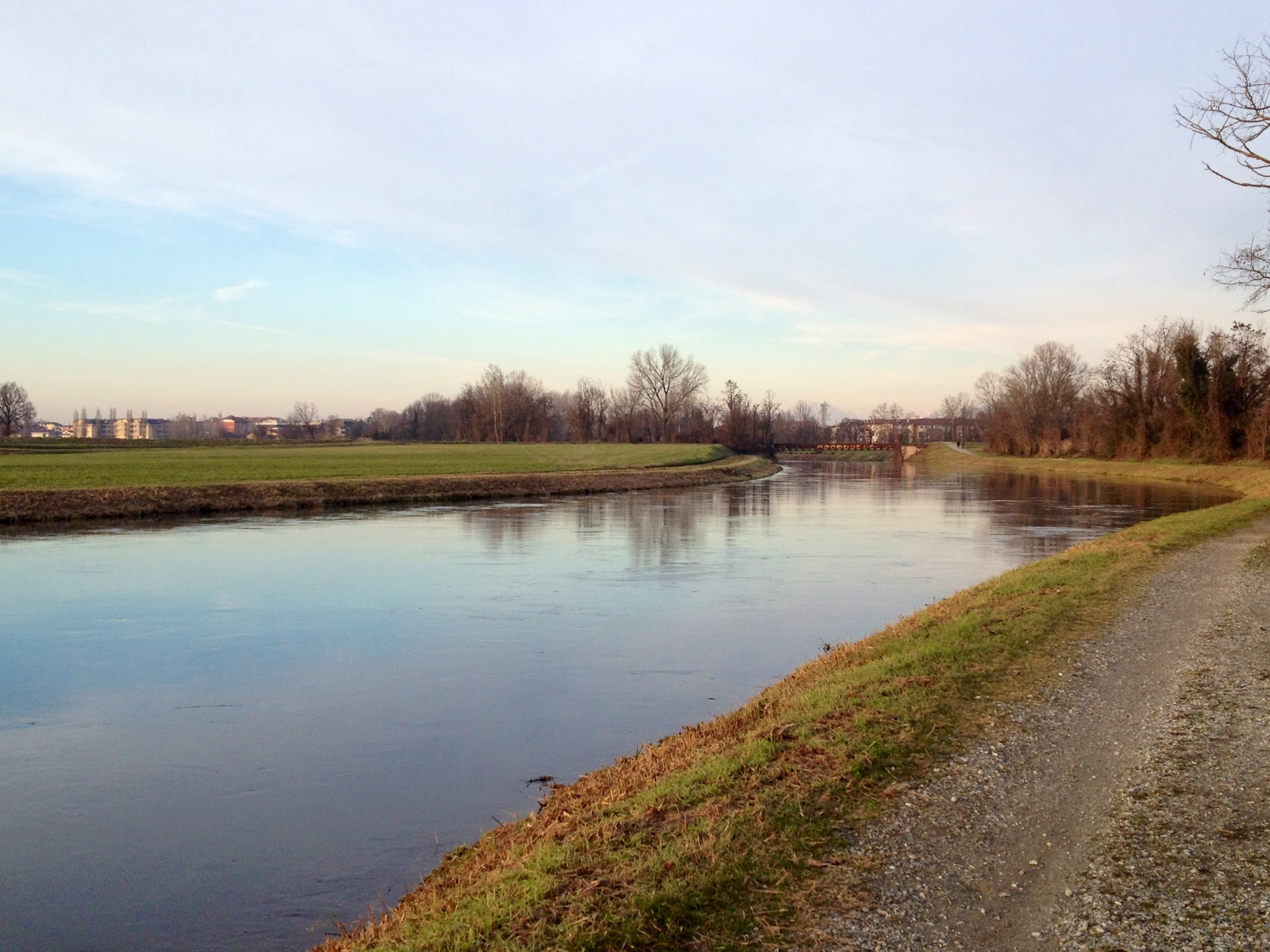
Muzza Canal

- Muzza Canal

=== N ===
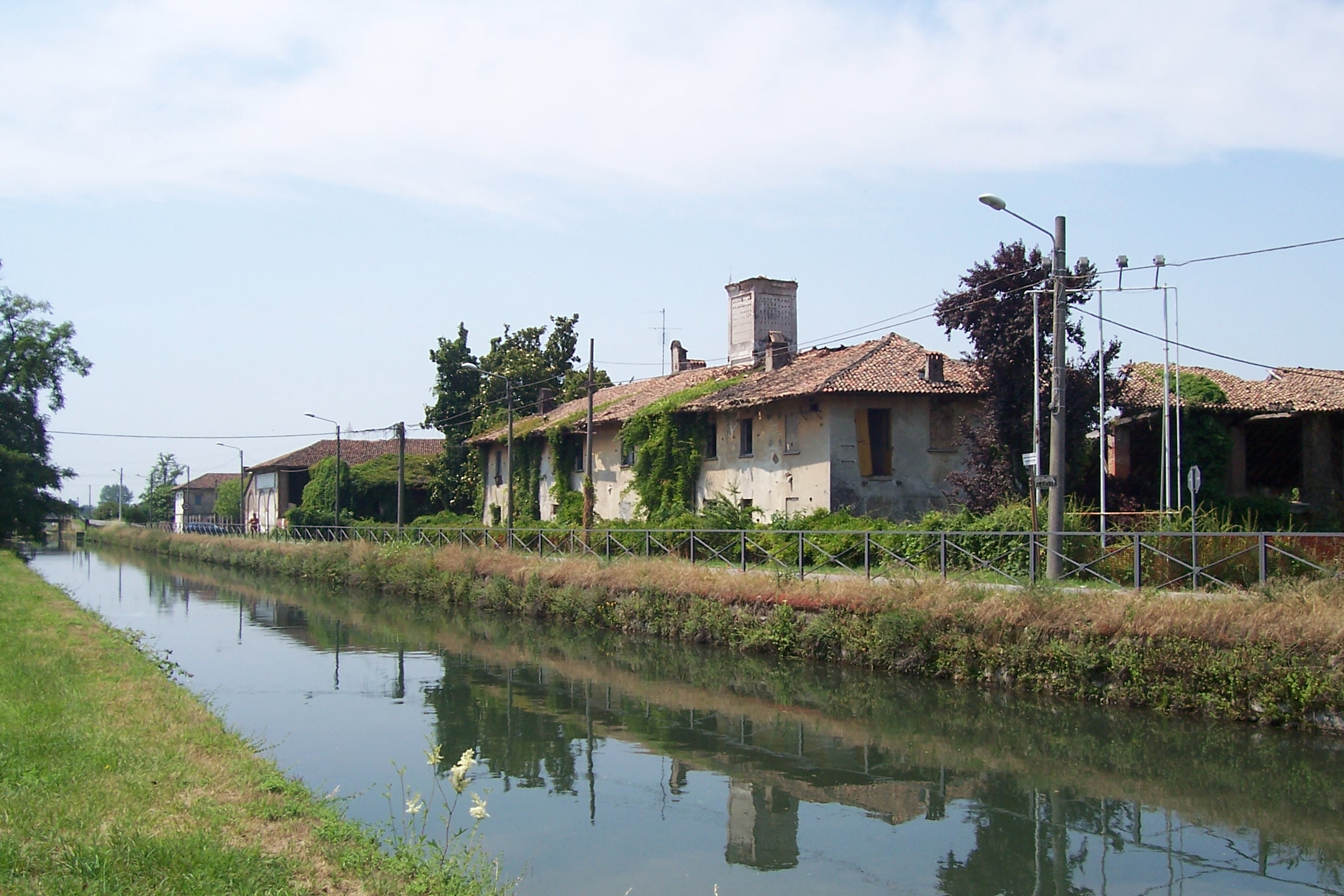
Naviglio Pavese

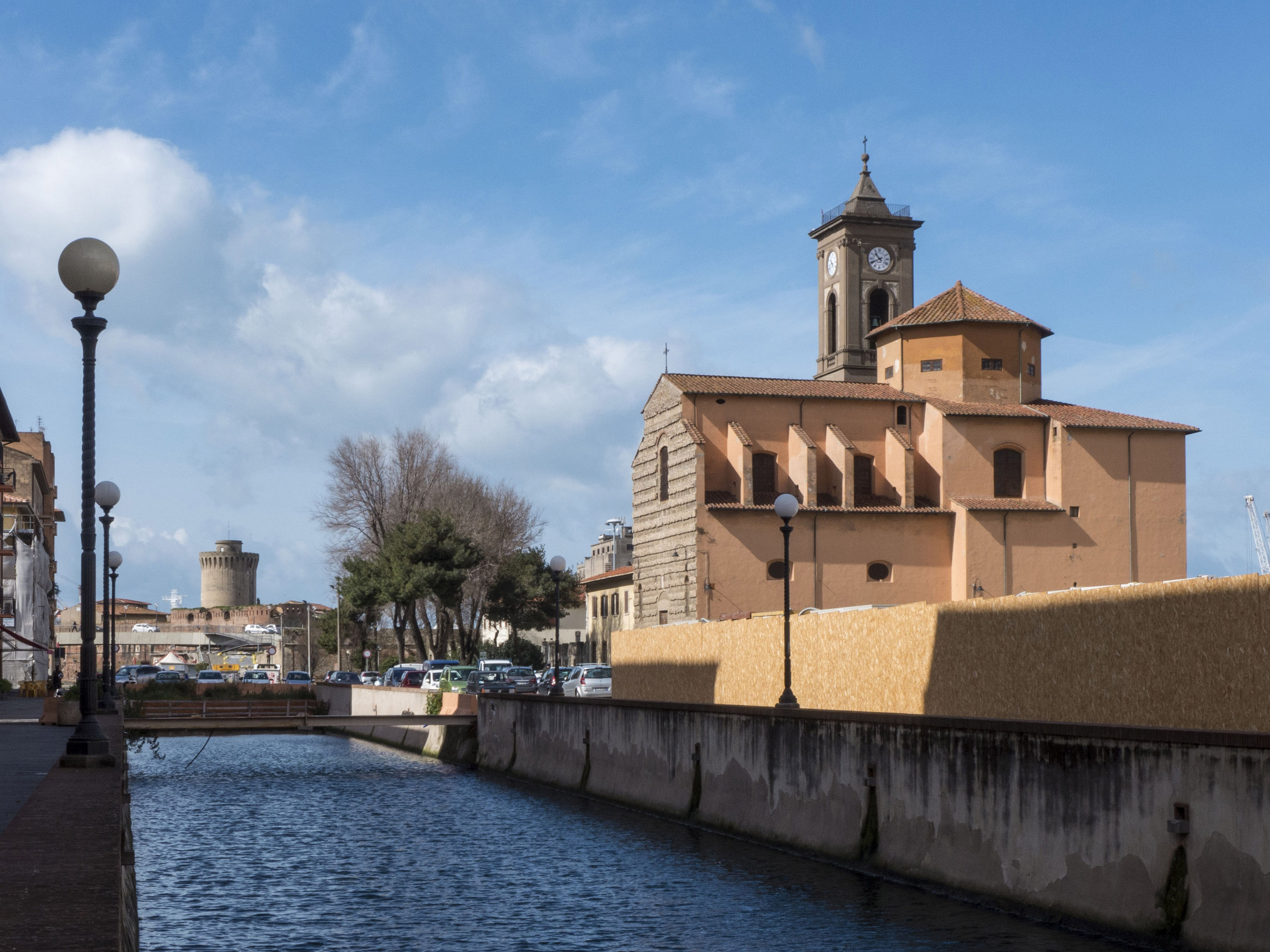
Navicelli channel

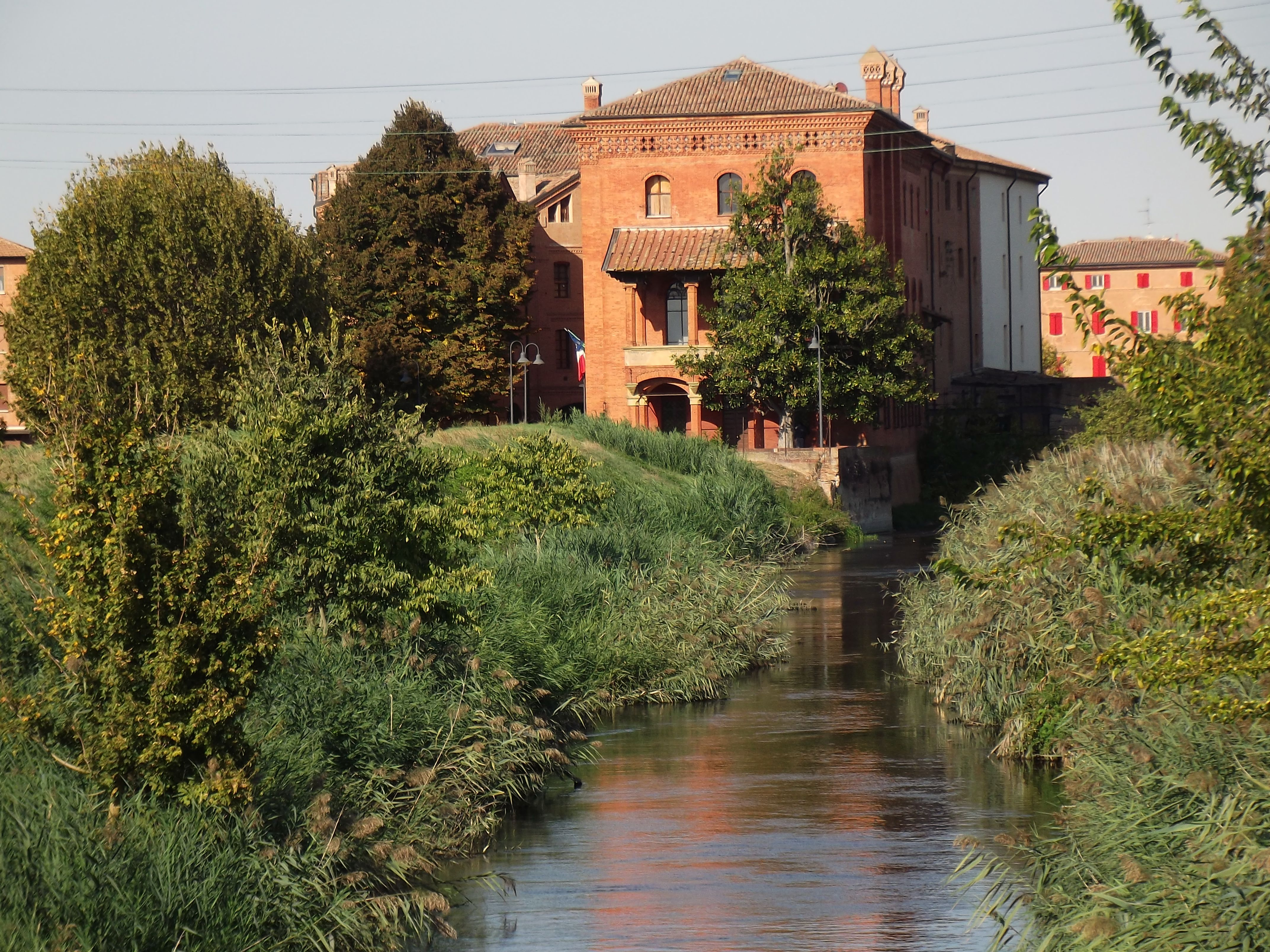
Navile

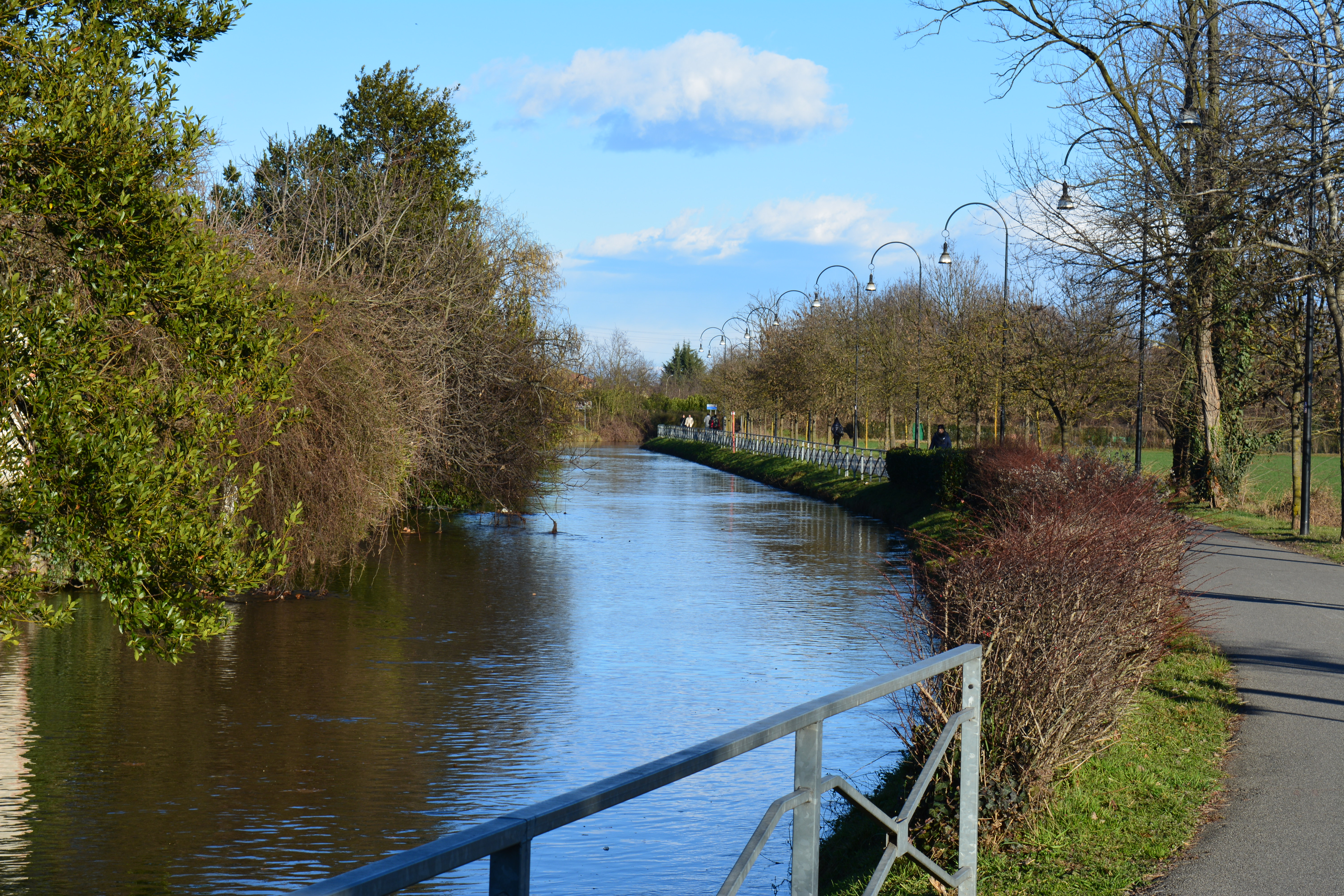
Naviglio Martesana

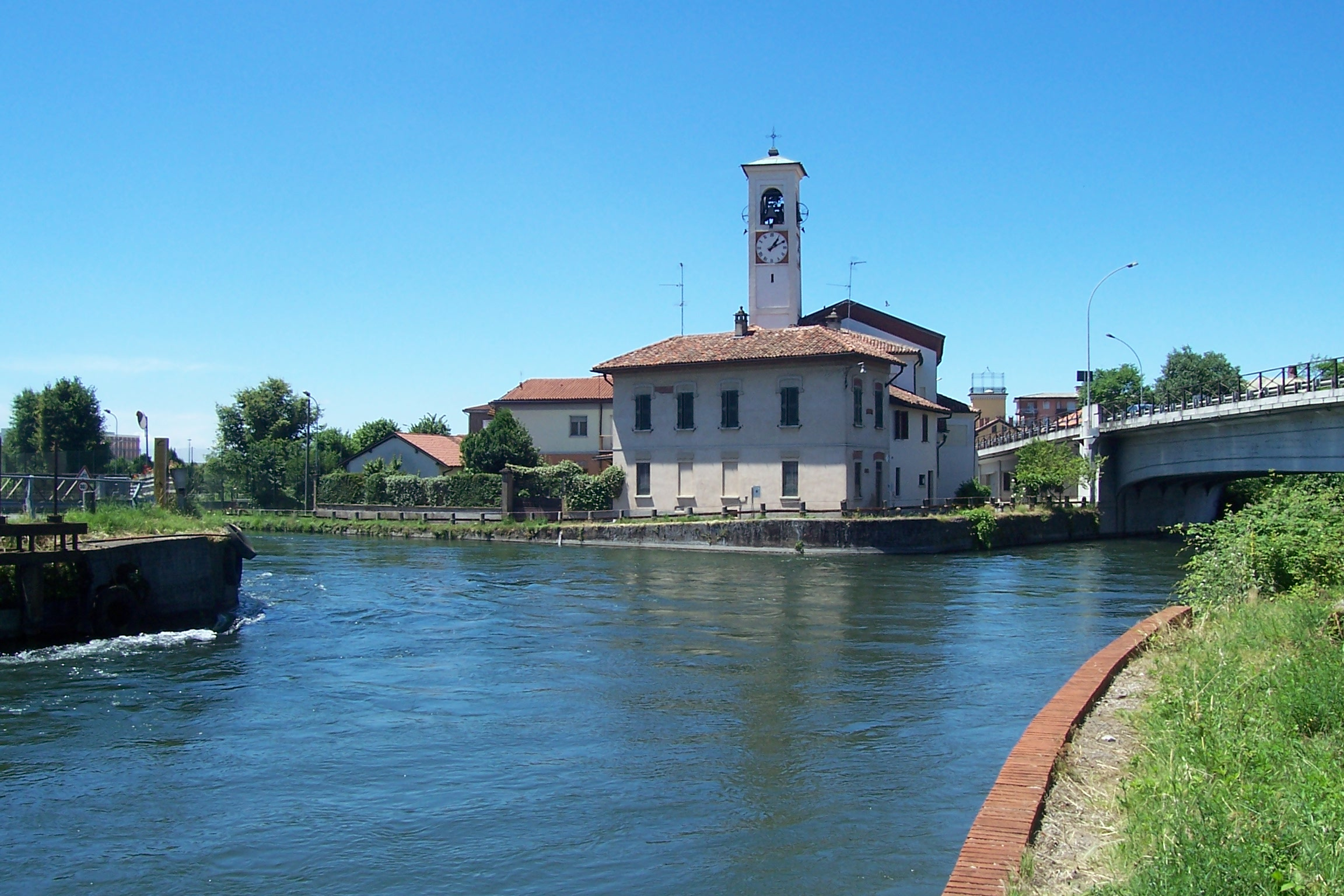
Naviglio di Bereguardo

- Navicelli channel
- Navigli
- Navigliaccio
- Naviglio della Melotta
- Naviglio di Bereguardo
- Naviglio di Brescia
- Naviglio di Cremona
- Naviglio di Goito
- Naviglio di Ivrea
- Naviglio di Paderno
- Naviglio Grande
- Naviglio Interno
- Naviglio Langosco
- Naviglio Martesana
- Naviglio Nuovo
- Naviglio Pavese
- Naviglio Pallavicino
- Naviglio Sforzesco
- Navile

=== O ===
- Ognata
- Osellino

=== P ===
- Parmetta
- Piovego
- Poina
- Porte Contarine

=== R ===
- Regi Lagni
- Rigosa (canal)
- Rino (canal)
- Roggia Acqua Rossa
- Roggia Alchina
- Roggia Babbiona
- Roggia Bolgora
- Roggia Borgogna
- Roggia Borromea
- Roggia Busca
- Roggia Caccesca
- Roggia Castellana
- Roggia Colleonesca
- Roggia Comenduna
- Roggia Comuna
- Roggia Gamarra
- Roggia Grande Bolognina
- Roggia Lonata
- Roggia Maestra
- Roggia Mora
- Roggia Morlana
- Roggia Pallavicina
- Roggia Provaglia
- Roggia Serio Grande
- Roggia Seriola
- Roggione di Sartirana
- Roncajette

=== S ===
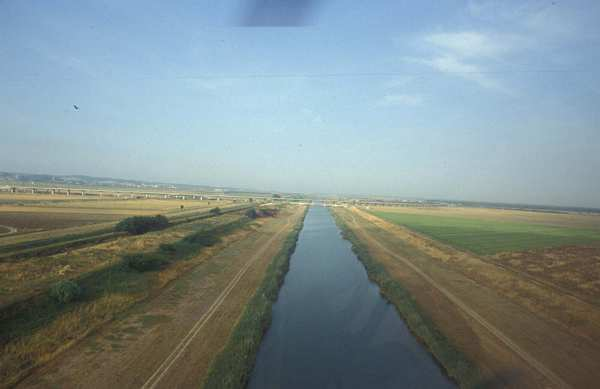
Scolmatore dell'Arno

- Scaricatore Busca-Biraga
- Scolmatore dell'Arno
- Scortico

=== T ===
- Taglio Novissimo
- Taglio Nuovo
- Tartaro (canal)
- Travagliata
- Trenzana

=== U ===
- Uggera

=== V ===
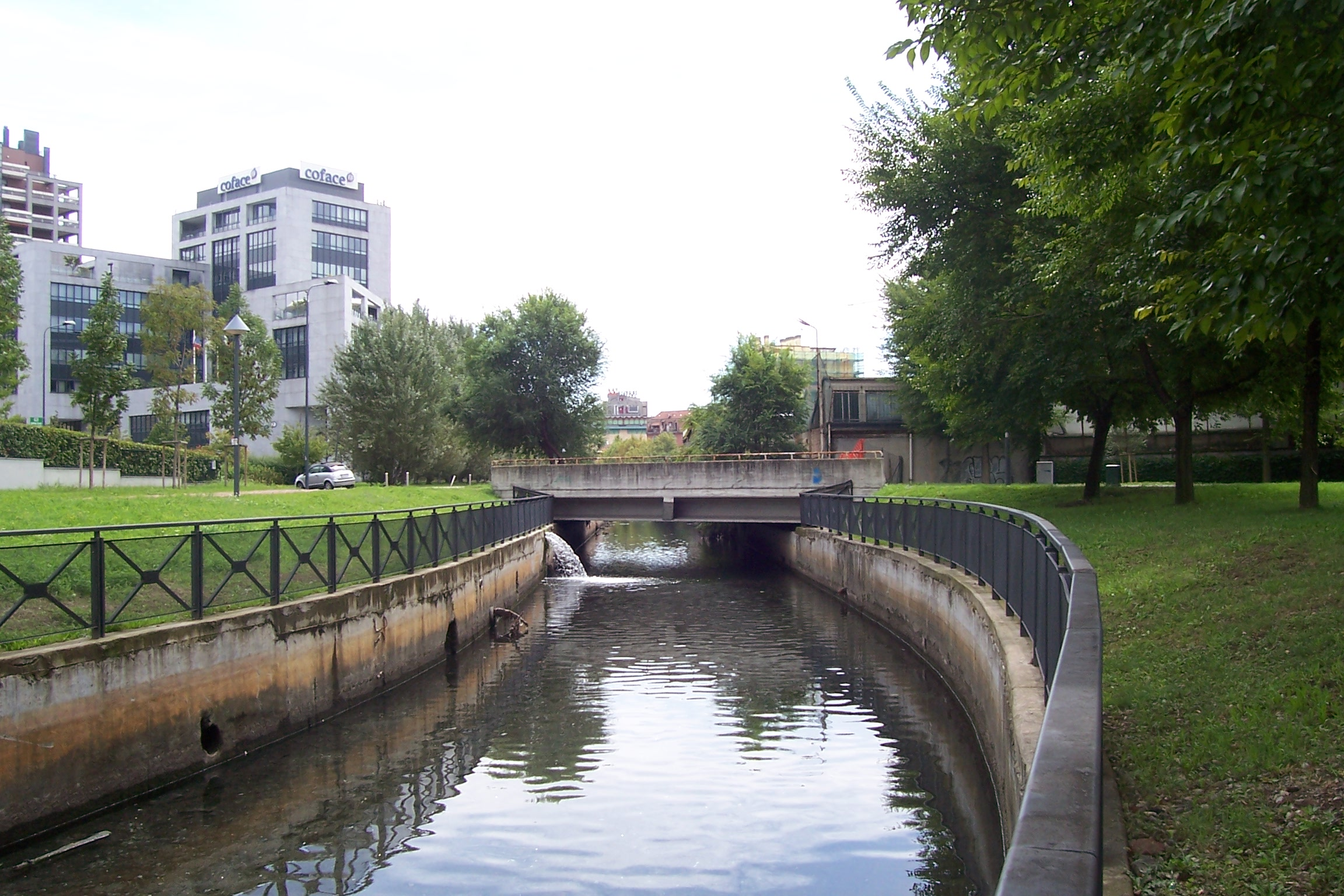
Vettabbia

- Vaso Ariazzolo
- Vaso Fiume di Trenzano
- Vaso Fiume Grande
- Vaso Re
- Vettabbia
- Vigenzone

=== Z ===
- Zena superiore
- Zenetta di Quarto

== See also ==
- Transport in Italy
- List of rivers of Italy
