= Villoresi =

Villoresi is an Italian surname from Tuscany and Lombardy, derived from the towns of Villore in Tuscany and Villores in the Kingdom of Valencia, respectively. Notable people with the surname include:

- Emilio Villoresi (1914–1939), Italian racing driver
- Giulia Villoresi (born 1984), Italian writer
- Lorenzo Villoresi (born 1956), Italian perfumer
- Luigi Villoresi (1909–1997), Italian racing driver
- Pamela Villoresi (born 1957), Italian actress

== See also ==
- Canale Villoresi, canal in Lombardy, Italy
- Villoresi Park, park in Lombardy, Italy
