= Litoranea Veneta =

Coordinates: 45°44′N 13°33′E

The Litoranea Veneta is a network of some 600 km of canals and navigable stretches of river in the Veneto region of north-east Italy.

Until the mid-twentieth century and the reclamation of the extensive areas of marshland around the lower courses of the rivers Po, Adige, Brenta, Sile, Piave, Livenza and Tagliamento, these waterways were of great importance in providing for the transportation of goods and people between the Adriatic coast and the Po plain.

The area served by the Litoranea Veneta is important for its ecology, for the presence of archeological sites and for its architecture. As such the network is being developed to provide a means of transport attractive to tourists.
