= Waterway =

Any navigable body of water

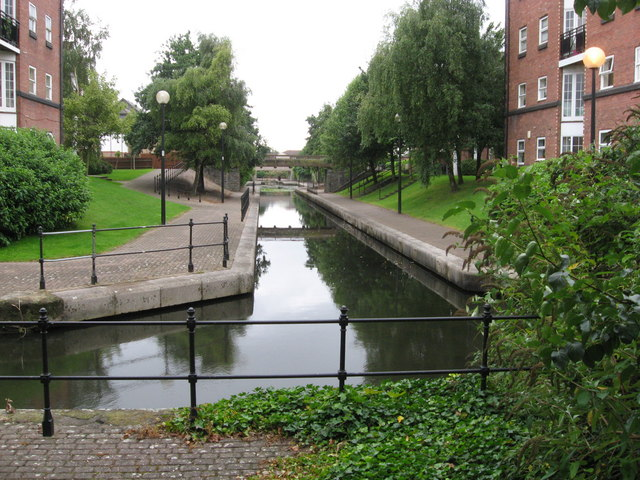
Dock feeder canal in Cardiff, Wales

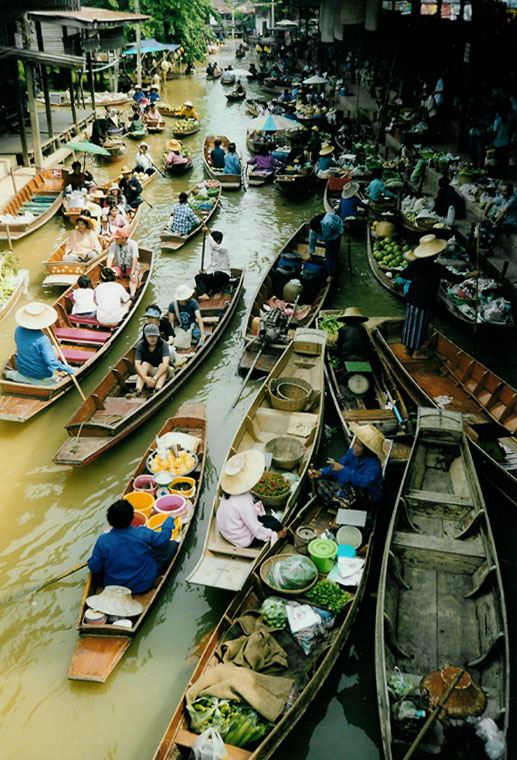
A floating market on one of Thailand's waterways

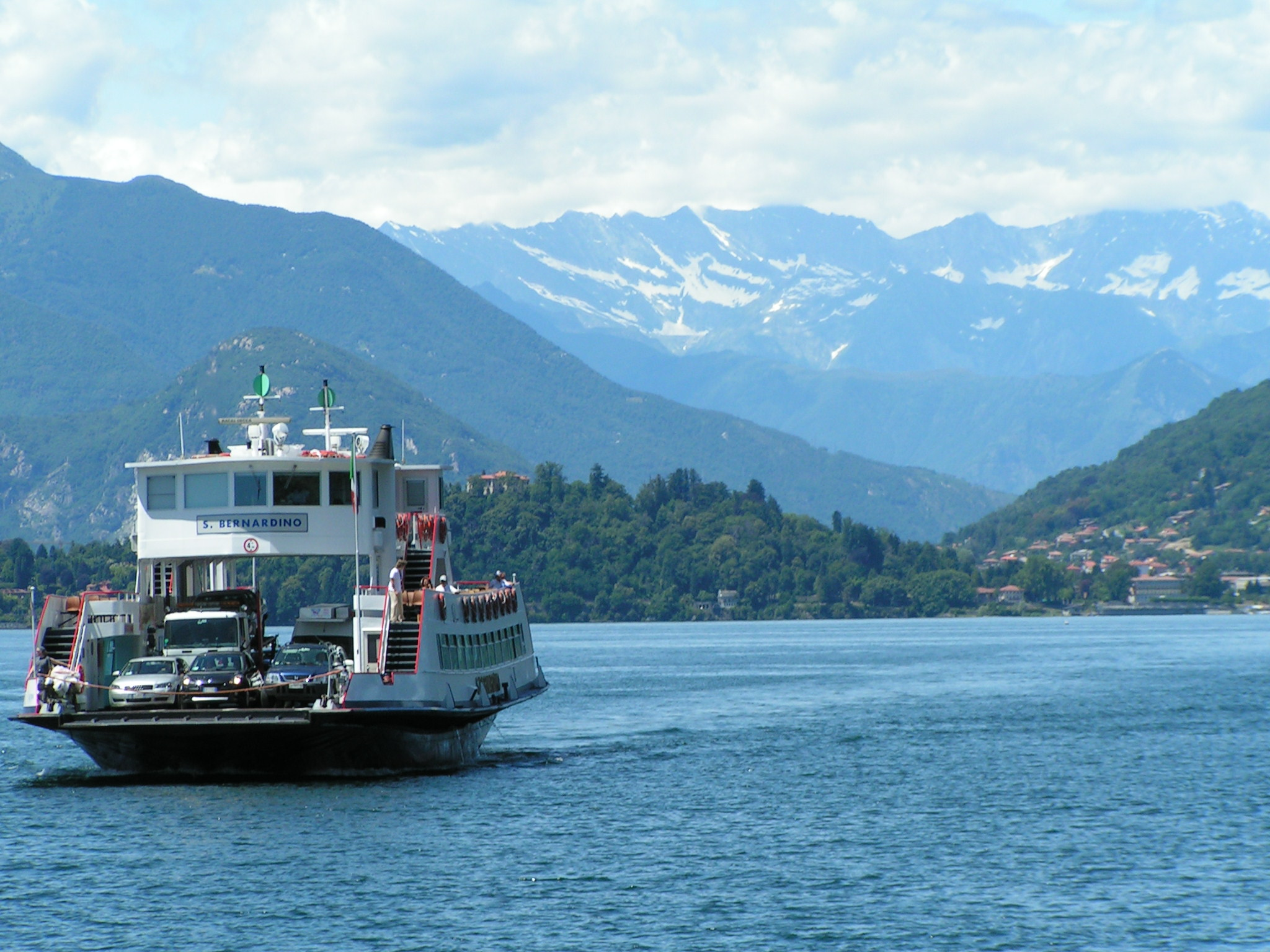
Car ferry across Lake Maggiore, Italy

A waterway is any navigable body of water. Broad distinctions are useful to avoid ambiguity, and disambiguation will be of varying importance depending on the nuance of the equivalent word in other ways. A first distinction is necessary between maritime shipping routes and waterways used by inland water craft. Maritime shipping routes cross oceans and seas, and some lakes, where navigability is assumed, and no engineering is required, except to provide the draft for deep-sea shipping to approach seaports (channels), or to provide a short cut across an isthmus; this is the function of ship canals. Dredged channels in the sea are not usually described as waterways. There is an exception to this initial distinction, essentially for legal purposes, see under international waters.

Where seaports are located inland, they are approached through a waterway that could be termed "inland" but in practice is generally referred to as a "maritime waterway" (examples Seine Maritime, Loire Maritime, Seeschiffahrtsstraße Elbe). The term "inland waterway" refers to navigable rivers and canals designed to be used by inland waterway craft only, implicitly of much smaller dimensions than seagoing ships.

In order for a waterway to be navigable, it must meet several criteria:

- it must be deep enough to accommodate vessels loading to the design draft;
- it must be wide enough to allow passage of the vessels with the design width or beam;
- it must be free of obstacles to navigation such as waterfalls and rapids, or offer a way around them (such as canal locks or boat lifts);
- its current must be mild enough to allow vessels to make headway upstream without undue difficulty;
- the wave height (on lakes) must not exceed the value for which the class of vessel is designed.

Vessels using waterways vary from small animal-drawn barges to immense ocean tankers and ocean liners, such as cruise ships.

In order to increase the importance of inland waterway transport, the European Commission presented a 35-point action plan in June 2021. The main goals are to increase the amount of goods moved through Europe's rivers and canals and to speed up the switch to zero-emission barges by 2050. This is in accordance with the Sustainable and Smart Mobility Strategy and the European Green Deal, which set the target of boosting inland canal and short-sea shipping by 25% by 2030 and by 50% by 2050.

== History ==
Waterways have been an important part of human activity since prehistoric times and navigability has allowed watercraft and canals to pass through every body of water. The Grand Canal (China), a UNESCO World Heritage Site, the oldest known waterway system in the world, is considered to be one of the world's largest and most extensive project of engineering.

== Example of classification of inland waterways ==
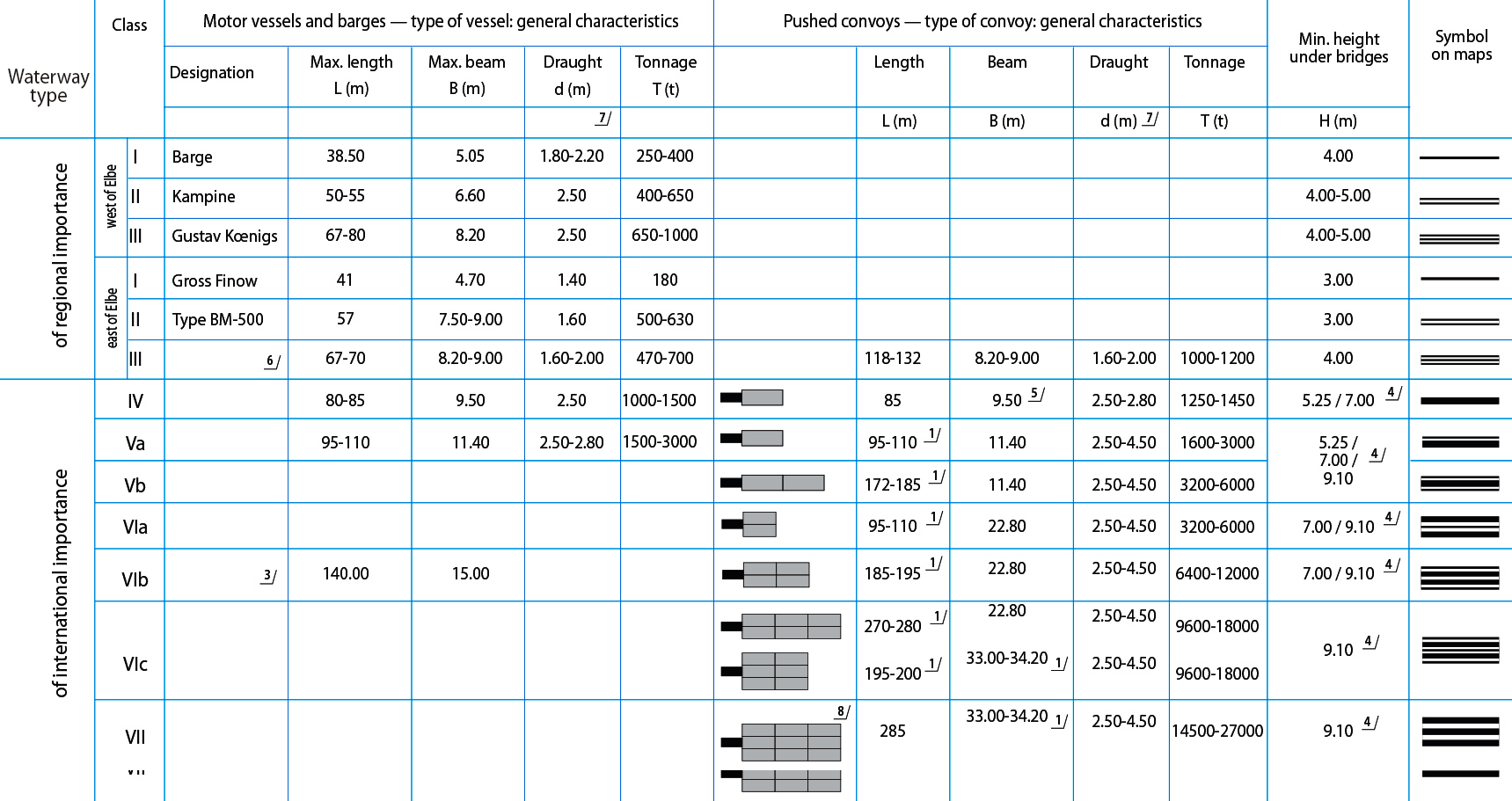
Classification of European inland waterways, adapted from UNECE Map of European Inland Waterways, 4th ed., 2010

The European Conference of Ministers of Transport established in 1953 a classification of waterways that was later expanded to take into account the development of push-towing. Europe is a continent with a great variety of waterway characteristics, which makes this classification valuable to appreciate the different classes in waterway. There is also a remarkable variety of waterway characteristics in many countries of Asia, but there has not been any equivalent international drive for uniformity. This classification is provided by the UN Economic Commission for Europe, Inland Transport Committee, Working Party on Inland Water Transport. A low resolution version of that map is shown here.

== Major waterways ==
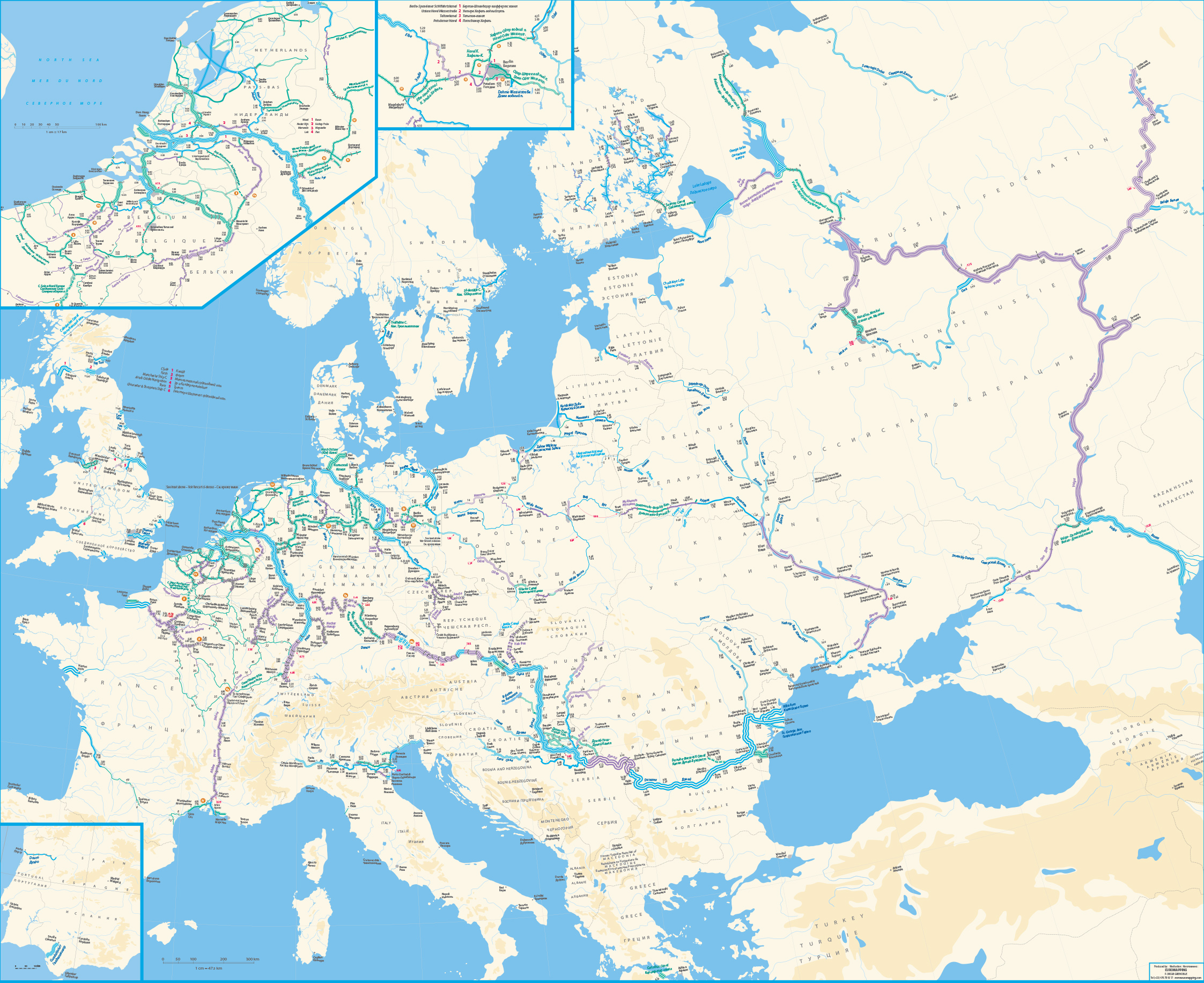
The European waterway network, differentiating waterways by Class (I to VII)

- Suez Canal
- Panama Canal
- Great Lakes Waterway
- Saint Lawrence Seaway
- Waterway E70
- Waterway E40

== See also ==
- Air draft
- Flume
- Inland waterways of the United States
- International waters
- List of canals in France
- List of canals in Italy
- List of countries by waterways length
- List of waterways
- Mill race
- Salish Sea
- Strait of Magellan
- Water trail
