= Navile =

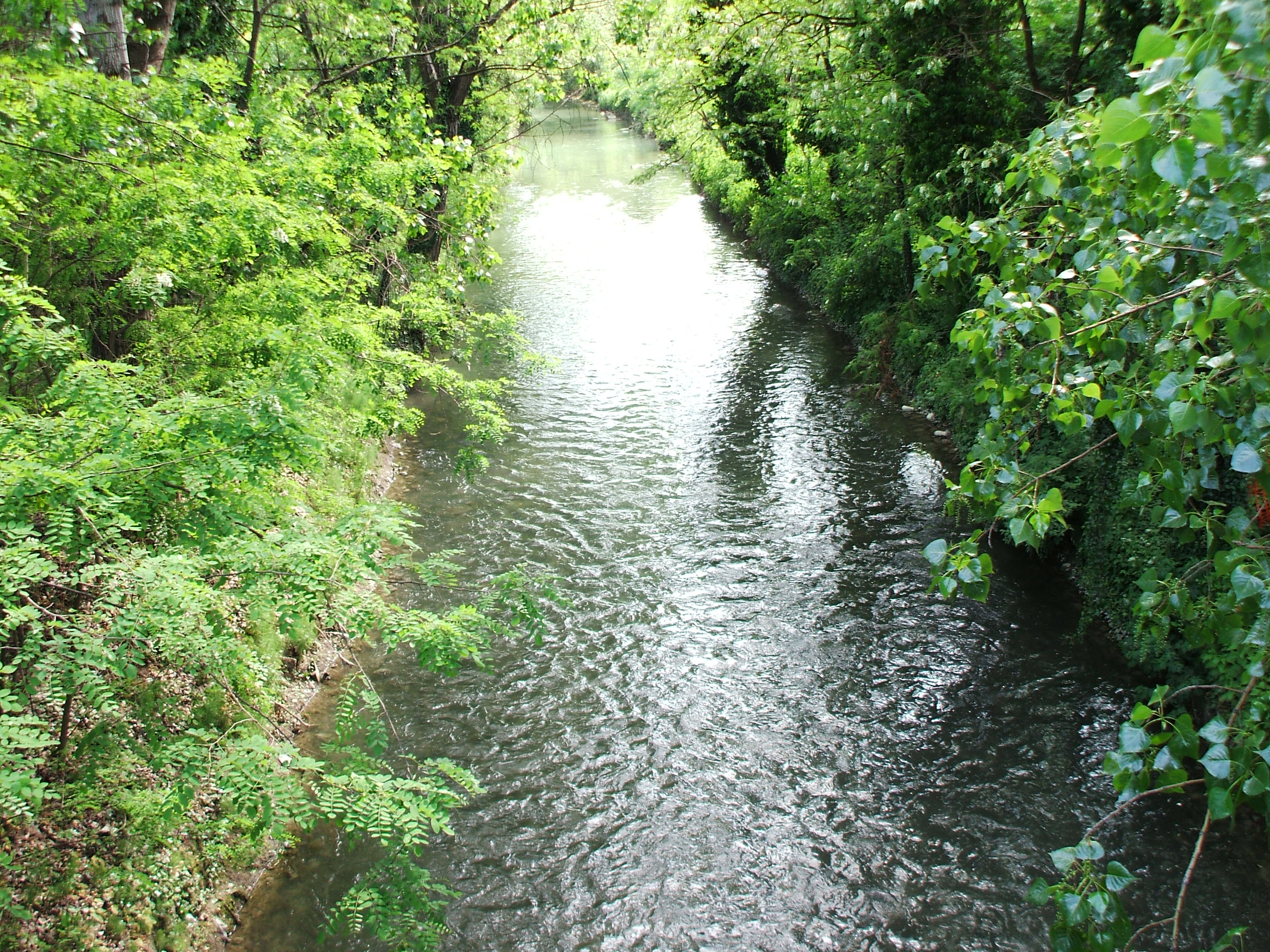
- The canal as seen from Villa Angeletti park, in Bologna

Location
- Country: Italy

Physical characteristics
- Source
  - location: Casalecchio di Reno, Italy
  - elevation: 42 m
- Mouth
  - location: Reno river
- Length: 39.3 km (24.4 mi)

The Navile is a canal in Emilia-Romagna, northern Italy. It originates from the Reno canal, which owes its name (and waters) to the Reno River, from which it originates at the Chiusa di Casalecchio di Reno.

== Geography ==
The Navile runs from south to north; it goes through the town of Bologna and crosses the Bolognese plain until it joins the Reno river once again near Passo Segni after a journey of about 40 km, of which 5.3 from the Chiusa di Casalecchio to Bova di Via Lame (where the Port was located).

Its regime is partly determined by adjustments of the locks, partly by the collection of meteoric waters in Bologna and a portion of the plain; its ordinary average flow rates can be estimated at 10 cubic meters per second, while the maximum flow can reach 100 cubic meters per second.

== History ==
The Chiusa di Casalecchio di Reno, where the Canale di Reno originates, was built in the upper Middle Ages as an impressive work of hydraulic engineering in masonry: the Chiusa has a width of over 250 meters and the intake work with the canal and the spillovers has a length of over 2 km, entirely in masonry, which made it one of the most outstanding such works in Europe at the time. It is thought that the primitive construction dates back to before the year 1000, but according to other Authors the date of the first construction is the 1191. Destroyed several times by the ruinous floods of the Reno, it has always been rebuilt and represents, still today, one of the greatest examples of hydraulic engineering existing and built before the advent of reinforced concrete.

In 1548 the first port was built in Bologna, along the Navile, to serve the increasing commercial flows to and from the city.

The canal was used for navigation until as late as 1948.

After the Port of Bologna was dismantled, the canal has been exclusively used for irrigation and reclamation, as it is no longer suitable for navigable use. Sometimes, during floods, it floods into the countryside. The reclamation canal Diversivo collects the excess water from the Navile and joins the Savena canal at Casoni, part of the municipality of Malalbergo. However, a series of locks remain of the Bolognese port system and of the navigable past.

In 1866, water from a well nearby the Port was bottled and locally sold; it was explicitly advertised as healthy, although the city had suffered from cholera until a few years earlier.

== List of features ==
=== Cities on the Navile ===
- Casalecchio di Reno (as Canale di Reno)
- Bologna
- Castel Maggiore
- Bentivoglio
- Malalbergo
