= Idrovia Ferrarese =

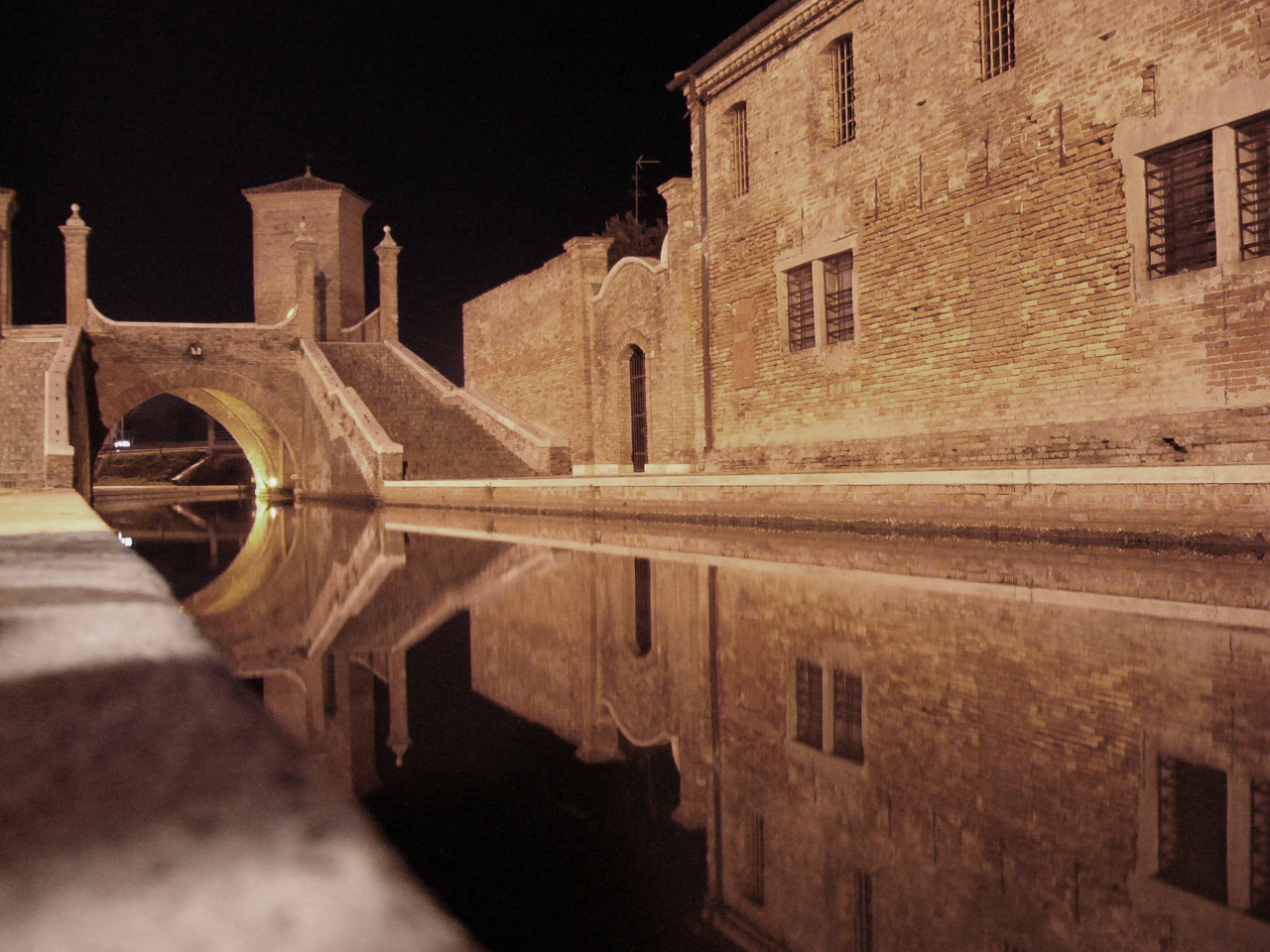
Comacchio by night

The Idrovia Ferrarese (waterway of Ferrara) is a 70 km stretch of navigable water in the Italian Province of Ferrara, falling within the Po Delta Park. It links the river Po at Pontelagoscuro (frazione of Ferrara) to the Adriatic at Porto Garibaldi (frazione of Comacchio). The waterway, which is navigable by motor boats, is constituted by the Boicelli Canal from Pontelagoscuro to Ferrara (5.5 km), the Volano branch of the Po from Ferrara to Fiscaglia di Migliarino (34.5 km) and the Migliarino-Porto Garibaldi Canal from Migliarino to the sea (30 km).
