= Lorenzo Villoresi =

Italian perfumer

- Born: April 5, 1956 (age 70); Florence, Italy
- Occupations: Perfumer, Author
- Spouse: Ludovica Passi
- Children: Alessandro, Arturo, Gemma
- Website: http://www.lorenzovilloresi.it

Lorenzo Villoresi (born 1956) is a perfumer in Florence, Italy. He is best known for his custom-made fragrances and potpourri who works as an independent perfumer outside the big fragrance houses. In 2006, Villoresi was awarded the Prix François Coty, a perfume industry honor.

== Influences ==
His study and travel in the Middle East has greatly influenced his work and some of his most important fragrances are in the amber family with notes of spices, amber, incense, resins, vanilla, and sandalwood.

The LV house opened in 1990 in the 15th-century family palazzo, overlooking the Arno.

== Fragrances ==
Notable creations of his "fragranze fantasia" line include:

- Piper Nigrum (1999), a spicy amber fragrance
- Dilmun (2000), an amber fragrance
- Teint de Neige (2000), a floral woody musk fragrance
- Yerbamate (2001), a green fragrance
- Alamut (2006), a woody amber fragrance

== Publications and events ==
Volloresi has written several on the art of perfume:

- Il Profumo: Cultura, storia e tecniche (1995, Ponte alle Grazie; ISBN 88-7928-271-9): The book contains descriptions of perfumery techniques, an overview of raw materials and essences, separate chapters on the history of perfume and famous perfume quotes in literature, a special section dedicated to aromatherapy, and an extensive glossary.
- L'arte del bagno. Ricette e segreti per la cura, il piacere, la bellezza (1996, Ponte alle Grazie; ISBN 88-7928-550-5)
- Il Mondo del Profumo (1996/1997, RCS Libri & Grandi Opere): Edited by Villoresi, this is 70 booklets in 3 volumes.
- L'arte del bagno: una guida al più sensuale rito del corpo (2001, Ponte alle Grazie; ISBN 88-7928-340-5)

He is involved with the Pitti Immagine's FRAGRANZE conferences, an annual event bringing together perfumers worldwide, dedicated to the art and culture of fine perfumes. He also is a founding member of L'Accademia dell’Arte del Profumo in Florence.
