= Candiano Canal =

Canal in Italy

Coordinates: 44.4558°N 12.2470°E

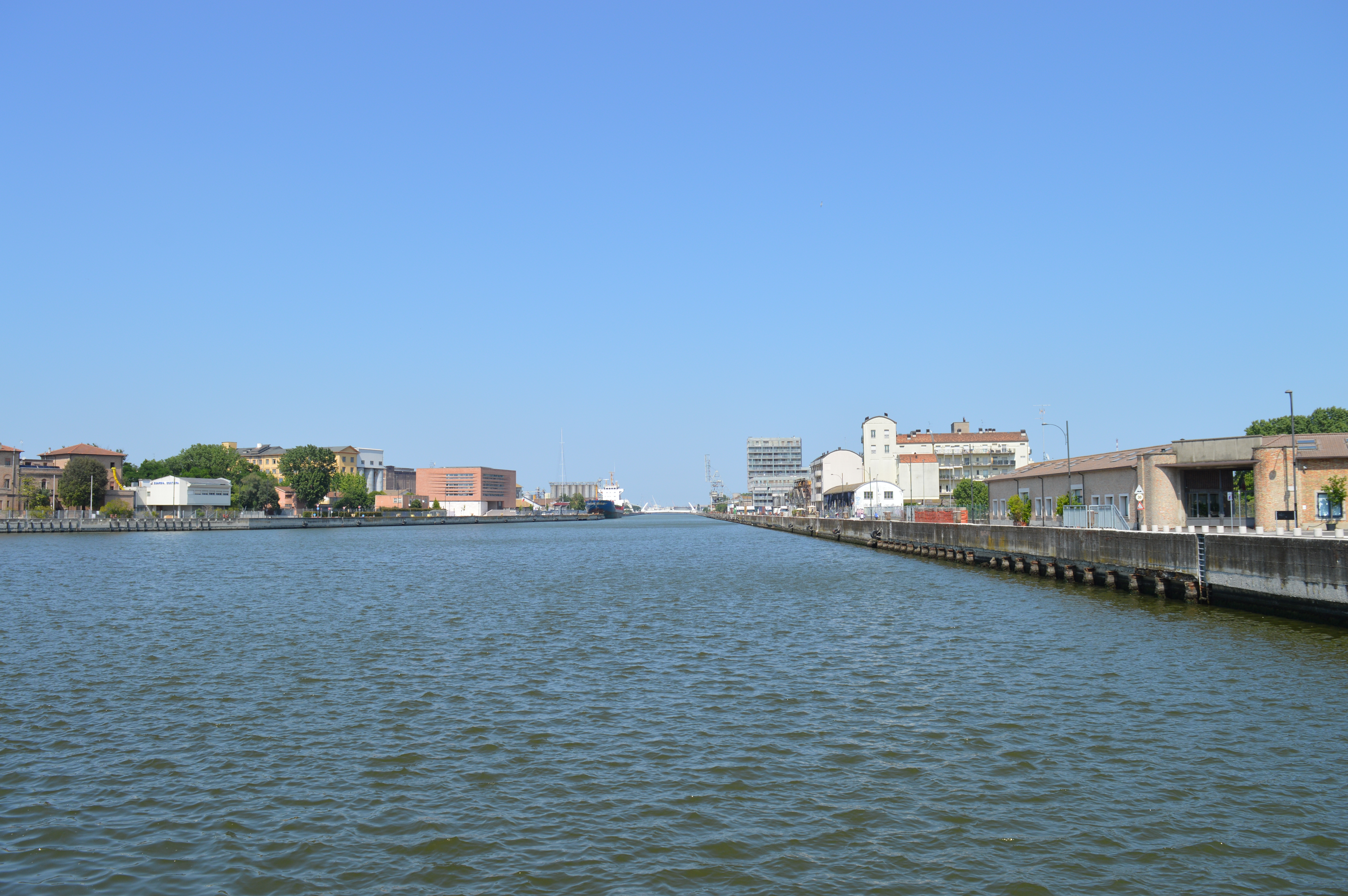
- The Candiano Canal as seen from Ravenna

Specifications
- Status: Open

History
- Original owner: Port of Ravenna
- Date of first use: 1738
- Date completed: 1738

Geography
- End point: Adriatic Sea
- Branch of: Ravenna Canal System

The Candiano Canal, also known as the Canal Corsini, is a canal connecting the Italian city of Ravenna to the Adriatic Sea. The canal was built as part of a construction program begun by Pope Clement XII in the early 18th century. The artificial waterway connects the Monote and Ronco rivers to the Adriatic Sea. At 11 km long, the canal is the largest artificial canal in Italy.

== History ==
=== Background ===
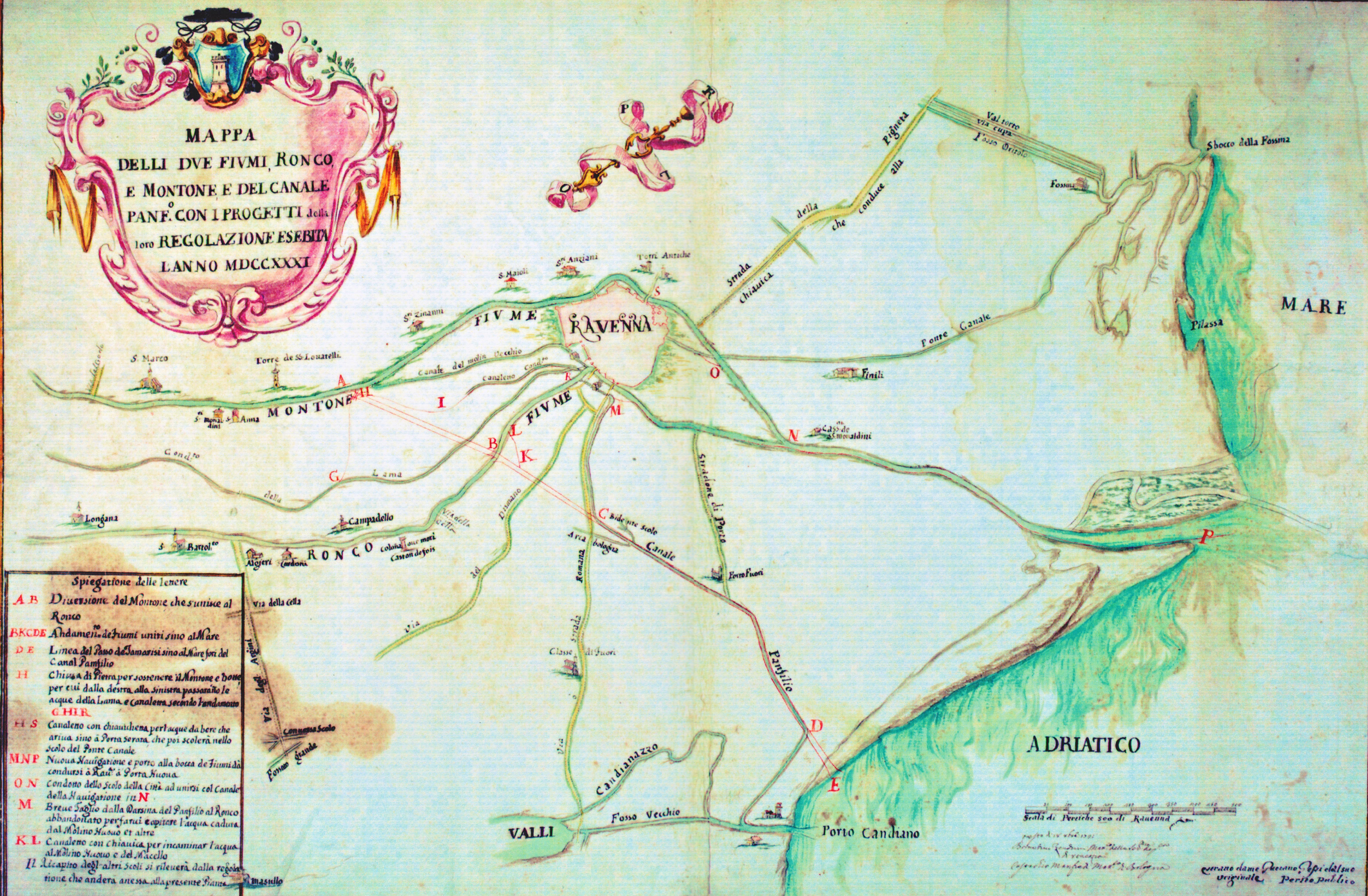
1731 map of the canals of Ravenna. The map is located inside the Classense Library (Inventory N. Tarlazzi: 120b).

Historically, the city of Ravenna suffered episodes of destructive flooding. To combat this issue, the city of Ravenna built over the centuries a series of canals and waterways to prevent the Montone, Ronco, and Candiano Rivers from flooding. A lack of drinking water was also a chronic problem for the city, as the three aforementioned rivers are shallow, muddy, and as such provided poor drinking water. In the 7th century the Po river was diverted, leading to more sediment being swept downriver to Ravenna. Over the centuries this sediment clogged the smaller canals in the city and caused the coastline to expand outwards, disrupting the Port of Ravenna. In 1636 both the Montone and Ronco rivers flooded, destroying 140 buildings in the city.

=== Construction ===
To better facilitate the flow of water and increase access to the Port of Ravenna, a plan for a new canal was formulated in the early 18th century. The canal was constructed to tie existing canals and the three rivers of Ravenna together. When completed, the canal was planned to stretch 11 kilometers to the Adriatic. Construction was completed in 1738. The canal was named for Pope Clement XII, as at the time the Papal States controlled Ravenna. A second canal, the Panfilio Canal (known as the Canal Magne) was also constructed during this time. In the 18th century the Candiano Canal was deepened and slightly shortened as part of a infrastructure expansion project launched by Agostino Rivarola.

The economic importance of the Candiano Canal declined after railroads became widespread in the 19th century. However, the canal continued to service the city and the Port of Ravenna. The importance of the canal increased after the Port of Ravenna (which contained petroleum processing facilities) underwent an economic revival during the 1973 oil crisis. The canal was dredged in 2000 and in 2008, deepening it to a depth of 11.5 m (38 ft).
