= Villoresi Park =

Park in Monza, Italy

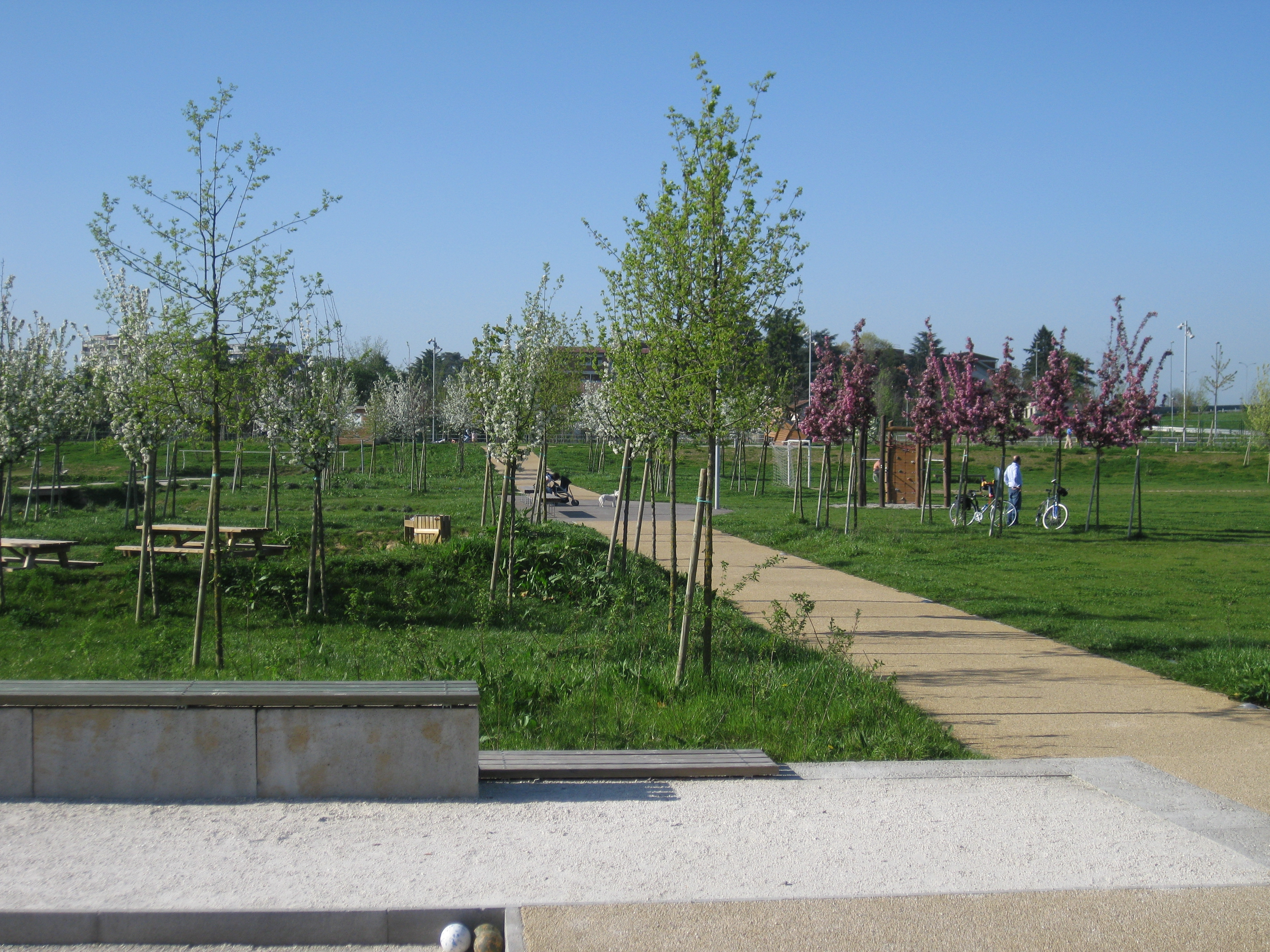
Villoresi Park

Villoresi Park is a large park in Monza, northern Italy. Measuring 3.5 hectares, it was inaugurated in July 2010 by the Mayor Marco Maria Mariani. For the area of Brianza this is the second green area after Parco di Monza, and was built in the district of San Fruttuoso, near the fishing lake of the same name via Boscherona flowing channel, Canale Villoresi.
