= Naviglio di Paderno =

Coordinates: 45°41′N 9°27′E

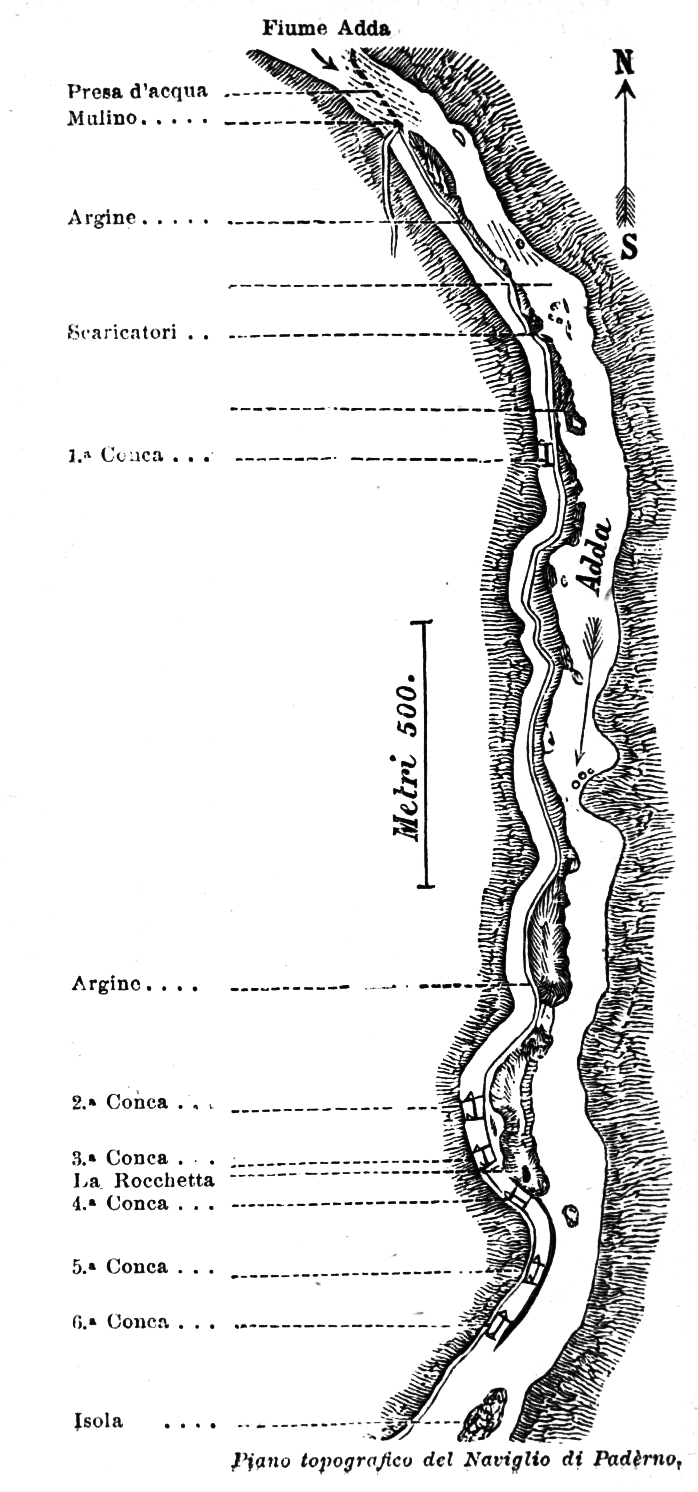
Plan of the canal

The Naviglio di Paderno was a navigable canal of the Navigli system in the Lombardy region of Northern Italy. Approximately 3 kilometers (1.8 mi) long, it was built to bypass the rapids on the Adda River in the Paderno d'Adda section of the river.

This is the canal where Leonardo da Vinci is said to have experimented his new mitred gates for pound locks. Leonardo had been at court in Milan in 1496 but only completed his plans for the experiment in 1518. Many of them were too novel for the time and were not fully followed for long.

== Sources ==
- Andrea Castagna, Il Naviglio di Paderno, Biblion, 2016, ISBN 978-88-98490-58-5
- Edo Bricchetti, Giuseppe Codara, Navigli del milanese ieri e oggi. Meravigli, 2017.
