= Canale Villoresi =

Canal in Lombardy, Italy

Coordinates: 45°40′N 8°40′E

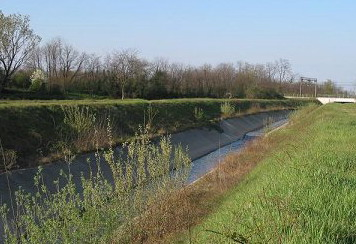
- The Canale Villoresi

Specifications
- Length: 86 km (53 mi)

History
- Principal engineer: Eugenio Villoresi
- Construction began: 1877
- Date completed: 1890

Geography
- Start point: River Ticino near the village of Somma Lombardo
- End point: Adda River

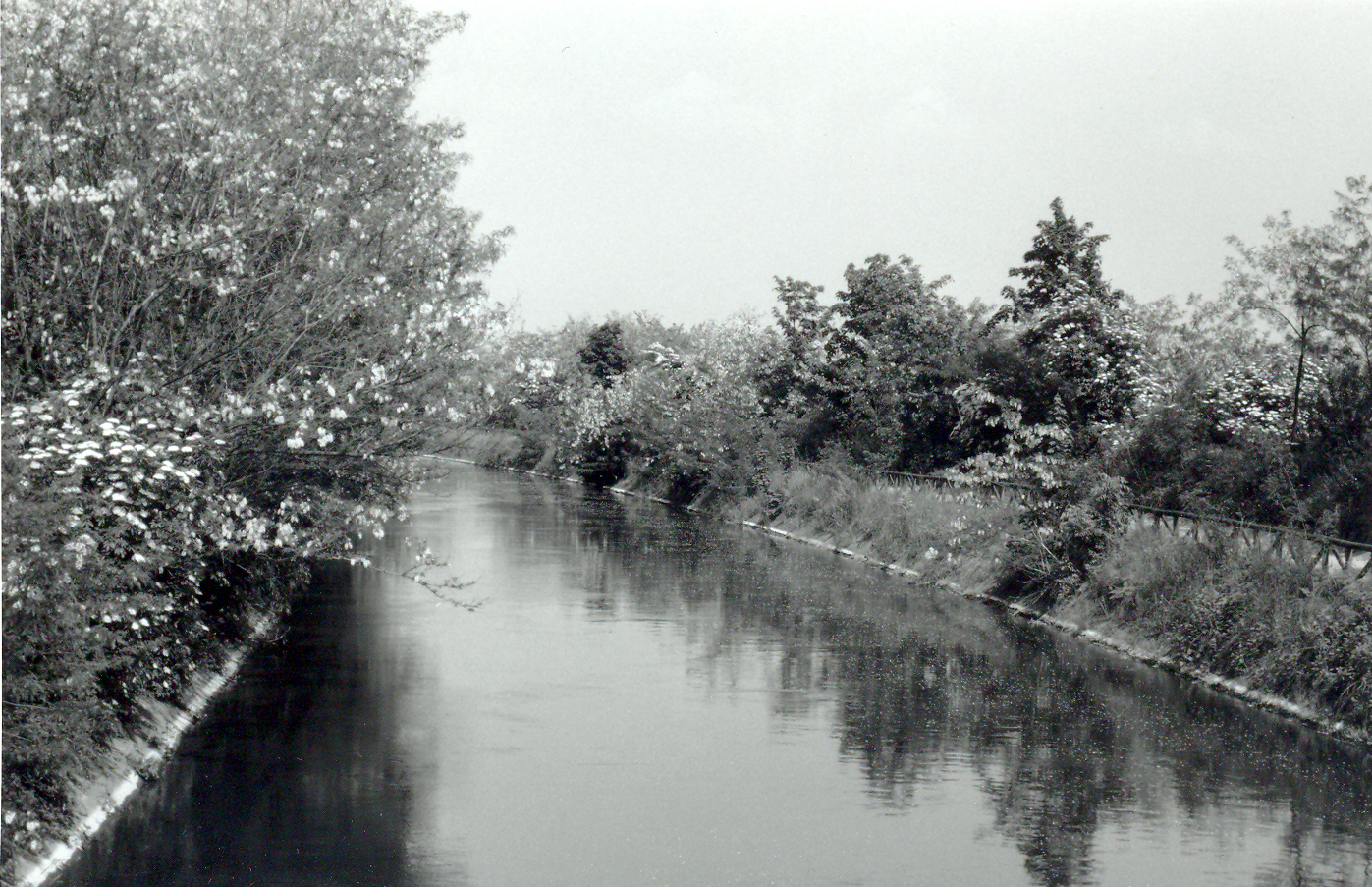
The canal in spring between Busto Garolfo and Villastanza (Parabiago)

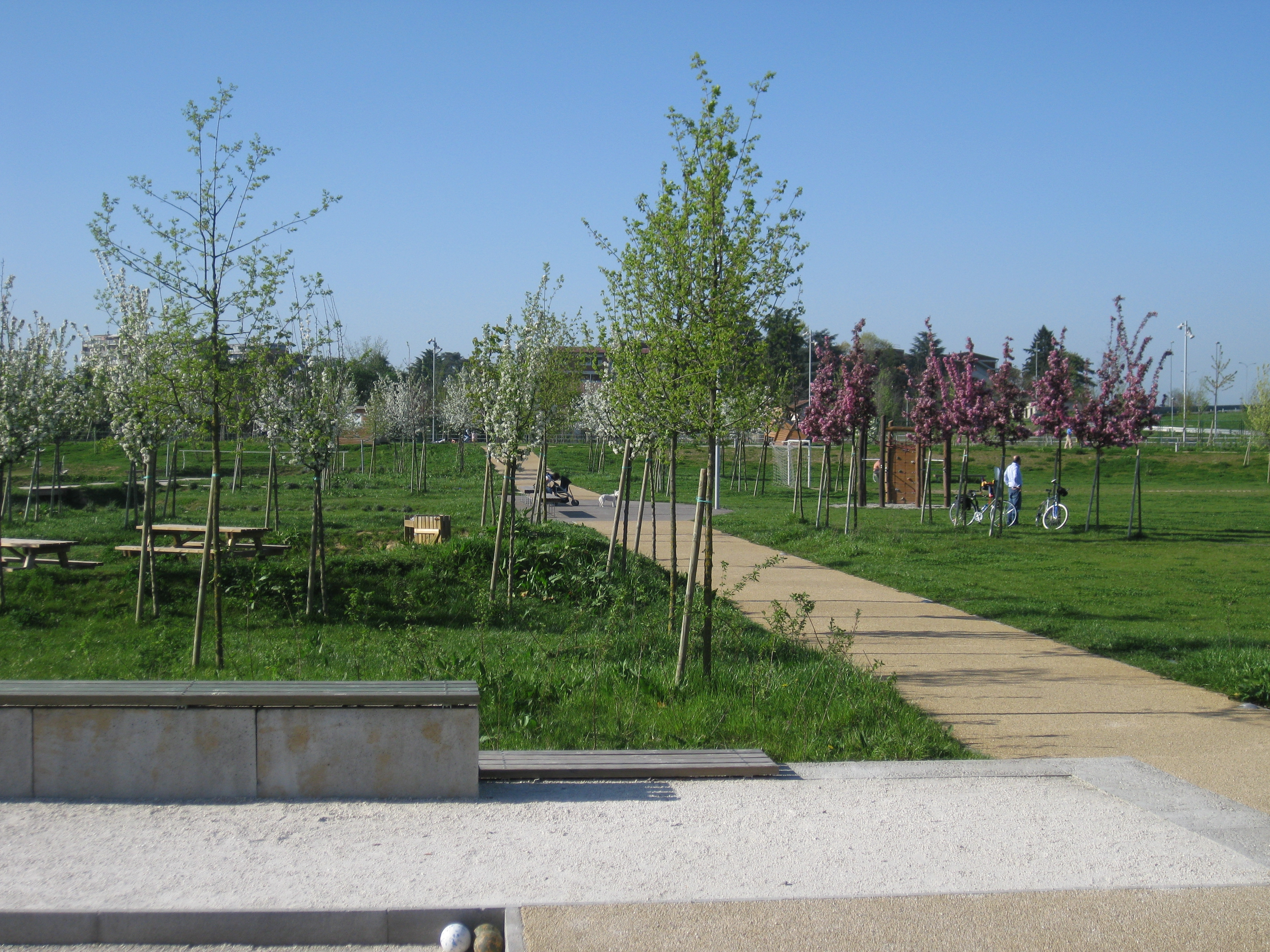
Villoresi Park in Monza

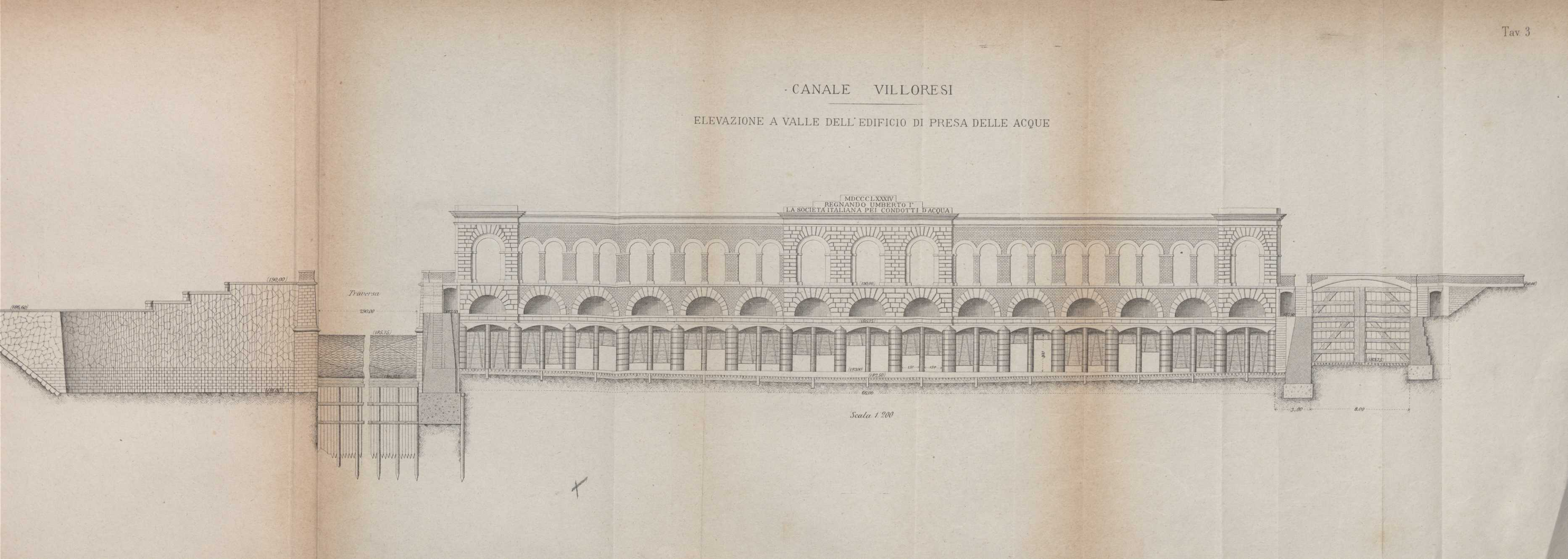
Drawing of the front of the canale Villoresi downstream building, 1887

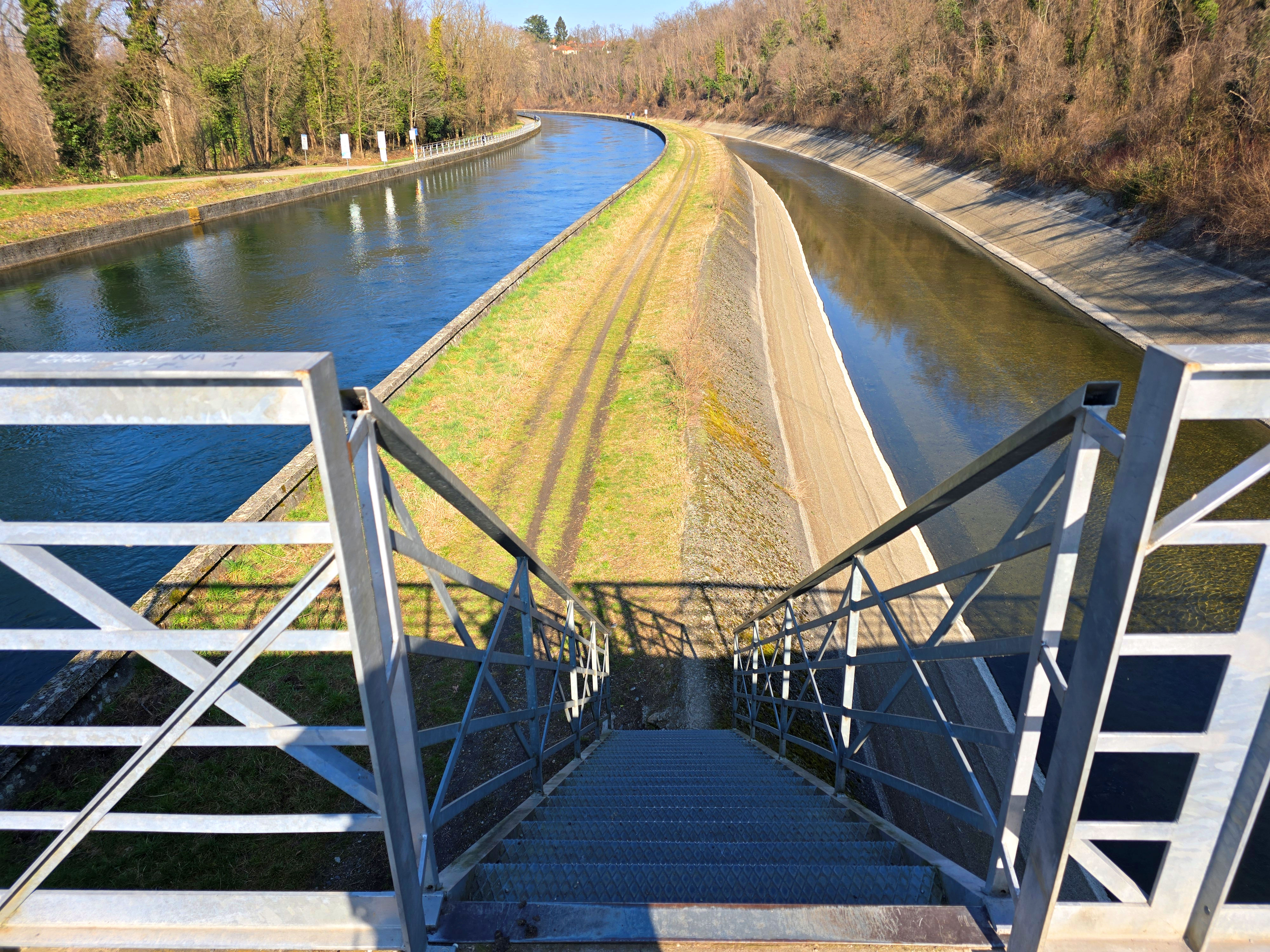
Somma Lombardo (Varese): the Industrial Channel (on the left) and Villoresi Channel (on the right), a little after the Panperduto dam

Canale Villoresi is a canal in Italy; it was the brainchild of Lombardy engineer Eugenio Villoresi.

It originates from the River Ticino near the village of Somma Lombardo, and runs eastwards for 86 kilometres (53 mi) to the Adda River.

Construction began in 1877, but Villoresi himself died two years later. The works were completed in 1890 by a consortium.

Irrigation was the canal's main reason for being but the addition of locks enabled cargoes of sand to be carried along it.

== See also ==
- Villoresi Park

== Sister projects ==
Media related to Canale Villoresi at Wikimedia Commons
