= Ombrone Diversion Canal =

Artificial canal in Tuscany, Italy

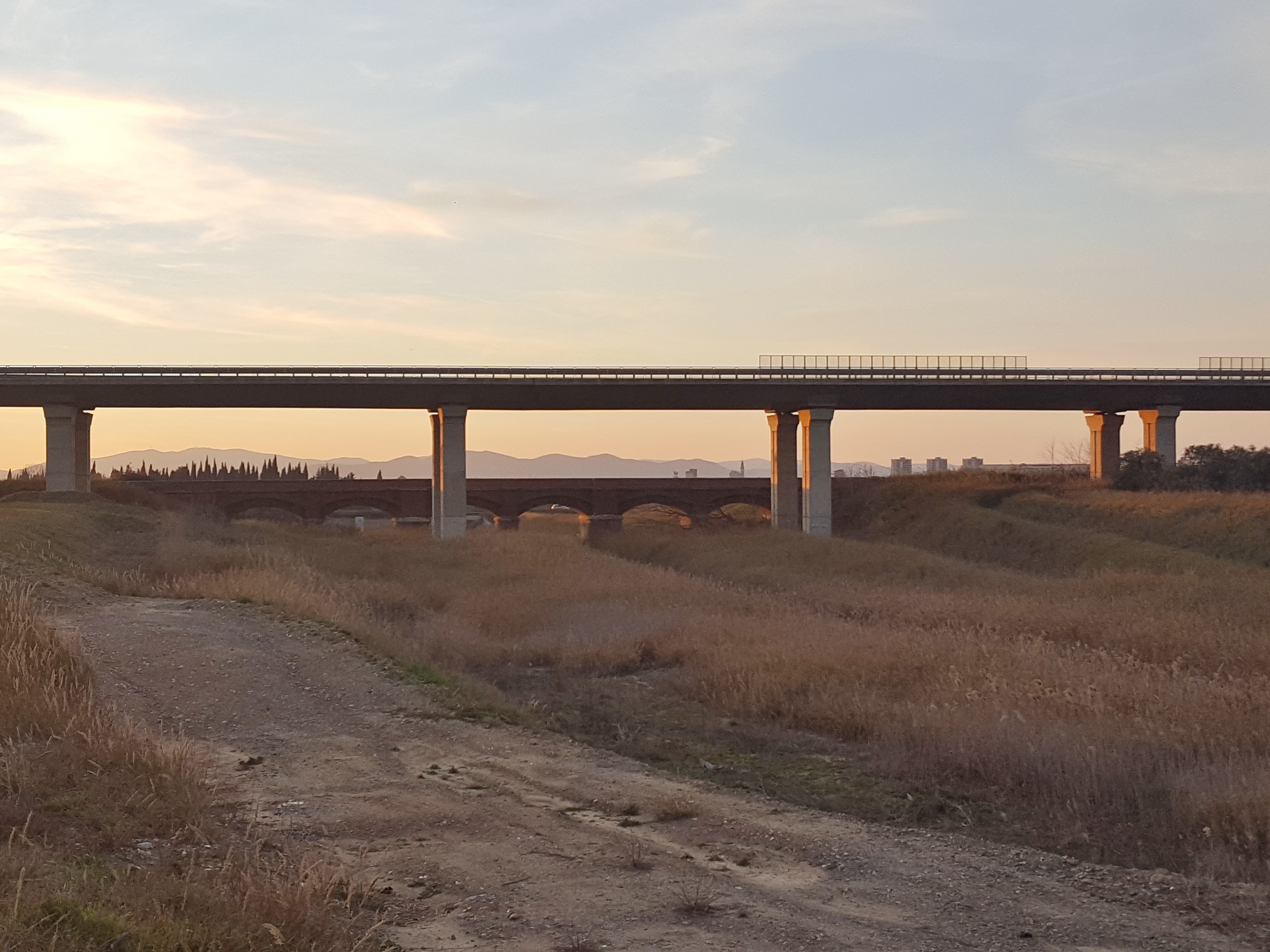
- The canal near the Aurelia viaduct and San Martino bridge

Location
- Country: Italy
- Region: Tuscany
- Municipality: Grosseto

Physical characteristics
- Source: Ombrone
  - location: Steccaia Dam, San Martino
  - coordinates: 42.7665°N 11.167583°E
- Mouth: Diaccia Botrona Nature Reserve
  - coordinates: 42.772333°N 10.934889°E
- Length: 17 km (11 mi)

The Ombrone Diversion Canal (Italian: Canale diversivo dell'Ombrone) is an artificial watercourse in Grosseto, Tuscany, central Italy. Constructed between 1829 and 1830, it formed one of the earliest hydraulic works connected with the reclamation of the former Lake Prile marshes in the Maremma region.

== History ==
The canal was excavated following the decree issued by Grand Duke Leopold II of Tuscany on 27 November 1828, which initiated the large-scale reclamation of the marshlands surrounding the former Lake Prile. The project was conceived by statesman and engineer Vittorio Fossombroni and implemented by engineer Alessandro Manetti, head of the Grosseto reclamation office.

The canal was designed to divert sediment-rich waters from the Ombrone into the marshes, depositing alluvial material intended to gradually fill and reclaim the swampy terrain for agricultural use. Construction works were completed in approximately 160 days between 1829 and 1830.

The inauguration of both the Steccaia Dam and the diversion canal took place on 26 April 1830 in the presence of the Grand Duke.

During the urban expansion of Grosseto in the 20th century, part of the canal within the city was covered in 1979.

== Course ==
The canal originates at the Steccaia Dam, where waters from the Ombrone River are diverted into a short feeder channel known as the Mandraccio. At Ponte Tura, these waters join those of the Beveraggio ditch and continue westward towards Grosseto.

The canal crosses the district of San Martino and passes beneath several bridges and road crossings, including the Aurelia bypass viaduct and the Scansanese provincial road bridge. Near the city's power station, the watercourse turns north-westward, skirting the Sterpeto cemetery.

Within the urban area of Grosseto, part of the canal runs underground beneath Viale Europa, continuing under the Pisa–Rome railway and Ponte Massa before resurfacing north of the city along the road towards Castiglione della Pescaia.

Near Marrucheto, the canal intersects with the San Rocco Canal and continues across the reclaimed plains of Grosseto before eventually reaching the wetlands of the Diaccia Botrona Nature Reserve.

== See also ==
- Diaccia Botrona Nature Reserve
- Lake Prile
- San Leopoldo Canal
- San Rocco Canal

== Sources ==
- Rassegna dei lavori pubblici e delle strade ferrate. Vol. 7. Rome. 1914.
- La memoria della terra. Grosseto: Consorzio di Bonifica Grossetana. 2001.
- Carlotti, David (1865). Statistica della provincia di Grosseto. Florence: Barbera.
- Chelazzi, Lorenzo; Colombini, Isabella; Fallaci, Mario; Gagnarli, Elena (2008). La memoria dell'acqua nella pianura grossetana (PDF). Florence: CNR. pp. 17–19.
- Innocenti, Mario; Innocenti, Stefano (2003). Grosseto: briciole di storia. Vol. 3. Grosseto: Innocenti.
- Pertempi, Silvia, ed. (1989). La Maremma grossetana tra il '700 e il '900. Città di Castello: Labirinto.
- Rustici, Giada (November 2018). "Il canale diversivo: monumento di una Maremma ritrovata". Maremma Magazine: 38–42.
- Simoncelli, Antonio Valentino (2008). Bonifiche nel Grossetano. Arcidosso: Effigi.
- Simoncelli, Antonio Valentino (2016). Cronache maremmane dalla fine del '700 a oggi. Grosseto: Innocenti.
