= San Rocco Canal =

Artificial canal in Tuscany, Italy

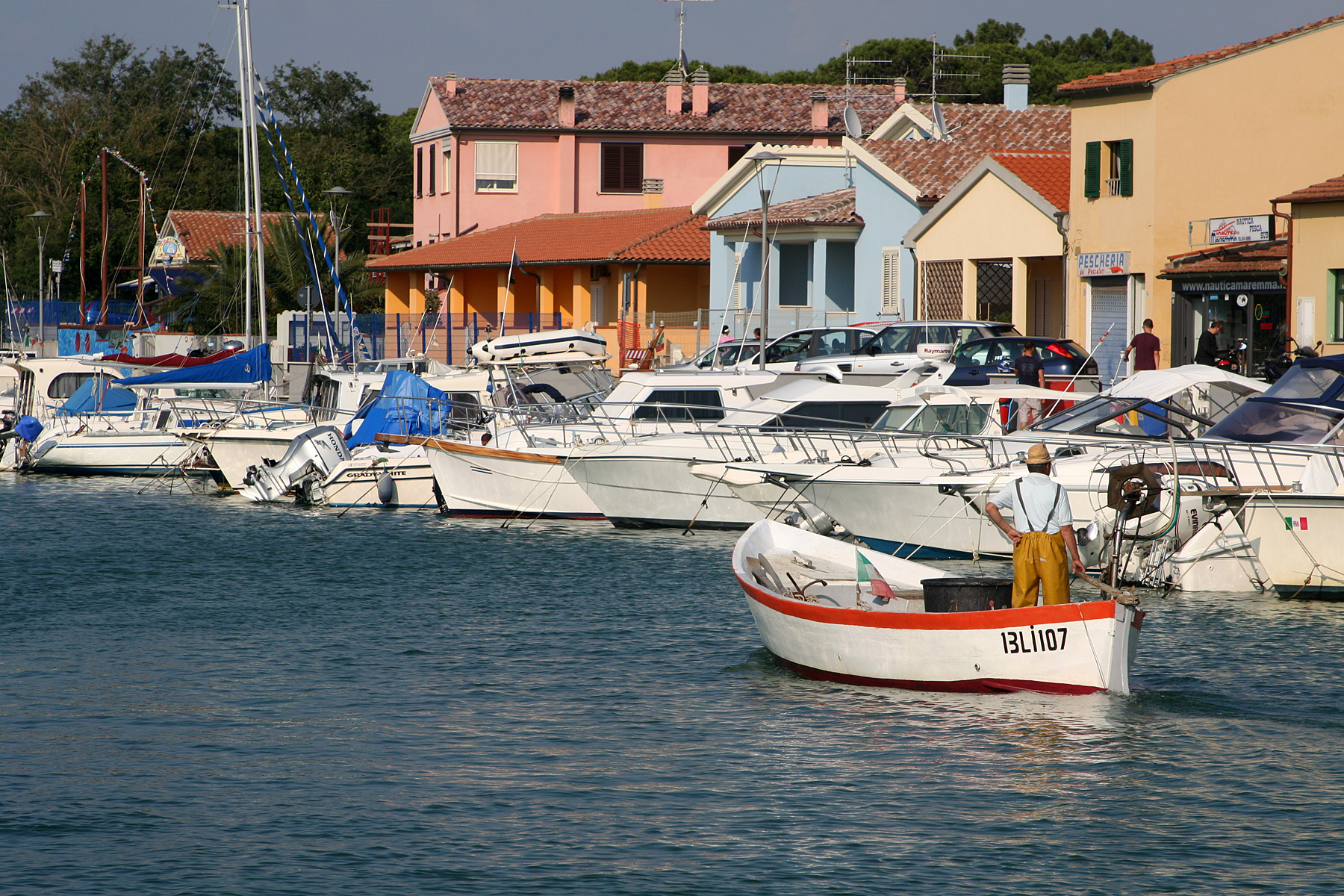

Location
- Country: Italy
- Region: Tuscany
- Municipality: Grosseto

Physical characteristics
- Source
  - location: Bottegone, Grosseto
  - coordinates: 42.852198°N 11.095541°E
- Mouth: Tyrrhenian Sea
  - location: Marina di Grosseto
  - coordinates: 42.712407855°N 10.981447501°E

The San Rocco Canal (Italian: Canale emissario di San Rocco) is an artificial canal in the municipality of Grosseto, Tuscany, central Italy. It forms part of the drainage system created during the reclamation of the former Lake Prile marshes in the 19th century.

== History ==
The canal was excavated following a decree issued on 17 November 1828 by Grand Duke Leopold II of Tuscany as part of the large-scale reclamation works of the former Lake Prile marshland between Grosseto and Castiglione della Pescaia. The project was directed by Alessandro Manetti, Federico Capei, and Giacomo Grandoni.

The reclamation system included three major drainage canals intended to carry excess water from the reclaimed plains to the sea: the San Rocco Canal, the San Leopoldo Canal, and the Bilogio Canal. The San Rocco Canal was completed in 1838.

During the Fascist-era land reclamation campaigns of the 20th century, the canal system was modernised and integrated with an expanded hydraulic network serving the Grosseto plain. The electric pumping station of Casotto Venezia was inaugurated to regulate and channel water from surrounding drainage ditches into the canal.

== Course ==
The canal receives the waters of the Fosso San Rocco, which originates near Bottegone, north-west of Grosseto. It crosses the Grosseto plain, initially running alongside the former Aurelia road corridor before turning westward near the outskirts of the city.

Along its course, the canal intersects with the Ombrone Diversion Canal, receives the waters of the Beveraggio ditch, and flows near the Grosseto military airport and the settlement of Principina Terra.

The canal then follows the route towards Marina di Grosseto, from which it separates near Casotto Venezia. After passing the industrial area of the seaside resort, it enters the coastal pine forest known as Tombolo before reaching the Tyrrhenian Sea at the tourist harbour of Marina di Grosseto. Near its final stretch stands the historic Fort San Rocco, built in the late 18th century.

== Sources ==
- La memoria della terra. Grosseto: Consorzio di Bonifica Grossetana. 2001.
- Barontini, Corrado; Telloli, Gaetano (2002). Sciangai: cuore di Marina di Grosseto. Roccastrada: Il mio amico.
- Chelazzi, Lorenzo; Colombini, Isabella; Fallaci, Mario; Gagnarli, Elena (2008). La memoria dell'acqua nella pianura grossetana (PDF). Florence: CNR. p. 23.
- Guarducci, Anna, ed. (2006). Mappe e potere: pubbliche istituzioni e cartografia nella Toscana moderna e contemporanea (secoli XVI–XIX). Florence: All'insegna del giglio.
- Guerrini, Giuseppe (1989). Da San Rocco a Marina di Grosseto. 1789–1989. Pisa: Pacini.
- Innocenti, Mario; Innocenti, Stefano (1999). Marina di Grosseto. Il litorale maremmano da Bocca d'Ombrone al canale di San Leopoldo. Grosseto: Innocenti.
- Simoncelli, Antonio Valentino (2008). Bonifiche nel Grossetano. Percorso storico dal 1200 ad oggi. Arcidosso: Effigi.
- Simoncelli, Antonio Valentino (2016). Cronache maremmane dalla fine del '700 a oggi. La guerra per le acque e per il lavoro. Grosseto: Innocenti.
