= Abbey of San Pancrazio al Fango =

Monastery in Tuscany, Italy

- Abbazia di San Pancrazio al Fango (Italian)
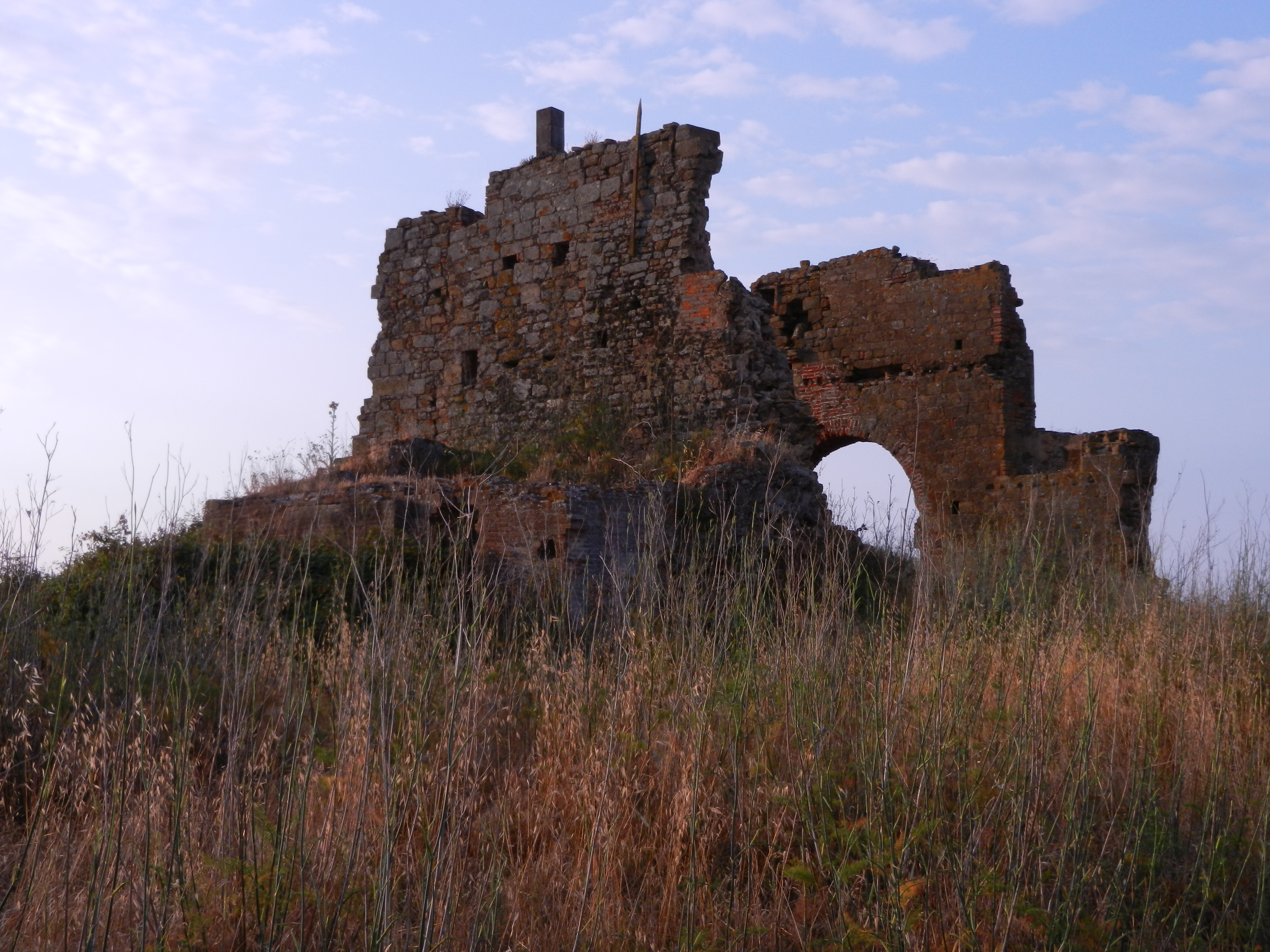
- Abbey of San Pancrazio al Fango
- 42°46′48.1″N 10°56′59″E
- Location: Isola Clodia, Diaccia Botrona Natural Reserve; Grosseto, Tuscany
- Country: Italy
- Denomination: Roman Catholic

Architecture
- Architectural type: Abbey
- Style: Romanesque

The Abbey of San Pancrazio al Fango (Italian: Abbazia di San Pancrazio al Fango) is a ruined abbey in the comune of Grosseto, Tuscany, Italy.

It is situated between Grosseto and Castiglione della Pescaia, in the heart of the Diaccia Botrona Nature Reserve, not far from the La Badiola estate. The church, which is now in ruins, was built in the Middle Ages on a slight hill overlooking the surrounding wetlands, once occupied by Lake Prile near a building from Roman times.
