= Casa Rossa Ximenes =

Historic building in Castiglione della Pescaia, Italy

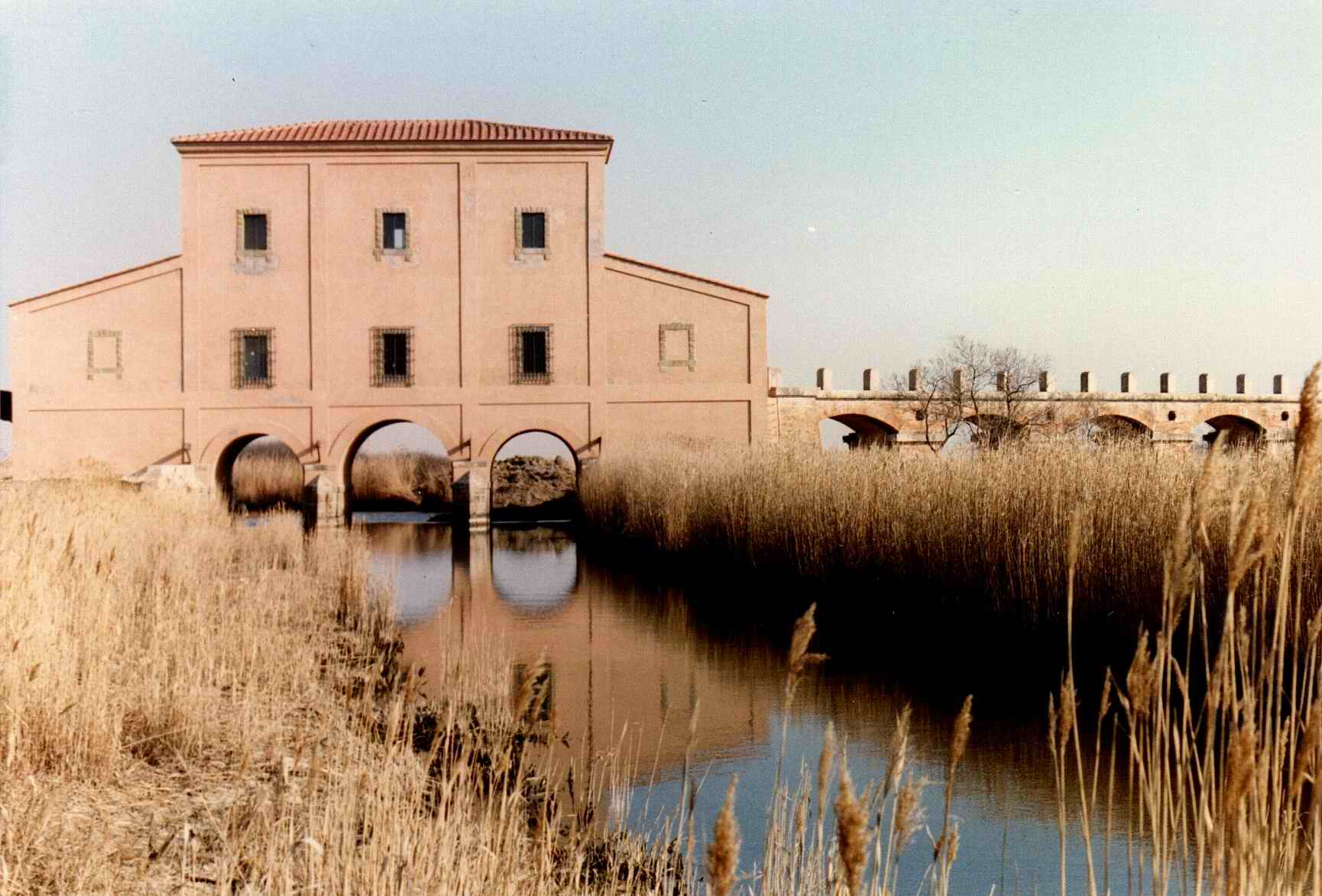

General information
- Type: Hydraulic structure
- Location: Via della Casa Rossa Ximenes Castiglione della Pescaia, Tuscany, Italy
- Coordinates: 42°46′7″N 10°54′5″E
- Construction started: 1767
- Completed: 1768

Design and construction
- Architect: Leonardo Ximenes

Casa Rossa Ximenes is a historic hydraulic building located in the municipality of Castiglione della Pescaia, Tuscany, Italy, at the western edge of the Diaccia Botrona Nature Reserve. Built in 1767 by the Jesuit engineer and mathematician Leonardo Ximenes during the reclamation of the Maremma wetlands, it was designed to regulate water flow between the former Lake Prile and the Tyrrhenian Sea. Today, the building houses a multimedia museum and serves as a visitor centre for the nature reserve.

== History ==
The building originally known as the fabbrica delle cataratte ("sluice works building"), later commonly referred to as the Casa Rossa Ximenes, was designed and built in 1767 by the Jesuit engineer and mathematician Leonardo Ximenes during the land reclamation works in the Maremma, commissioned by Grand Duke Peter Leopold of Habsburg-Lorraine. Its purpose was to regulate the flow of water between the marshes of Lake Castiglione (the ancient Lake Prile) and the Tyrrhenian Sea, reflecting contemporary beliefs that malaria was caused by noxious vapours arising from the mixing of freshwater and seawater.

The structure was renovated between 1833 and 1835, with modifications to the roof and the construction of a new bridge alongside the main complex.

After it lost its original hydraulic function, the building remained largely intact. It was subsequently restored through the initiative of the Province of Grosseto and repurposed as a visitor and information centre for the Diaccia Botrona Nature Reserve. In 2009, a multimedia museum was established inside the building, and since 2010 visitor services and educational activities have been managed on behalf of the provincial authority.

== Description ==
The Casa Rossa Ximenes retains both its internal and external spaces, including the original hydraulic infrastructure, such as sluices, gates, and mechanical components, which remain largely intact. Beneath the main structure is the sluice system designed by Ximenes to control water flow between the marsh and the sea.

The two-storey building houses a multimedia museum dedicated to the flora and fauna of the Diaccia Botrona Nature Reserve, the historical formation of the wetland, and the traditional activities once practiced in the area, including fishing, hunting, and the gathering of wild plants. Exhibits include traditional tools, interpretive panels, and scale models illustrating local ecosystems and the reserve's hydrological layout.

The museum also features interactive and accessible installations, including tactile displays and audio content for visually impaired visitors. From the Casa Rossa Ximenes, guided tours of the nature reserve can be arranged, including walking, cycling, and boat excursions, as well as birdwatching activities. The site is also used for cultural events, such as exhibitions, workshops, and performances.
