= Leonardo Ximenes =

Italian Jesuit, mathematician, engineer, astronomer and geographer

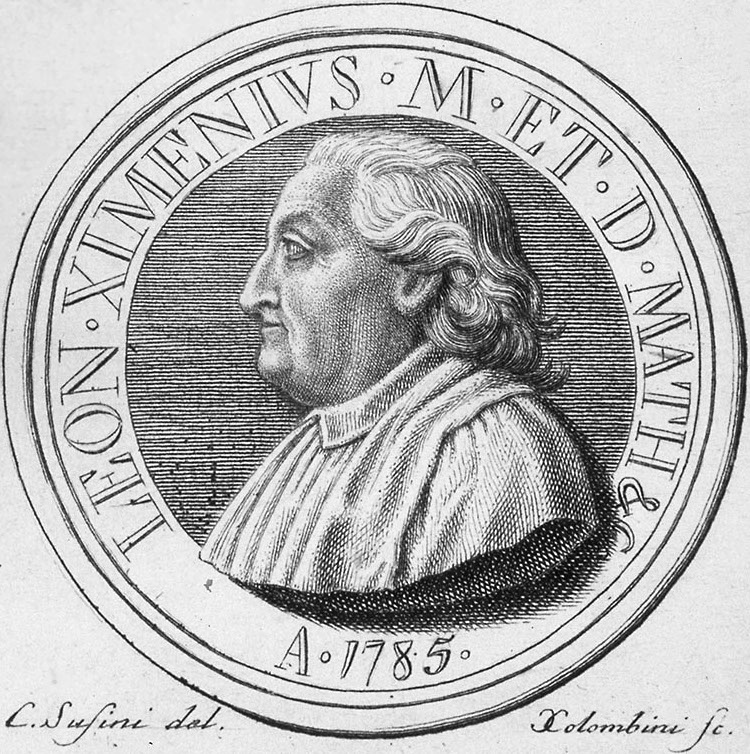
- Leonardo Ximenes
- Born: 27 December 1716; Trapani, Kingdom of Sicily
- Died: 3 May 1786 (aged 69); Florence, Grand Duchy of Tuscany
- Occupations: Jesuit priest; University teacher; Engineer; Astronomer
- Known for: having established the Osservatorio Ximeniano in Florence
- Parent(s): Giuseppe Ximenes and Tommasa Ximenes (née Corso)
- Scientific career
- Fields: Mathematics; Astronomy; Hydraulic engineering
- Workplaces: University of Florence

Leonardo Ximenes SJ (27 December 1716 – 3 May 1786) was a famous Italian Jesuit, mathematician, engineer, astronomer and geographer from Sicily.

After having attended a Jesuit school, he became a mathematician, a hydraulic and civil engineer, and was an eminently respected astronomer in his day. The astronomical observatory, Osservatorio Ximeniano in Florence, is named after him in recognition of his services to the field.

== Biography ==
Leonardo Ximenes was born in Trapani into a noble family of Spanish origin. As a boy, he was educated at the Jesuit school in his native town.

In 1731, he entered the Jesuit Order and continued to study at the school in Trapani, where he completed the curriculum. At the age of 20, he was sent to the Roman College to pursue advanced studies. Ordained at Trapani in 1743, at the age of 27, he returned to Rome and was then sent to Florence as a priest in training. In February 2, 1750, he professed the four vows, thus divesting himself of all his property, which he left in usufruct to his mother and his paternal uncle. Only after their deaths would it have gone to the Society, save an annual allowance of 40 onze for himself, which he posthumously donated to establish a chair of experimental physics at a Jesuit college.

The obscure Jesuit from Trapani entered the exclusive sphere of Florentine culture in 1748, when he began service as a math tutor for the sons of an important Florentine nobleman, the marchese Vincenzo Riccardi. In Florence Ximenes befriended the Tuscan scholar Giovanni Lami, editor of the journal Novelle letterarie (1740–70). In the spring of 1755, he presented a brief memorandum to Emmanuel de Nay, count of Richecourt (1697–1768), the prime minister of the Grand Duchy of Tuscany, concerning an ambitious project: measuring the variation in the obliquity of the ecliptic with the great gnomon in Santa Maria del Fiore. The document, preserved in the archives of the Opera del Duomo, bears in the margin the order to start work on the project immediately. That same year, on July 18, Ximenes sent the Grand Duke of Tuscany a memorandum asking to be appointed professor of Geography at the Florentine "studio", or university, and the administration was so efficient that, exactly three months after the request, he was appointed Reader in Geography to His Imperial Majesty with a salary of 700 lire (equivalent to that of a workman) and a grant of 9,000 lire to buy the instruments necessary for practicing his profession.

In Ximenes' day, one of the astronomical problems debated in scientific circles was how to measure the secular variation in the obliquity of the ecliptic. Its solution was thought to be a kind of benchmark for the new theory of gravity, since it could be calculated by taking into account the gravitational perturbation of Venus and the other planets. Like others who had studied the obliquity of the ecliptic without sufficiently precise instruments, Ximenes had to compare the modern measurements with the ancient ones. The result of his research, Del vecchio e nuovo Gnomone fiorentino (On the old and the new Florentine Gnomon, 1757), is considered his masterpiece.

The work was prodigious, consisting of nearly 400 printed pages, illustrated by copperplate engravings. It described the condition of the Florentine gnomon constructed by Paolo dal Pozzo Toscanelli in Santa Maria del Fiore, and gave all of its measurements, which, if they had ever been known, had been lost; more importantly, it scientifically justified the need for a new gnomon. So convincing were Ximenes' reasons that the politicians of the time and the Opera del Duomo financed the construction of this instrument, which was completed in a remarkably short time.

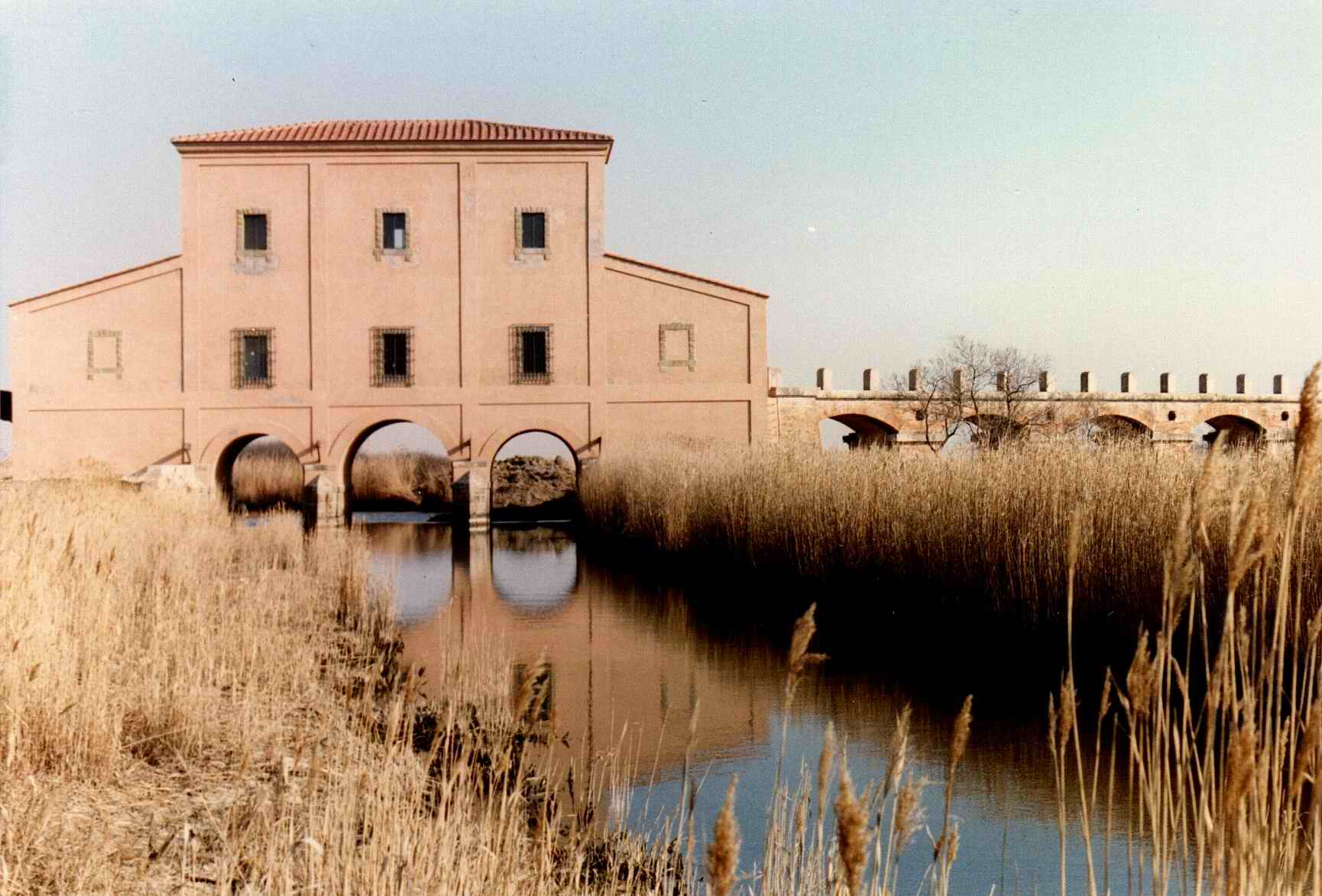
The Casa Rossa, built in 1767 by Ximenes to regulate water flow between the former Lake Prile and the Tyrrhenian Sea

Ximenes worked also as a hydraulic engineer for the Grand Duchy. He is known for building canals, including the Imperial Canal situated nearby to the locality Dogana di Tiglio and the hamlet Caccialupi in Tuscany. These canals were part of an effort to drain the Lago di Bientina, at the time the largest lake in Tuscany. In 1756 Ximenes founded an observatory in the Collegio di S. Giovannino in Florence. The observatory was the first to be established in Florence and the first in Italy to be set up in a Jesuit college. Upon the temporary suppression of the Society of Jesus in 1773, the laboratory was entrusted to the Scolopi fathers, with whom Ximenes continued working.

Ximenes died in Florence on 3 May 1786. He was a member of the Russian Academy of Sciences, the Accademia delle Arti del Disegno, and the Accademia dei Fisiocritici, and a correspondent of the Académie des sciences of Paris. Ximenes was among the founding members of the Italian National Academy of Sciences.

Ximenes had various scientific disputes with his fellow Jesuit Roger Joseph Boscovich. Relations between the two got gradually worse especially after the case about the water of Lake Bientina which, at the end of the 1750s, led the two Jesuits to oppose each other in front of the Emperor in Vienna.

== Works ==
Del vecchio e nuovo Gnomone fiorentino, Florence, 1757

- Notizia de' tempi de' principali fenomeni del cielo nuovamente calcolati secondo le ultime tavole cassiniane per l'anno 1753 (in Italian). Firenze: Pietro Gaetano Viviani. 1752.
- Notizia de' tempi de' principali fenomeni del cielo nuovamente calcolati secondo le ultime tavole cassiniane per l'anno 1754 (in Italian). Firenze: Pietro Gaetano Viviani. 1753.
- Dissertatio de maris aestu, ac praesertim de viribus lunae, solisque mare moventibus (in Latin). Firenze: Pietro Gaetano Viviani. 1755.
- Del vecchio e nuovo gnomone fiorentino e delle osservazioni astronomiche fisiche ed architettoniche fatte nel verificarne la costruzione (in Italian). Firenze: Stamperia Imperiale. 1757.
- Dissertazione intorno alle osservazioni solstiziali del 1775 allo gnomone della metropolitana fiorentina (in Italian). Livorno: Giovanni Vincenzo Falorni. 1776.
- Ximenes, Leonardo (1780). Nuove sperienze idrauliche fatte ne' canali, e ne' fiumi per verificare le principali leggi e fenomeni delle acque correnti dell'abate Leonardo Ximenes ... In Siena: nella stamperia di Luigi, e Benedetto Bindi.
- Teoria e pratica delle resistenze de' solidi ne' loro attriti (in Italian). Vol. 1. Pisa: Samuel Fuà. 1782.
- Teoria e pratica delle resistenze de' solidi ne' loro attriti (in Italian). Firenze: Pietro Allegrini. 1782.

== See also ==
- Casa Rossa Ximenes
- Osservatorio Ximeniano
