= San Leopoldo massacre =

1944 Nazi massacre in Tuscany, Italy

Coordinates: 42°44′56.3″N 10°58′42″E

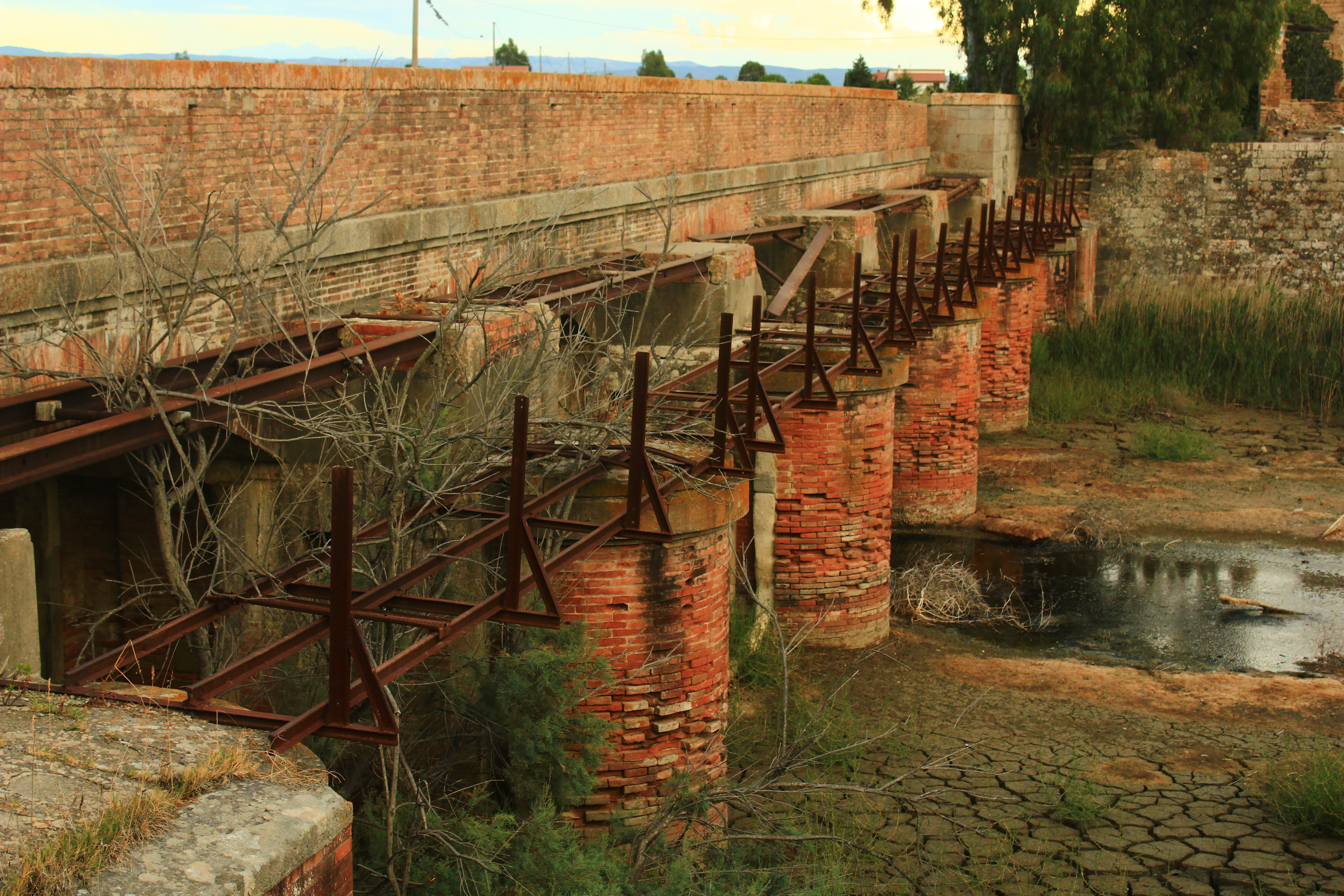
- The San Leopoldo bridge
- Location: San Leopoldo, near Marina di Grosseto, Tuscany, Italy
- Date: 12 June 1944
- Target: Italian civilians
- Attack type: Mass shooting
- Deaths: 6
- Perpetrator: Grenadier Regiments 1059, 92nd Infantry Division (LXXV Army Corps)

The San Leopoldo massacre (Italian: Strage di San Leopoldo) was a killing of Italian civilians by German troops on 12 June 1944 near Marina di Grosseto, in Tuscany, central Italy, during the final phase of the German retreat along the Tyrrhenian coast in World War II.

== Background ==
Following the Allied landing in mainland Italy and the liberation of Rome, German forces began a strategic withdrawal northwards, establishing defensive positions along the Gothic Line. During this retreat, the German command ordered widespread evacuations of coastal areas for military security purposes and carried out reprisals against suspected partisan activity and civilians remaining in restricted zones.

Prior to the events at San Leopoldo, German forces carried out a series of security sweeps in the Castiglione della Pescaia area, with the aim of disrupting local Resistance activity and isolating partisan groups, including the so-called "Tirli" formation. A small partisan group had been formed in Marina di Grosseto in September 1943 under the command of Captain Mario Venturini. However, armed activity in the coastal zone remained limited.

== Massacre ==
On the morning of 12 June 1944, a small German detachment of the 92nd Infantry Division of the LXXV Army Corps arrived at the San Leopoldo bridge with the task of mining and demolishing infrastructure. Three soldiers reportedly entered the area around the hydraulic station, where the family of Fortunato Falzini resided.

Also present were displaced civilians from the Lari family and nearby members of the Botarelli household. The German soldiers ordered evacuation despite the presence of prior authorisations allowing residence for water-level monitoring duties.

According to the 1945 reconstruction of the prefect Amato Mati, the situation escalated into violence. German troops opened fire, killing Fortunato Falzini and Giuseppe and Livio Botarelli (father and son). Following the initial shootings, other civilians attempted to flee along the embankment and were also hit. Olga Lari and her son Giancarlo Lari were killed on the spot, while Roma Madioni was severely wounded and died a few days later. Armando Lari survived after hiding in an underground opening.

== Victims ==
The victims of the massacre were six Italian civilians.

- Livio Botarelli (born 11 July 1927 in Foiano della Chiana), resident at San Leopoldo.
- Luigi Botarelli (born 23 January 1891 in Foiano della Chiana), resident at San Leopoldo and father of Livio Botarelli
- Fortunato Falzini (born 20 February 1904 in Castiglione della Pescaia), resident at San Leopoldo, employed in the area of the hydraulic works.
- Giancarlo Lari (born 16 October 1926 in Pietrasanta), resident of Marina di Grosseto, member of the family of displaced civilians present at the site.
- Olga Lari (aged 46), mother of Giancarlo Lari and member of a displaced civilian family sheltering at San Leopoldo.
- Roma Madioni (aged 43), relative by marriage of the Lari family.

== Aftermath ==
The victims were buried locally and the wounded were treated in Grosseto. The perpetrators were never officially identified. Post-war investigations produced differing accounts of the event, and no judicial proceedings resulted in convictions. Claims of potential Fascist involvement, mentioned in some local accounts, were never confirmed in subsequent judicial investigations.

A memorial plaque listing the names of the victims is located near the skating rink in Marina di Grosseto. At the original site of the massacre in San Leopoldo, a commemorative stone bearing the victims' names was installed on 12 June 2012. An official commemoration ceremony is held annually on 12 June at the San Leopoldo canal, attended by local authorities and community representatives from Grosseto in remembrance of the six victims.

== Sources ==
- Fulvetti, Gianluca (2009). Uccidere i civili. Le stragi nazifasciste in Toscana (1943-1944). Rome: Carocci. pp. 95–96.
- Grilli, Marco (June 2015). "12 giugno 1944: la strage di San Leopoldo". ToscanaNovecento.
