= Santa Colomba, Bientina =

Santa Colomba
- Frazione
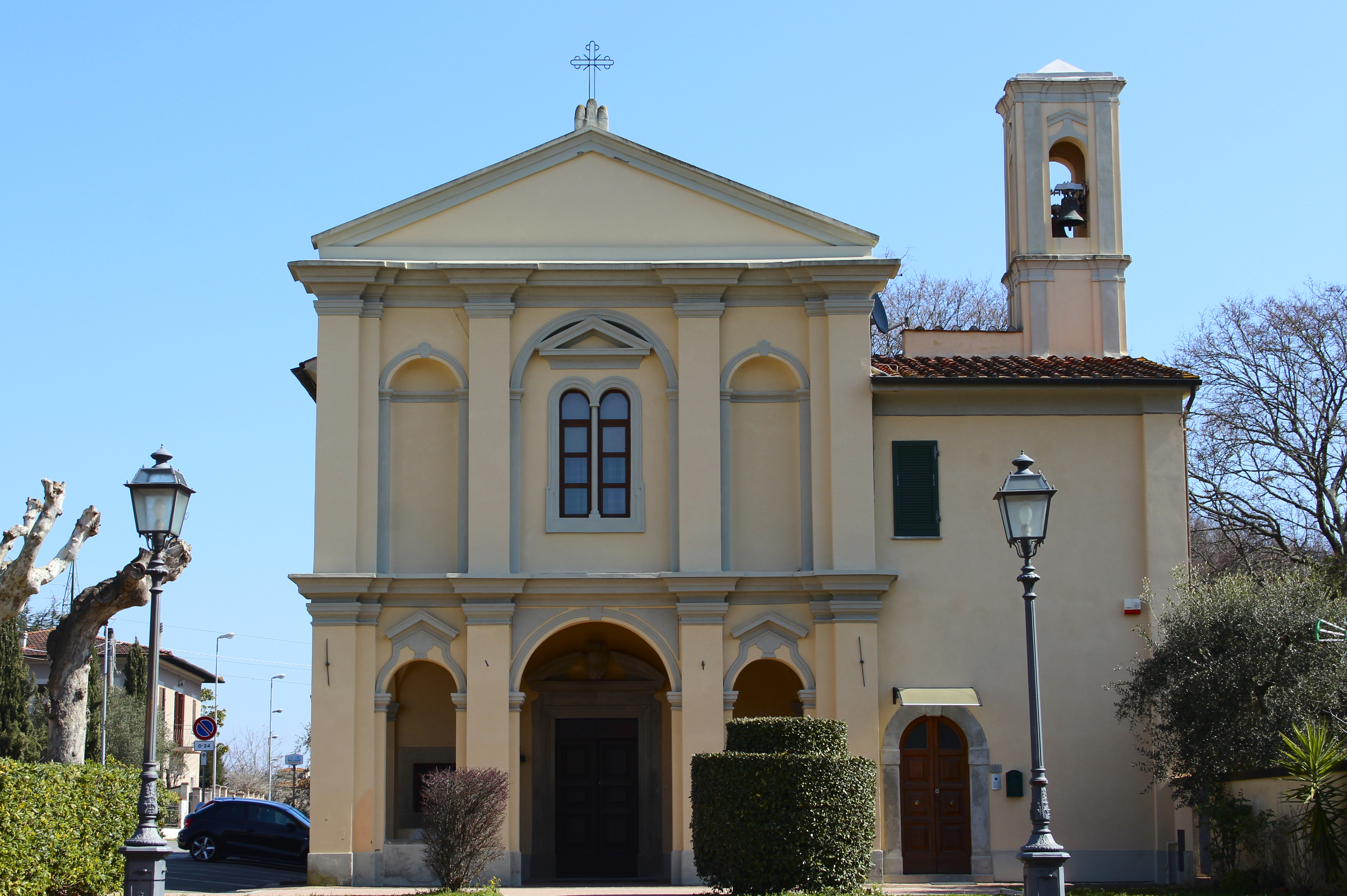
- The church of Madonna del Bosco

- Location of Santa Colomba in Italy
- Coordinates: 43°41′42″N 10°38′49″E
- Country: Italy
- Region: Tuscany
- Province: Pisa (PI)
- Comune: Bientina
- Elevation: 62 m (203 ft)

Population (2011)
  - Total: 433
- Time zone: UTC+1 (CET)
  - Summer (DST): UTC+2 (CEST)
- Postal code: 56031
- Dialing code: (+39) 0587

Santa Colomba is a village in Tuscany, central Italy, administratively a frazione of the comune of Bientina, province of Pisa. At the time of the 2001 census its population was 277.

Santa Colomba is about 25 km from Pisa and 3 km from Bientina.
