= Puntone, Bientina =

Puntone
- Frazione
- Location of Puntone in Italy
- Coordinates: 43°44′7″N 10°38′34″E
- Country: Italy
- Region: Tuscany
- Province: Pisa (PI)
- Comune: Bientina
- Elevation: 8 m (26 ft)

Population (2011)
  - Total: 213
- Time zone: UTC+1 (CET)
  - Summer (DST): UTC+2 (CEST)
- Postal code: 56031
- Dialing code: (+39) 0587

Puntone is a village in Tuscany, central Italy, administratively a frazione of the comune of Bientina, province of Pisa. At the time of the 2001 census its population was 124.

Puntone is about 25 km from Pisa and 4 km from Bientina.
