= Quattro Strade, Bientina =

Quattro Strade
- Frazione
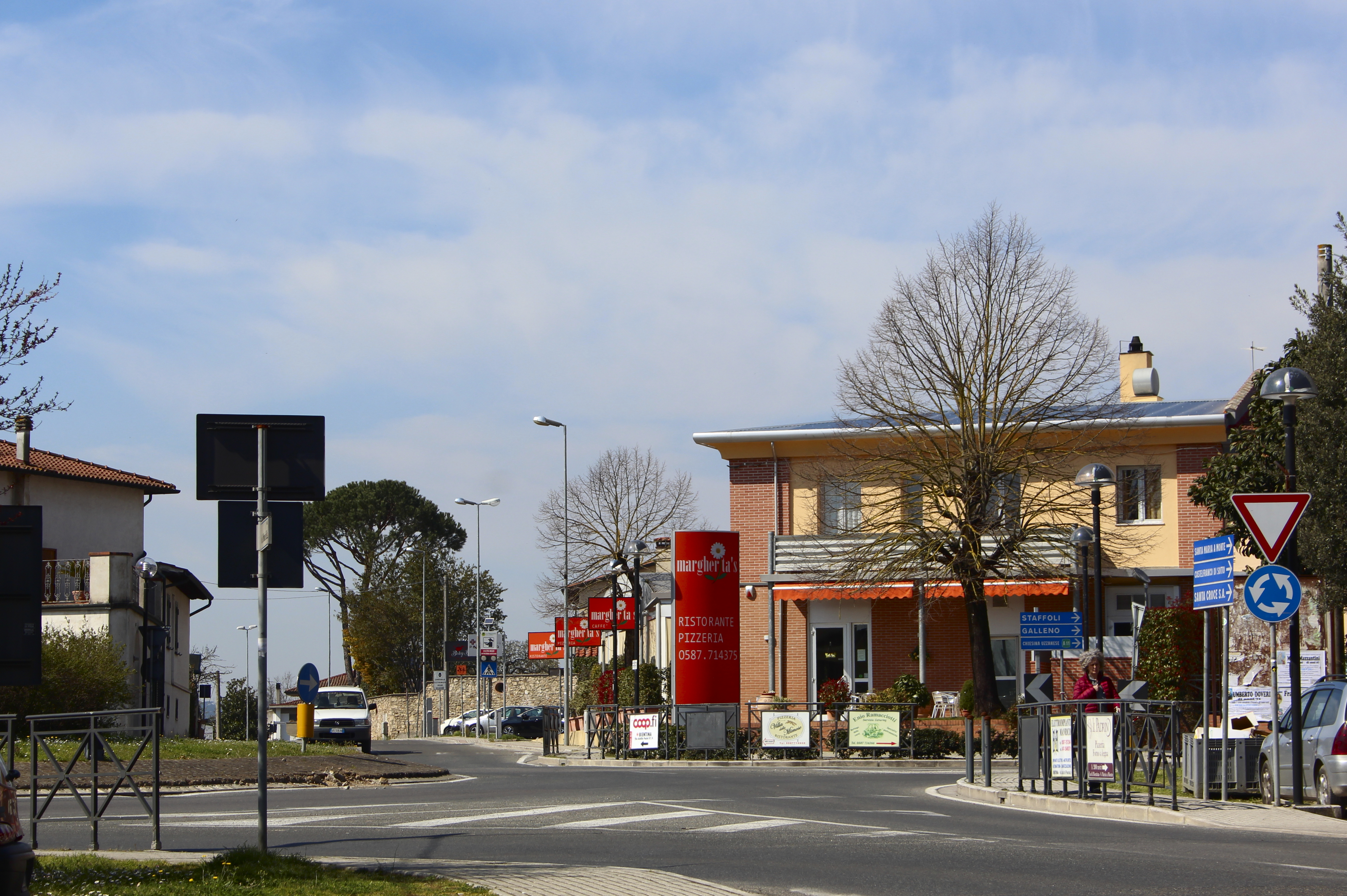

- Location of Quattro Strade in Italy
- Coordinates: 43°42′33″N 10°39′29″E
- Country: Italy
- Region: Tuscany
- Province: Pisa (PI)
- Comune: Bientina
- Elevation: 55 m (180 ft)

Population (2011)
  - Total: 1,338
- Time zone: UTC+1 (CET)
  - Summer (DST): UTC+2 (CEST)
- Postal code: 56031
- Dialing code: (+39) 0587

Quattro Strade is a village in Tuscany, central Italy, administratively a frazione of the comune of Bientina, province of Pisa. At the time of the 2001 census its population was 959.

Quattro Strade is about 26 km from Pisa and 4 km from Bientina.
