= San Leopoldo Canal =

Canal in Grosseto, Tuscany, Italy

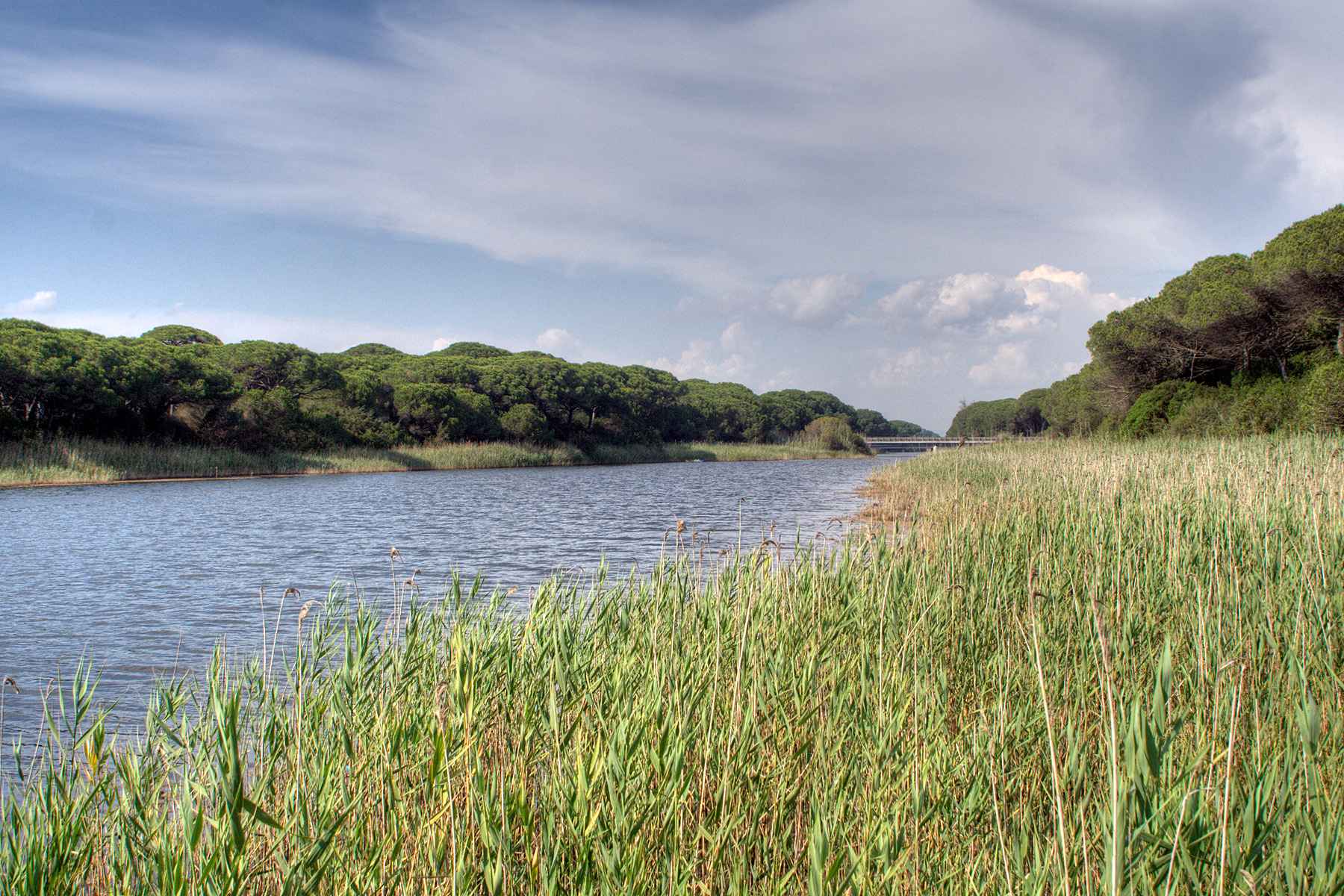

Location
- Country: Italy
- Region: Tuscany
- Municipality: Grosseto

Physical characteristics
- Source
  - location: San Leopoldo, Grosseto
  - coordinates: 42.753154568°N 10.981710358°E
- Mouth: Tyrrhenian Sea (regulated outlet)
  - location: North of Marina di Grosseto
  - coordinates: 42.731157738°N 10.963454226°E
- Length: 3 km

The San Leopoldo Canal (Italian: Canale emissario di San Leopoldo), also known locally as the Fiumara, is an artificial watercourse in the municipality of Grosseto, Tuscany, central Italy.

== History ==
The canal was excavated following a 1828 decree by Grand Duke Leopold II of Tuscany as part of large-scale land reclamation works of the former Lake Prile marshland. The engineering works were directed by Alessandro Manetti, Federico Capei, and Giacomo Grandoni, and included the construction of a system of drainage canals intended to discharge reclaimed waters into the Tyrrhenian Sea.

The San Leopoldo Canal was completed in 1834 and later modified during the late 19th century. It underwent further restructuring during the 20th-century land reclamation campaigns.

During World War II, the area of San Leopoldo became the site of the 12 June 1944 massacre of six Italian civilians by Nazi troops during the German retreat through Tuscany. One of the bridges over the canal was also destroyed and later rebuilt after the war.

== Course ==
The canal originates in the inland reclamation area of the Grosseto plain and flows south-west towards the Tyrrhenian Sea. It collects waters from minor drainage channels and passes through the reclaimed agricultural landscape before reaching the coastal pine forest system (pineta del Tombolo).

Near the coast, the canal passes under the historic San Leopoldo sluice bridge and the provincial road's bridge linking Grosseto with Castiglione della Pescaia. Near the old bridge, beside the former hydraulic control station, there is a commemorative stone with an inscription in memory of the 1944 massacre.

Its lower course forms part of a protected wetland environment included in the San Felice reserve of the World Wildlife Fund.

The outlet to the sea, near the Fiumara beach north of Marina di Grosseto, is regulated by seasonal sand barriers maintained by the local reclamation consortium, creating a temporary lagoon-like environment that periodically opens into the Tyrrhenian Sea.

== Sources ==
- Chelazzi, Lorenzo; Colombini, Isabella; Fallaci, Mario; Gagnarli, Elena (2008). La memoria dell'acqua nella pianura grossetana (PDF). Florence: CNR.
- Fulvetti, Gianluca (2009). Uccidere i civili: le stragi naziste in Toscana. Rome: Carocci.
- Guerrini, Giuseppe (1989). Da San Rocco a Marina di Grosseto. 1789–1989. Pisa: Pacini.
- Innocenti, Mario; Innocenti, Stefano (1999). Marina di Grosseto. Grosseto: Innocenti.
- Simoncelli, Antonio Valentino (2008). Bonifiche nel Grossetano. Arcidosso: Effigi.
- Simoncelli, Antonio Valentino (2016). Cronache maremmane dalla fine del '700 a oggi. Grosseto: Innocenti.
