= Bientina =

- Comune
- Comune di Bientina
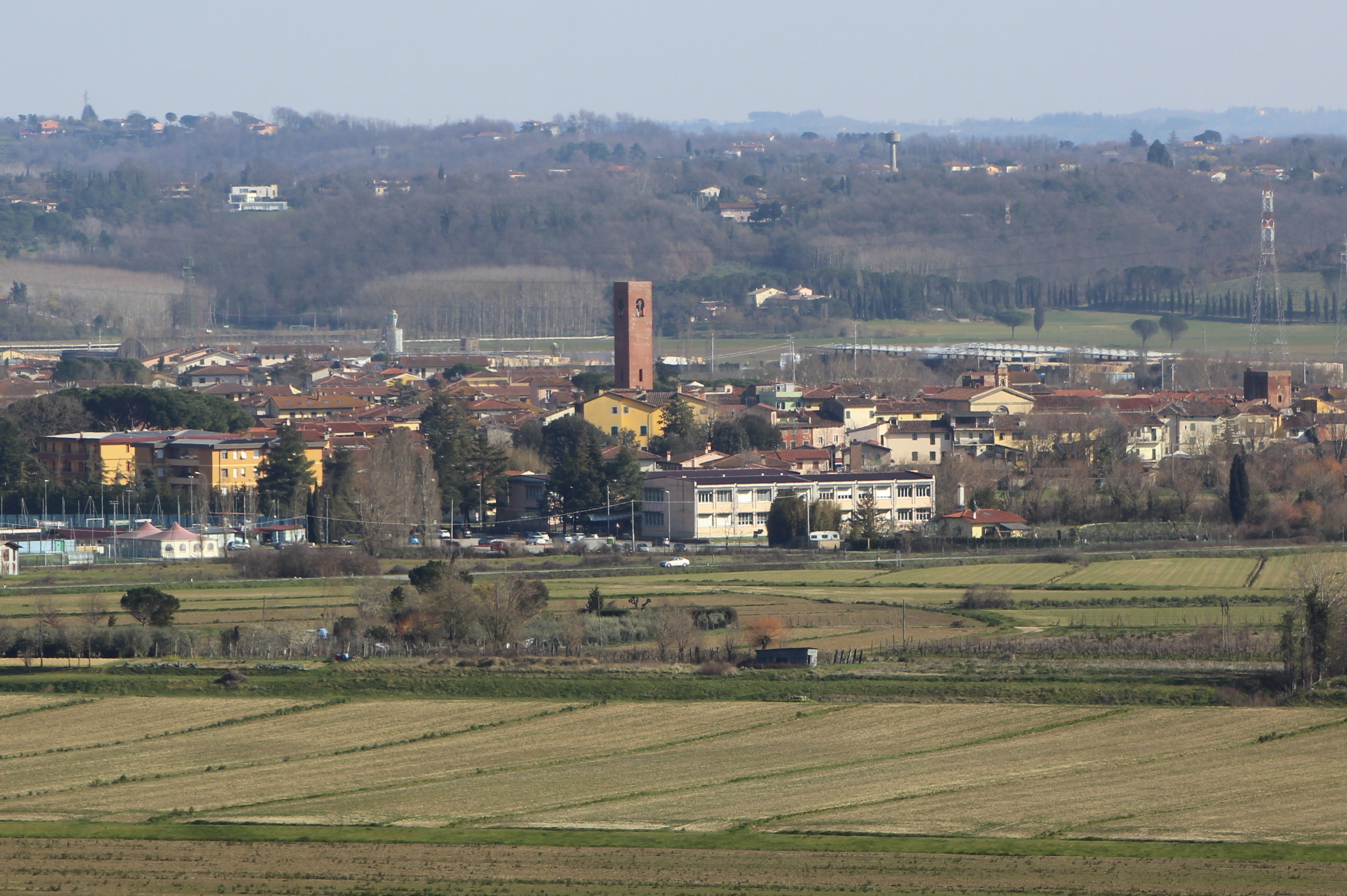

- Coat of arms

- Location within Italy Location within Tuscany
- Coordinates: 43°43′N 10°37′E
- Country: Italy
- Region: Tuscany
- Province: Pisa (PI)
- Frazioni: Caccialupi, Puntone, Quattro Strade, Santa Colomba

Government
  - Mayor: Dario Carmassi

Area
  - Total: 29.48 km^{2} (11.38 sq mi)
- Elevation: 10 m (33 ft)

Population (31 March 2017)
  - Total: 8,285
  - Density: 281.0/km^{2} (727.9/sq mi)
- Demonym: Bientinesi
- Time zone: UTC+1 (CET)
  - Summer (DST): UTC+2 (CEST)
- Postal code: 56031
- Dialing code: 0587
- Patron saint: St. Valentine
- Saint day: June 5
- Website: Official website

Bientina (Italian: [ˈbjɛntina]) is a comune (municipality) in the Province of Pisa in the Italian region Tuscany.

== History ==
The toponym Bientina is attested the first time in 793 as Blentina and probably comes from the Etruscan name Plitine.

== Geography ==
Location of the municipality (Comune) of Bientina (province of Pisa)

=== Territory ===
Bientina is located between Lucca's plain (Piana di Lucca) and the Valdarno.

It is about 50 kilometres (31 mi) to the west of Florence and about 15 kilometres (9 mi) east of Pisa and it borders the following municipalities: Altopascio, Buti, Calcinaia, Capannori, Castelfranco di Sotto, Santa Maria a Monte, Vicopisano.

To the north of the town there was once the largest lake in Tuscany, the Lago di Bientina, until it was drained in 1859 and converted to farmland.

The municipality is formed by the municipal seat of Bientina and the villages (frazioni) of Caccialupi, Puntone, Quattro Strade and Santa Colomba.

=== Climate ===
Bientina experiences a Mediterranean Climate like other cities in Central Italy.

Being more distant from the sea, winters are usually less mild than Pisa and summers are warmer.

The climatic classification is "Zone D, 1856 GR/G"

== Main sights ==
=== Religious architecture ===
- San Domenico (1621): church
- Santa Maria Assunta (medieval - church expanded and renovated in the mid-1600)
- Madonna del Bosco in Santa Colomba: church
- Oratory of San Girolamo (1640), home to the museum of ancient history of Bientina
- Oratory of San Pietro and Rocco (17th century)
- Oratory of San Giusto, the first church of Bientina (12th century)

=== Civil architecture ===
- Palazzo Pancani
- La Mora tower (13th century)
- Torre Civica (Torre del Frantoio) (13th century) - center of cultural activity.
- Torre del Giglio (13th century)
- Loggetta del Palazzo Comunale (17th century)
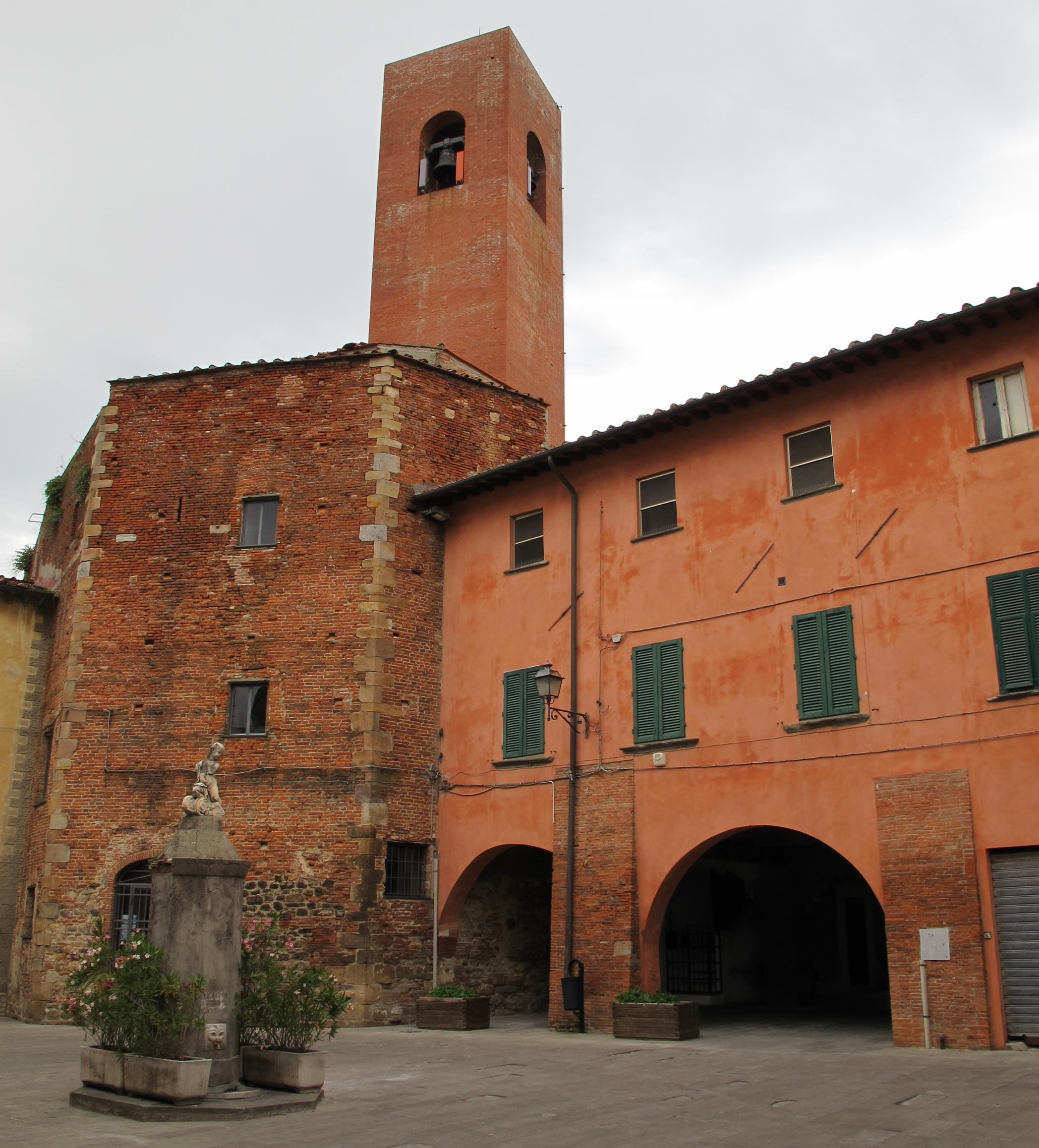
Church of San Domenico

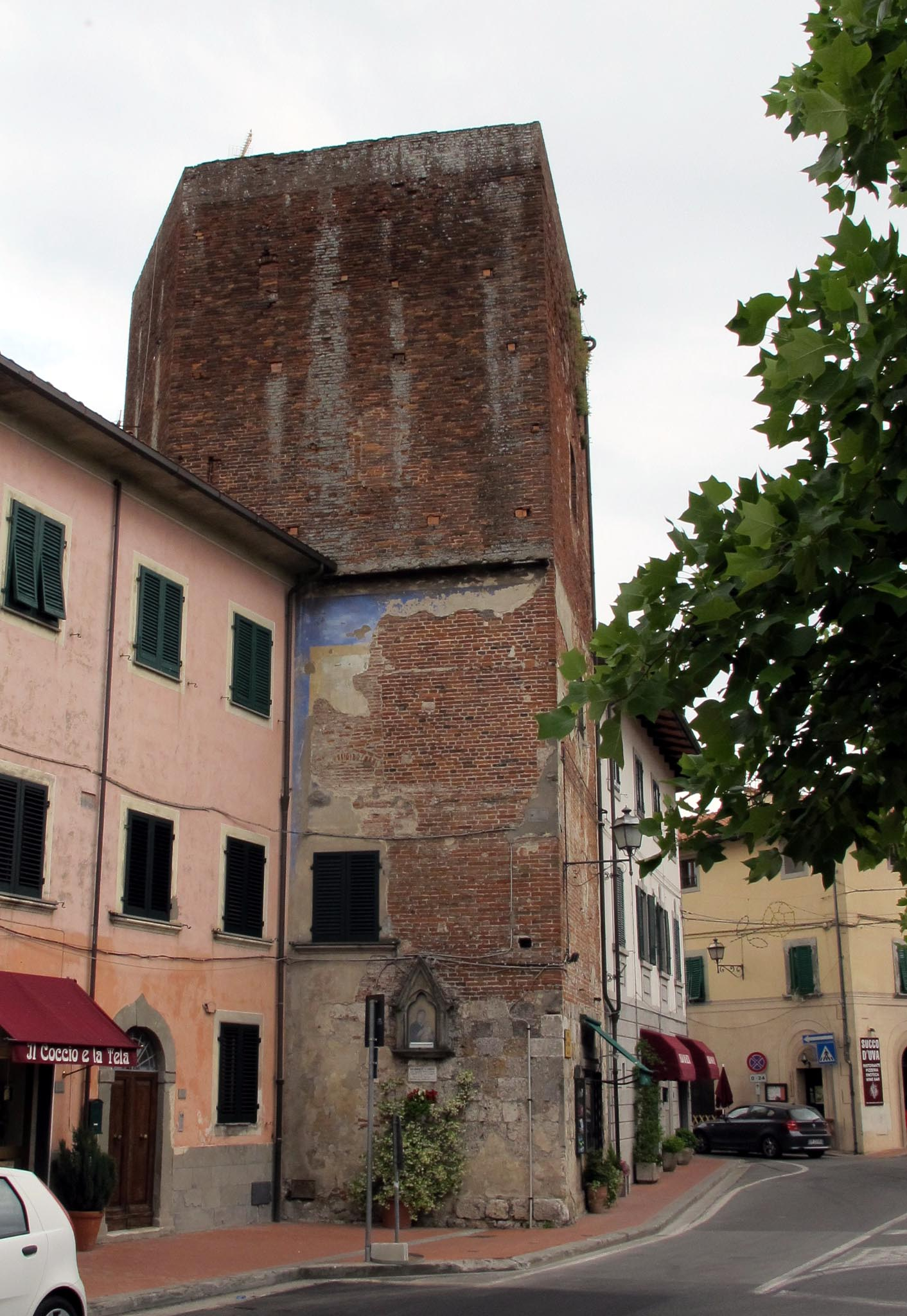
La Mora tower

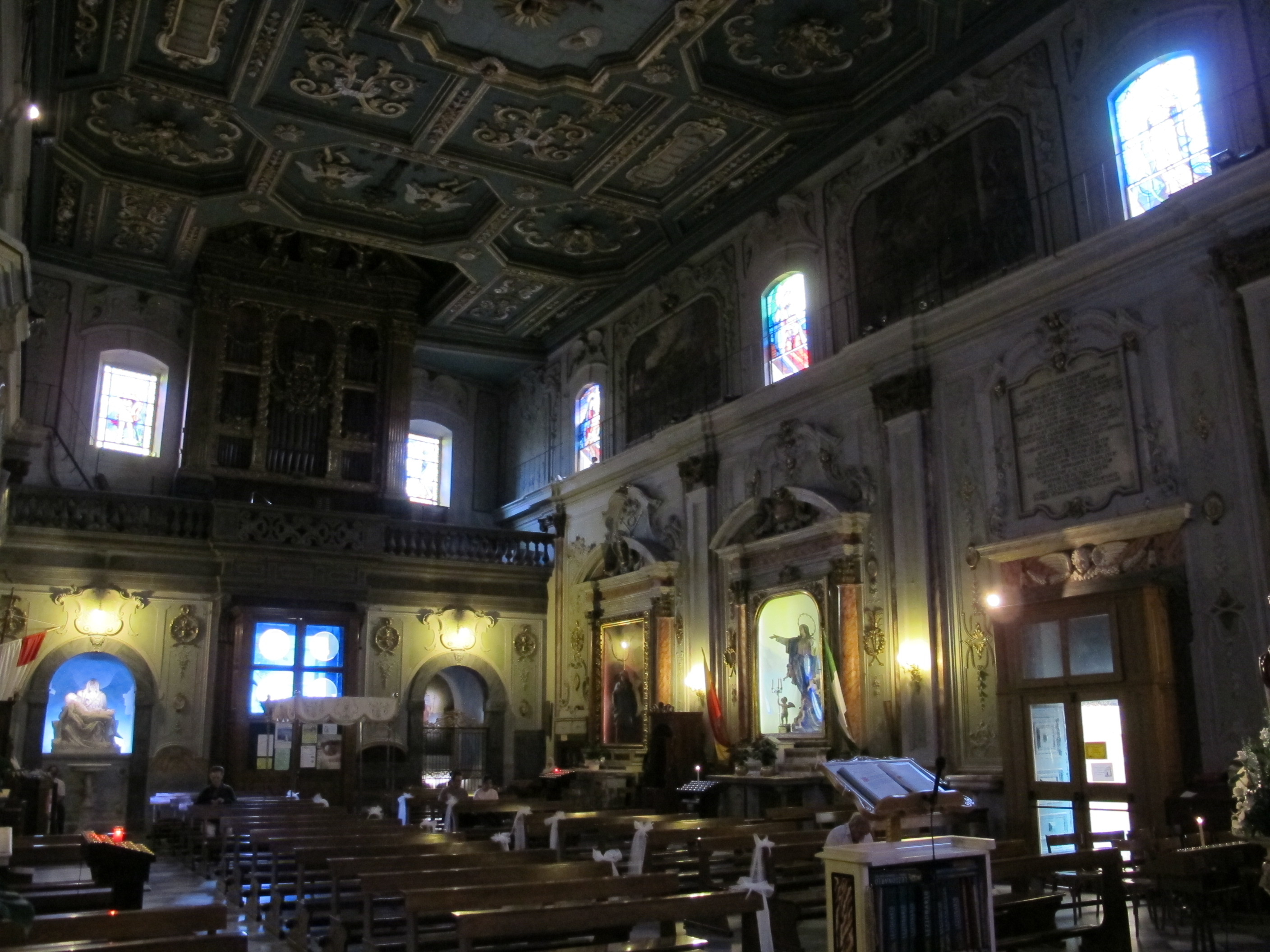
Church of Santa Maria Assunta

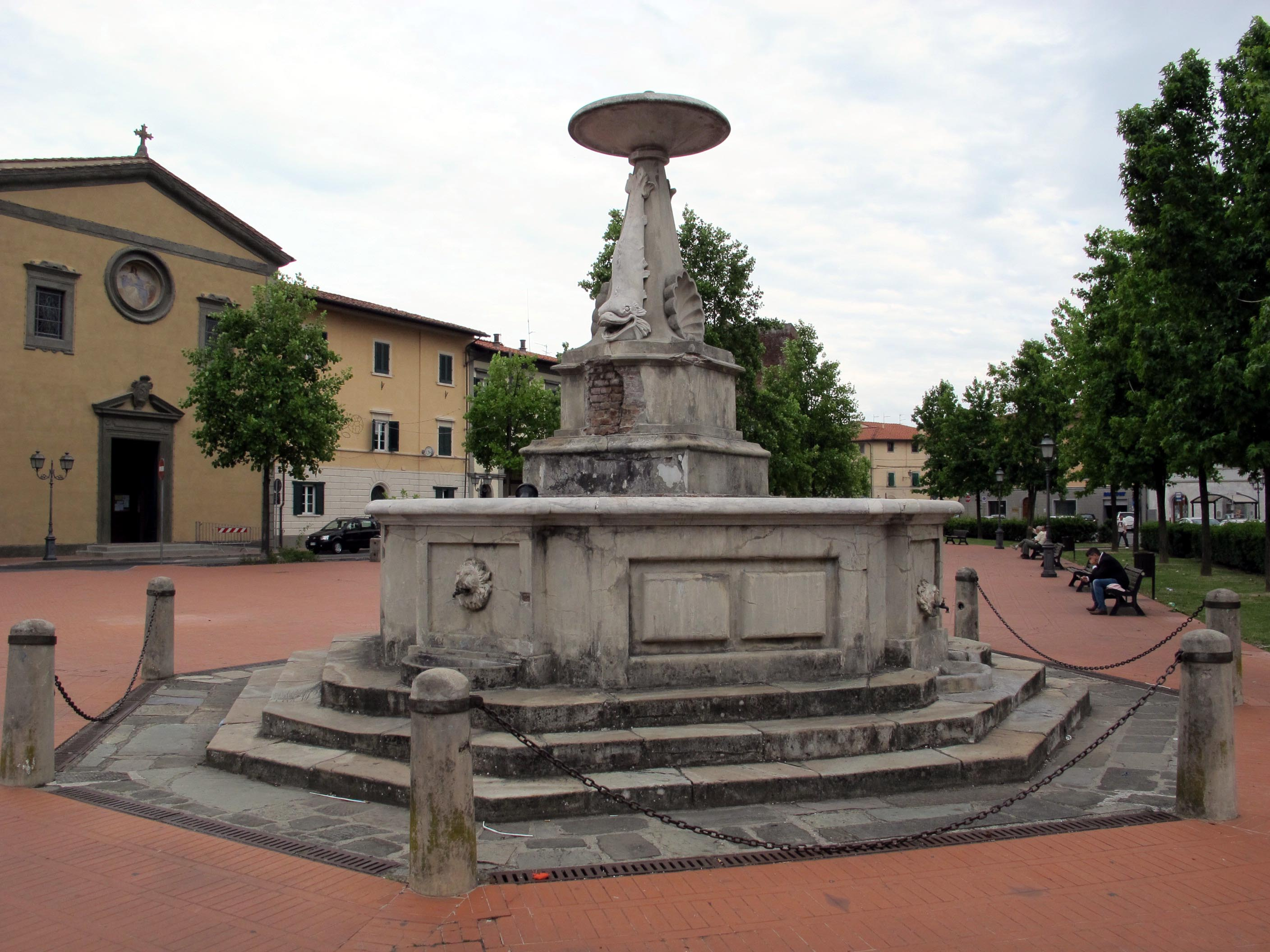
Fountain in Piazza Vittorio Emanuele

== Transport ==
=== Roads ===
Bientina is crossed by the Strada provinciale 439 Sarzanese Valdera and some secondary roads. Public transportation is performed by the company CTT Nord.

=== Trains ===
Until 1944 the town also had a train station along the former railway Lucca-Pontedera; the dilapidated building is still visible along the main road 25.

== Notable people ==
- Aldo Puccinelli
- Gaetano Polidori
- John Polidori
- Enrico Rossi

== International relations ==
Bientina is twinned with (France) Saint-Rémy-de-Provence since 1997
