= Santa Maria Assunta, Bientina =

Roman Catholic church in Bientina, Italy

Coordinates: 43.71030°N 10.61960°E

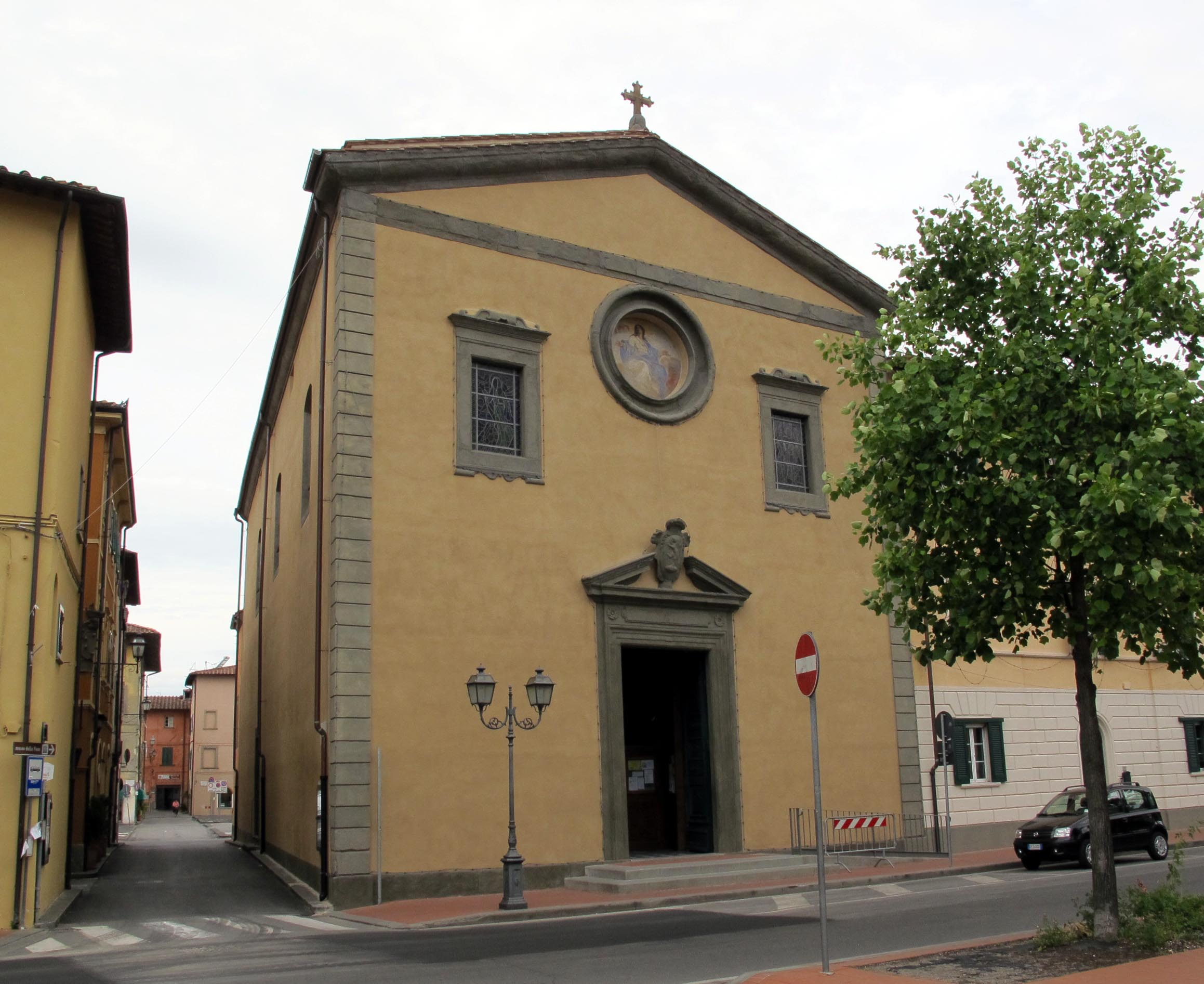
Facade of church

Santa Maria Assunta is the Roman Catholic church, located on Piazza Vittorio Emanuele in the town of Bientina in the province of Pisa, Tuscany, Italy. The church is near the city hall of the town.

== History ==
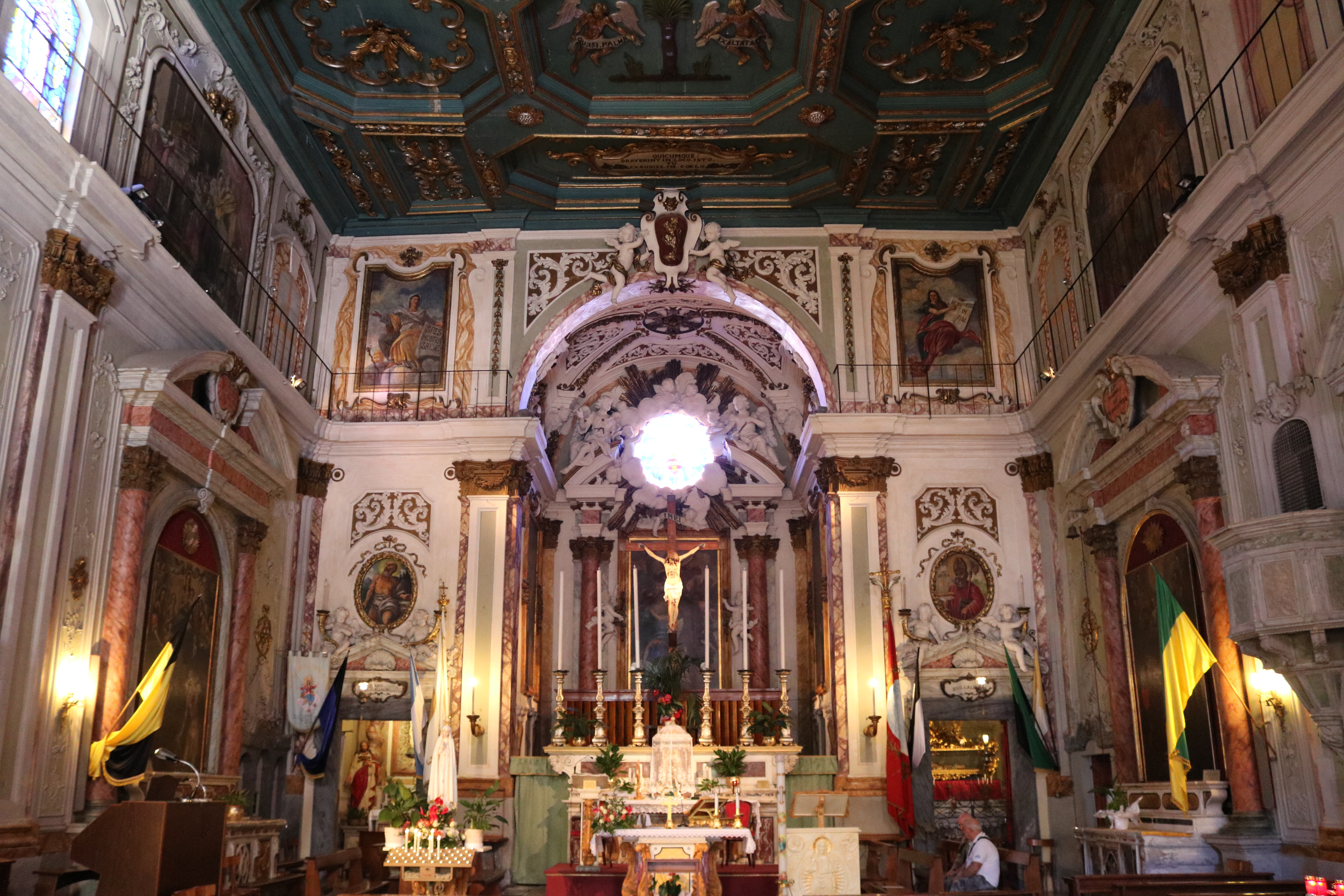
Interior of church towards the main altar

This church from the exterior looks plain. The initial church is documented since 1326, when it was listed as a pieve in a list in Calcinaia. In 1332, the archbishop Simone Saltarelli granted it a baptismal font. According to a plaque in the church, initially the church was doted with relics of the apostle St Barnabas, St Blaise, and Sainte M. Catherine Martyr. In 1628, reconstruction enlarged the parish and archbishop Silvani consecrated a new church on 10 April 1644. However a major impetus for its refurbishment was the translation on 6 June 1699 of relics of Saint Valentine the martyr (patron of Bientina), and thus becoming a goal of pilgrims seeking the saint's aide. They were moved here from the Catacomb of Callixtus in Rome.

Major refurbishments were begun in 1750, with the addition of the gilded and engraved wooden ceiling; in 1777, the walls had rococo stucco-work, and another major refurbishment was pursued in 1829. The interior is decorated with canvases from the 17th and 18th centuries. A recent restoration of the church took place in 1986. Attached to the church is a museum of Sacred Art displaying both robes and precious works from the church.

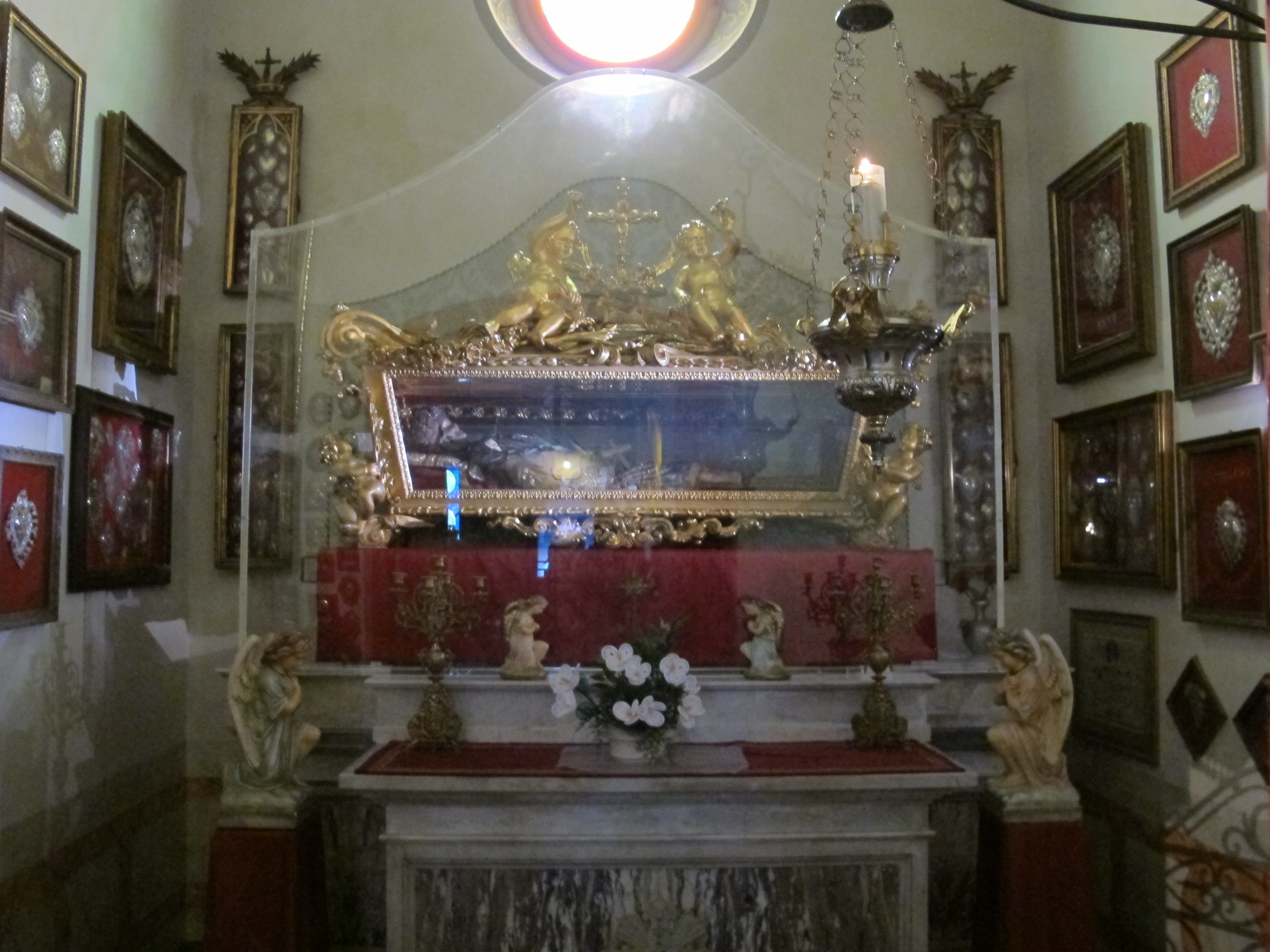
Reliquary of St Valentine, surrounded by silver donations

The main altarpiece depicting the Glory of St Valentine is attributed to Pier Dandini. An altarpiece depicting the Adoration of the Nave of Christ is attributed to Cesare Dandini.
