= Caccialupi =

- Frazione
- Location of Caccialupi in Italy
- Coordinates: 43°45′14″N 10°37′9″E
- Country: Italy
- Region: Tuscany
- Province: Pisa (PI)
- Comune: Bientina
- Elevation: 20 m (66 ft)

Population (2011)
  - Total: 14
- Time zone: UTC+1 (CET)
  - Summer (DST): UTC+2 (CEST)
- Postal code: 56031
- Dialing code: (+39) 0587

Caccialupi is a village in Tuscany, central Italy, administratively a frazione of the comune of Bientina, province of Pisa. At the time of the 2001 census its population was 26.

Caccialupi is about 25 km (16 mi) from Pisa and 6 km (3.7 mi) from Bientina.
