= Diaccia Botrona Nature Reserve =

Protected area in Tuscany, Italy

- Riserva naturale Diaccia Botrona
- IUCN category IV (habitat/species management area)
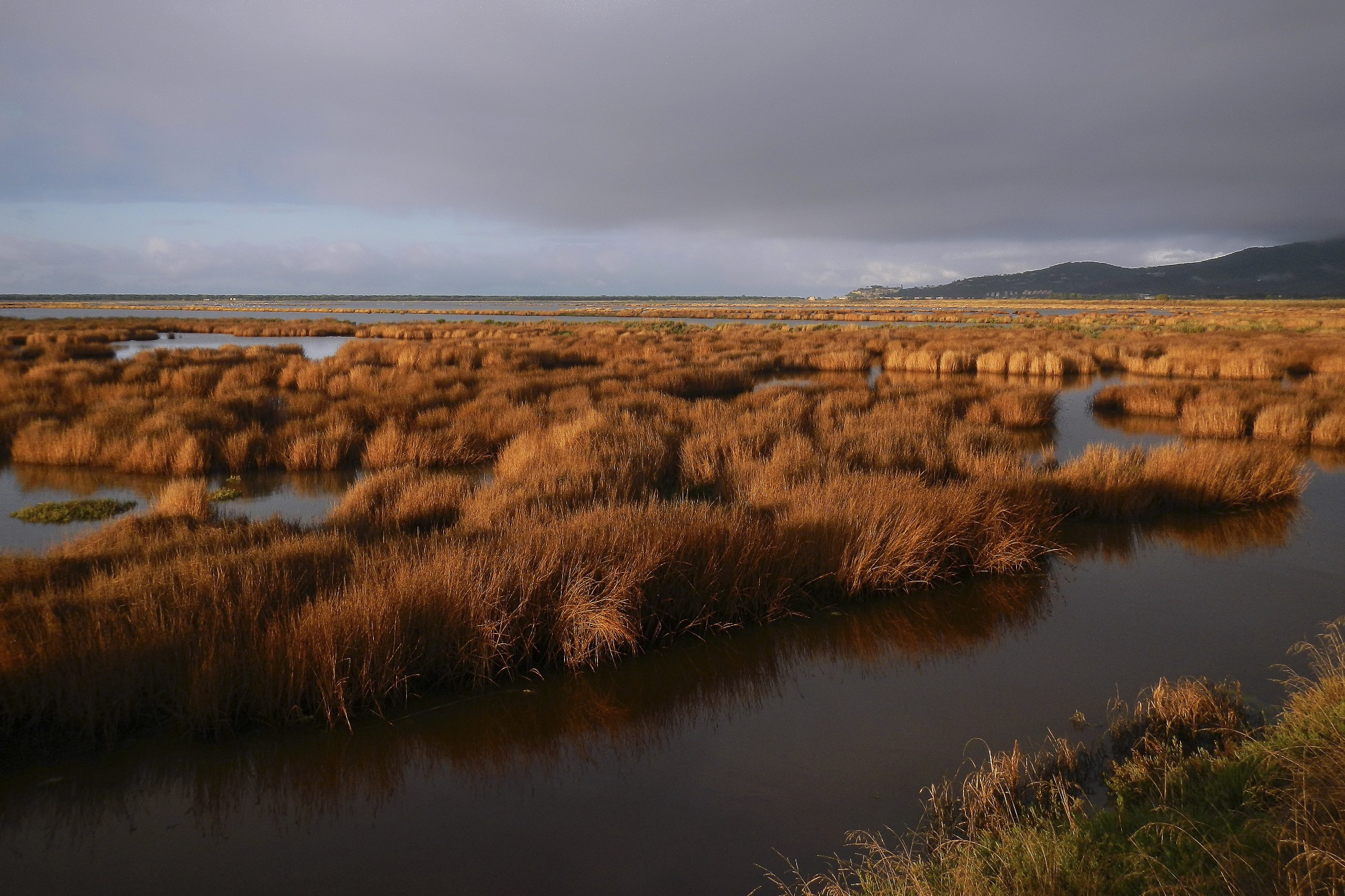

- Location within Italy
- Location: Province of Grosseto, Tuscany, Italy
- Nearest city: Grosseto; Castiglione della Pescaia
- Coordinates: 42°46′N 10°56′E
- Area: 1,347 ha (3,330 acres)
- Established: 27 February 1996; 30 years ago
- Governing body: Province of Grosseto

Ramsar Wetland
- Official name: Palude della Diaccia Botrona
- Designated: 22 May 1991
- Reference no.: 522

The Diaccia Botrona Nature Reserve is a protected wetland area located in the Maremma plain between Grosseto and Castiglione della Pescaia, in Tuscany. It preserves part of the former Lake Prile (Lacus Prelius), a large historic lake that was largely drained during reclamation works initiated by the Habsburg-Lorraine rulers in the 18th century.

The area was designated a wetland of international importance under the Ramsar Convention on 22 May 1991. It was subsequently established as a nature reserve by the Province of Grosseto through Provincial Council Resolution no. 17 of 27 February 1996, pursuant to Regional Law no. 49/1995. The protected area lies within the municipalities of Castiglione della Pescaia (33.77%) and Grosseto (66.23%). It is registered under ministerial code EUAP0387 and regional code RPGR01, and has been included in the official list of regional protected areas since 2015.

It is also recognized as a site of significant botanical interest in Italy and was included in both the Natura 2000 network as SCI and SPA, important for the resting, wintering, and breeding of aquatic birds. It is the most important wetland in Tuscany for wintering ducks and also supports breeding herons and the Western marsh harrier.

== Geography ==
The reserve extends between the Bruna River and the coastal pine forest along the Castiglione della Pescaia–Marina di Grosseto road. The wetland is divided into the "Diaccia" and "Botrona" areas, hence the name. The area near the Bruna retains freshwater marsh characteristics, while the remaining section has become a brackish lagoon. Geologically, the reserve is of recent formation due to sediment deposition and reclamation works started by Peter Leopold of Tuscany in 1766.

== Landmarks ==
Within the reserve, Isola Clodia hosts the medieval remains of the Abbey of San Pancrazio al Fango. At the western edge of the Diaccia Botrona, the 18th-century Casa Rossa Ximenes, built by Jesuit mathematician Leonardo Ximenes, marks the historical reclamation works of the area. The building serves as the visitor centre and multimedia museum of the reserve, providing educational exhibits on the wetland's flora, fauna, and history.
