= Alessandro Manetti (architect) =

Italian architect and engineer (1787–1865)

- Born: 17 February 1787; Florence, Grand Duchy of Tuscany
- Died: 10 December 1865 (aged 78); Florence, Italy
- Occupations: Architect, engineer
- Known for: Leopoldo II Bridge

Alessandro Manetti (17 February 1787 – 10 December 1865) was an Italian architect and engineer.

Graduated from the Accademia di Belle Arti di Firenze, Manetti is responsible for several works in the Tuscany region during the 19th century, in particular the Leopold II Bridge (Ponte Leopoldo II) (completed in 1833) and the Cinta daziaria di Livorno (completed in 1835).

== See also ==
- Neoclassical architecture in Tuscany

== Bibliography ==
- D. Barsanti, L. Rombai (a cura di), Scienziati idraulici e territorialisti nella Toscana dei Medici e dei Lorena, Firenze 1994.
- C. Cresti, L. Zangheri, Architetti e ingegneri nella Toscana dell'Ottocento, Firenze 1978.
- A. Manetti, Mio passatempo. Scritto postumo del Comm. A. Manetti, già Direttore generale delle Acque e Strade e delle Fabbriche civili in Toscana, Tipografia Carnesecchi, Firenze 1885.
- G. Meini, Il commendatore Alessandro Manetti e le sue opere, Firenze 1867.
- E. Repetti, Dizionario geografico fisico storico della Toscana, Firenze 1833.
