= Lake Prile =

Former lake in Tuscany, Italy

Coordinates: 42°46′20″N 10°55′30″E

Lake Prile (Latin: Lacus Prelius or Prilis; Italian: Lago Prile), also known as Lake Castiglione (Italian: Lago di Castiglione), was a saltwater lake in southern Etruria, located in the Maremma region near the city of Grosseto.

This vast lagoon once defined the terminal plain of the Ombrone Valley and was home to two key Etruscan centers, Vetulonia and Rusellae. These cities thrived on the lagoon's resources, including trade, fishing, and salt production. During Roman times, the lakeside area was a vacation spot for the Roman patricians, and Cicero mentions it in an episode recounted in Pro Milone: in response to the landowner M. Paconius, who refused to sell "his island in Lake Prile", the Clodi had occupied the island with ships, unlawfully beginning the construction of their villa. The Lake Prile is also mentioned in Pliny the Elder's Natural History.

Over time, the lagoon became marshy and a breeding ground for malaria, earning the medieval name "Lake Castiglione" after the nearby village of Castiglione della Pescaia, on its western shore. Significant reclamation efforts began in the 16th century, and in 1828, Grand Duke Leopold II of Tuscany initiated a sediment transport process from the Ombrone River to fill the lake. Today, the remnants of the former Lake Prile include the 1,300 hectares of the Diaccia Botrona Nature Reserve, recognized as a wetland of international importance under the Ramsar Convention.

== Sources ==
- "Lago di Castiglion della Pescaja, Lago Prelio, Lago di Prile". Repetti Online. Archived from the original on 15 February 2022.
- "Il territorio del Padule". Atlante Storico Topografico del Comune di Grosseto. Archived from the original on 3 September 2007.
- "Fra la città e il tombolo". Atlante Storico Topografico del Comune di Grosseto. Archived from the original on 3 September 2007.
