= The Lute Player (Caravaggio) =

Painting by Caravaggio

- Suonatore di liuto (Italian)
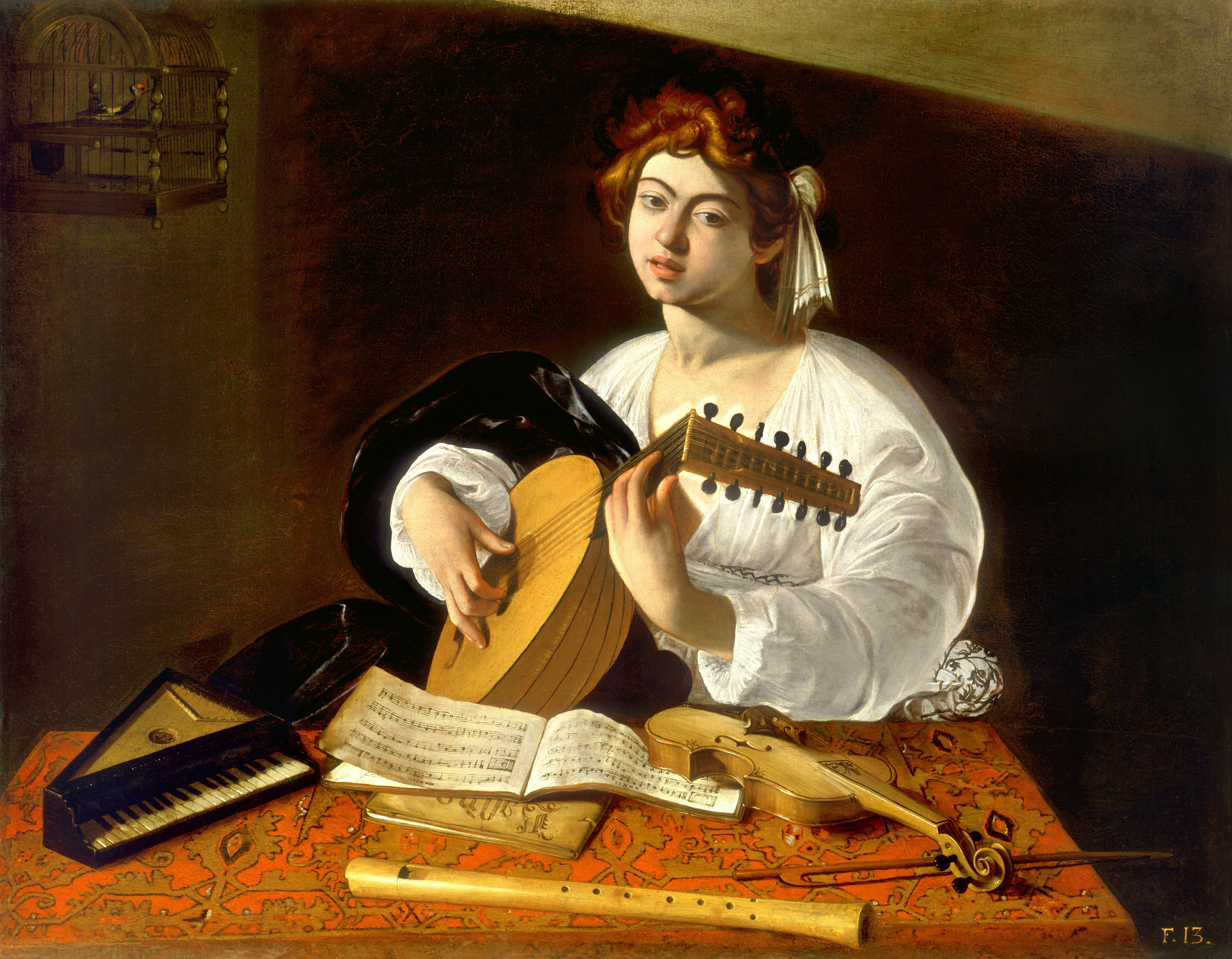
- Artist: Caravaggio
- Year: c. 1596
- Medium: Oil on canvas
- Dimensions: 100 cm × 126.5 cm (39 in × 49.8 in)
- Location: Wildenstein Collection

The Lute Player is a composition by the Italian Baroque master Caravaggio. It exists in two official versions, one in the Wildenstein Collection and another in the Hermitage Museum, St. Petersburg. The Wildenstein version was exhibited for many years at the Metropolitan Museum of Art. A third version called the Badminton House version is seen as a copy of The Hermitage picture. The Badminton House version was recently exhibited with the Hermitage picture together in 2020 at the Galleria Borghese.

== Background ==
Caravaggio's early biographer Giovanni Baglione gives the following description of a piece done by the artist for his patron Cardinal Francesco Maria del Monte:

E dipinse [per il Cardinale Del Monte]… anche un giovane, che sonava il Lauto, che vivo, e vero il tutto parea con una caraffa di fiori piena d’acqua, che dentro il reflesso d’ua fenestra eccelentemente si scorgeva con altri ripercotimenti di quella camera dentro l’acqua, e sopra quei fiori eravi una viva rugiada con ogni esquisita diligenza finta. E questo (disse) che fu il piu bel pezzo, che facesse mai. ("He also painted [for Cardinal Del Monte] a young man, playing the Lute, who seemed altogether alive and real with a carafe of flowers full of water, in which you could see perfectly the reflection of a window and other reflections of that room inside the water, and on those flowers there was a lively dew depicted with every exquisite care. And this (he said) was the best piece that he ever painted.)"

The painting exists in three versions. All show a boy with soft facial features and thick brown hair, accompanying himself on the lute as he sings a madrigal about love. As in the Uffizi Bacchus, the artist places a table-top in front of the figure. In the Hermitage and Badminton House versions it is bare marble, with a violin on one side and a still life of flowers and fruit on the other. In the Wildenstein version the table is covered with a carpet and extended forwards to hold a tenor recorder, while the still life is replaced by a spinetta (a small keyboard instrument) and a caged songbird. The musical instruments are valuable and probably came from del Monte's personal collection.

The Lute Player (detail from the Hermitage version).

The Hermitage and Badminton House versions show madrigals by Jacques Arcadelt (1515–1568), and the visible text reads in part: "Vous savez que je vous aime et vous adore...Je fus vôtre." ("You know I love you and adore you...I was yours"). The Wildenstein version shows songs by a native Florentine (Francesco de Layolle) on a text by Petrarch: Laisse le voile ('Let go the veil') and Pourquoi ne vous donnez-vous pas? ('Why do you not give yourself?') by Jacquet de Berchem. The flowers and damaged fruit, and the cracked body of the lute, suggest the theme of transience: love, like all things, is fleeting and mortal. The choice of Franco-Flemish composers over native Italians – only Layolle was a native Italian – no doubt reflects the cultural (and political) affiliations of the pro-French del Monte-Giustiniani circle.

The still life elements maintain a high standard for fine art in all versions, the rendered fruit and flowers in two versions equalled by the textures of spinetta and flute in the other, and the artist has reproduced the initial notes of the madrigals with such technicality that one would find it difficult to recognize the printer, Valerio Dorica.

The rather androgynous model could be Pedro Montoya, a castrato known to have been a member of the del Monte household and a singer at the Sistine Chapel at about this time – castrati were highly prized and the Cardinal was a patron of music as well as of painting. More recently Caravaggio biographer Peter Robb has identified him as Caravaggio's companion Mario Minniti, the model for several other paintings from this period including The Cardsharps and one of the two versions of The Fortune Teller.

All three versions demonstrate the innovative approach to light that Caravaggio adopted at this time. Caravaggio's method, as described by his contemporary Giulio Mancini, was to use "a strong light from above with a single window and the walls painted black, so that having the lights bright and the shadows dark, it gives depth to the painting, but with a method that is not natural nor done or thought of by any other century or older painters like Raphael, Titian, Correggio and others." The room itself seems to be the same as that in the Contarelli Chapel Calling of Saint Matthew, and the beam of light across the rear wall has an upper limit that would appear to be the shutter of the window above the table in the Calling. The carafe is a "cut-and-paste" motif from another image, where the main light came from a window at more or less the same level as the carafe itself. Such a complex illustration of refracted light is unprecedented in the Cinquecento, and may have been the result of collaboration with scientists in del Monte's circle, including Giovanni Battista della Porta, who was the guiding spirit behind the foundation in 1603 of the Accademia dei Lincei. His multi-volume De Refractione Optices (1593) was particularly concerned with optical matters, the second volume being devoted entirely to the incidence of light on water-filled and glass spheres. The circle of della Porta was significant for Caravaggio later on in Naples, where the commission for the Seven Acts of Mercy seems to have emanated from Giovanni Battista Manso, Marchese di Villa, whose friend, the alchemist Colantonio Stigliola, was a member of the Accademia dei Lincei.

The Lute Player (Hermitage version)
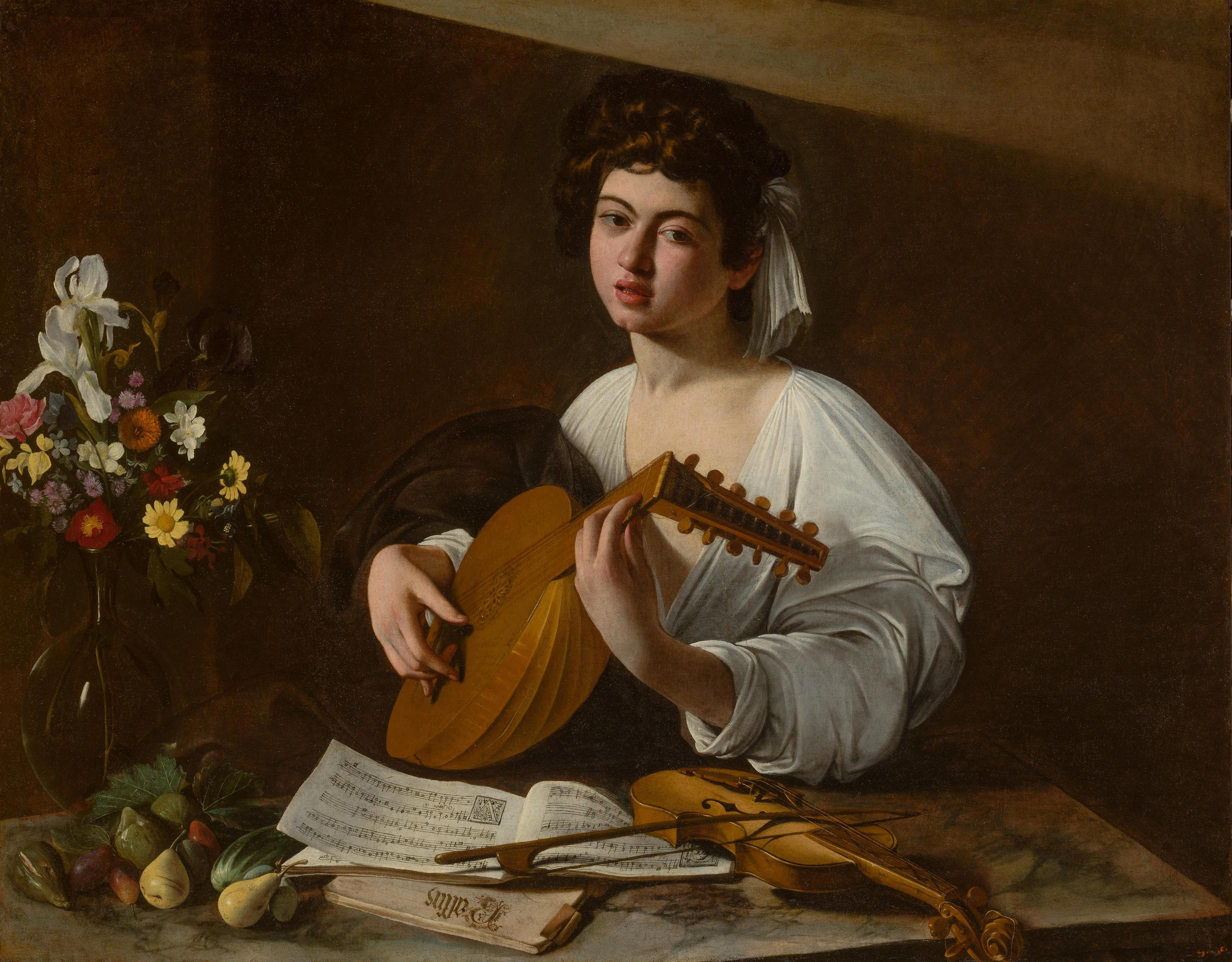
- Artist: Caravaggio
- Year: c.1600
- Medium: Oil on canvas
- Dimensions: 94 cm × 119 cm (37 in × 47 in)
- Location: Hermitage Museum, Saint Petersburg

The appearance of second originals is a feature of a new understanding of Caravaggio's work, and indeed Vincenzo Giustiniani, whose experience was closely related to the artist's career, describes in his Discorso sulla pittura the painter's development as beginning with copying others’ work – 'Proceeding further, he can also copy his own work, so that the replica may be as good, and even sometimes better, than the first'. The procedure for making a second version was, however, substantially different from the sometimes very arduous task of building a group from many separate observations of reality, of figures and objects; it is natural that the 'second original' is sometimes more fluent than the first. The anatomical anomalies in the Wildenstein and Badminton House paintings, like the slightly out of line eyes, or the hesitations in the profile of the hand, are resolved in the Hermitage picture. By contrast, the Hermitage version is more cursory in the drapery, less insistent in the detail, and it does not have the magnificent reflections in the carafe, which were specific to the alchemical context of the original. This is also the reason for the jealousy with which the group of pictures was regarded by Caravaggio's patron del Monte, and for the misunderstanding that the pursuit of natural philosophy incurred in the Rome of his day.

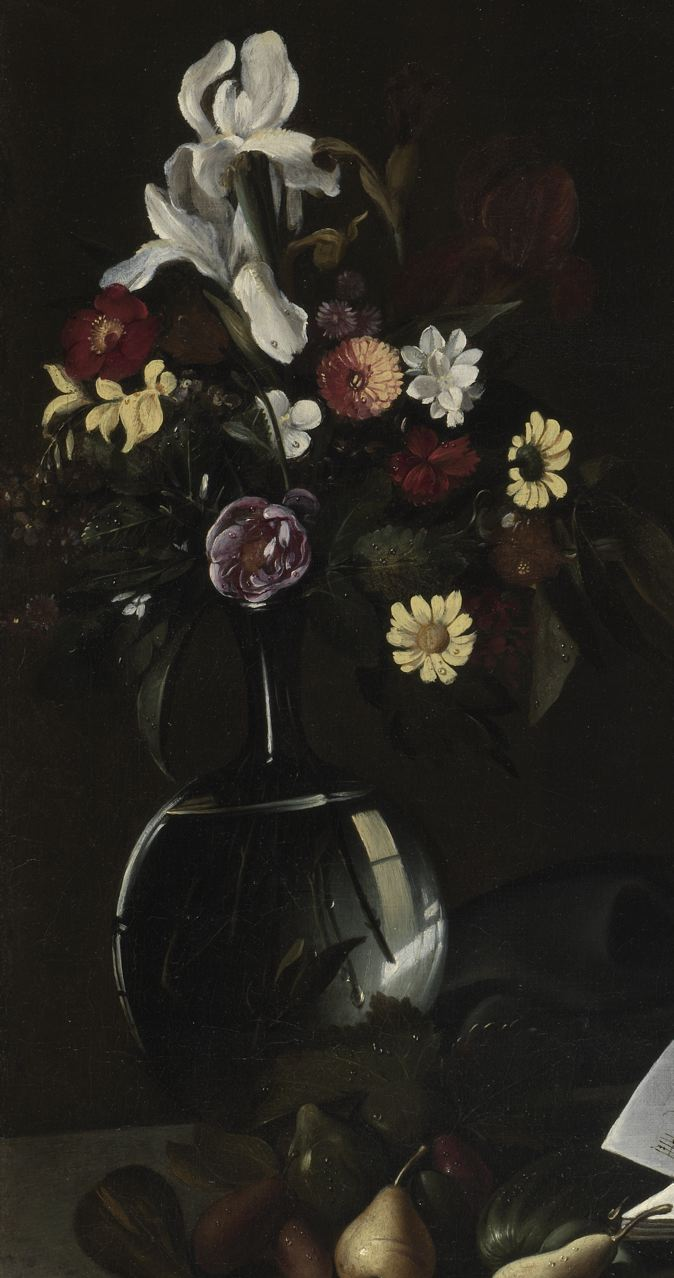
Apollo Lute Player (detail of flowers covered in dew as described by Baglione in 1642)

The Wildenstein version was sold by del Monte's heirs to Cardinal Antonio Barberini in 1628, when it was described as "Un giovane che sona di clevo" (without an attribution) and included with St Catherine and the Cardsharps (named specifically as by Caravaggio) and various other paintings. The painting is illuminated by a soft chiaroscuro inspired by the Brescia masters of the 16th century and characteristic of the early phase of Caravaggio's development. The catalogue to the 1990 exhibition held to mark the identification of the Wildenstein Lute Player – which was already known but thought to be a copy by another hand – commented on the markedly different lighting used for this version, claiming that it "marks a significant step toward the more dramatically lit, highly focused style of Caravaggio's maturity" – i.e., towards the heightened contrast between shadows and light (tenebrism) that would mark paintings such as The Martyrdom of Saint Matthew. Nevertheless, critic Jason Kaufman felt that the rendition of the boy in the Wildenstein version was aesthetically inferior to the Hermitage, "...the face...hard and the expression less sweet than bovine...[t]he features...more sharply defined, the eyebrows severely geometrized, and the complexion pink, rather than fleshtone, " and David Van Edwards, noting apparent mistakes in the depiction of the lute in the Wildenstein version, the secondary light source and the inconsistent perspectives of table and sitter, concluded that the painting is not by Caravaggio.

The Hermitage version is from the collection of the artist's other important patron of the period, del Monte's friend and neighbour, Marchese Vincenzo Giustiniani.

It was purchased in 1808 at the Paris auction by Alexander I of Russia through his personal art adviser Valily Rudanovsky. Purchasing was supported by Vivant Denon.

== Badminton House version ==
The Badminton House painting came to light at auction in Sotheby's, New York (January 25, 2001, lot 179); the painting was sold attributed to the circle of Caravaggio, possibly by Carlo Magnone. Clovis Whitfield, an art-dealer based in London, has questioned the attribution and suggested the Badminton House painting may actually be by Caravaggio. This conclusion was subsequently confirmed by several investigations and analyses.

Originally covered in a thick yellow varnish, it corresponds in all details with the description made by Baglione of the work he saw at Cardinal del Monte's palace. The flowers are scattered with dewdrops as Baglione remarks, and the carafe of water reflects the window and other features of the room. These elements, and the considerable number of pentimenti (incisions made in the paint with the brush-handle), set the Badminton House painting apart from the Hermitage version. It is slightly larger than the Hermitage work, whose original edge cuts the flowers on the left and the scroll of the violin, and painted with denser brushwork.

This painting would seem to be the one described in the 1627 inventory of del Monte's collection. It was not the painting described in 1628 by the heirs as ‘Un giovane che sona di clevo’ (without an attribution) which was sold together with Caravaggio's St Catherine and the Cardsharps (named specifically as by Caravaggio) and various other paintings to Cardinal Antonio Barberini, which has come down to us in the work in the Wildenstein collection.

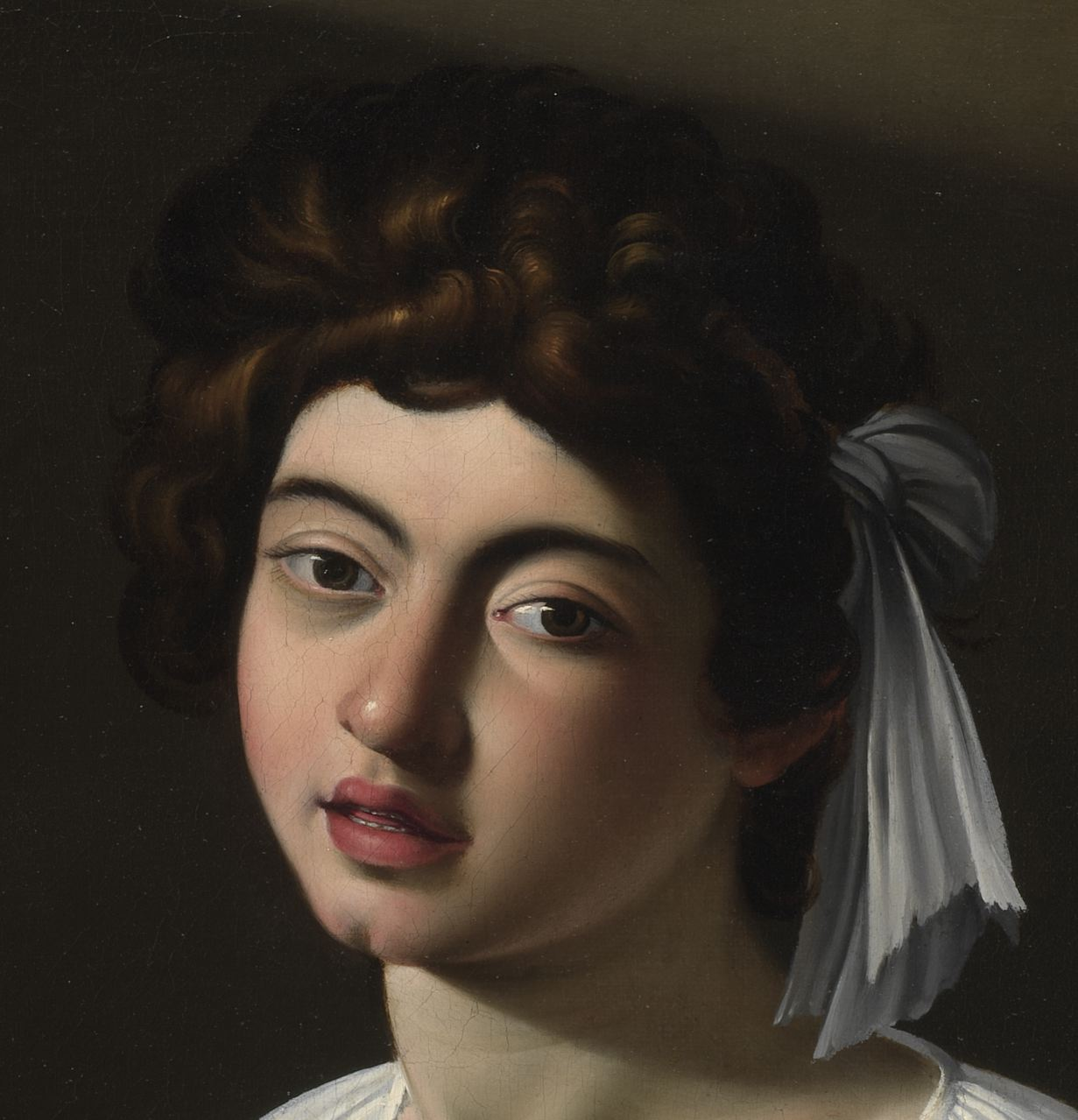
Apollo Lute Player (detail)

The flowerpiece is of major importance for the still-life tradition, not only in Italy, but also in the Netherlands, and there is a certain link to earlier Flemish painting; for example, many of the Flemish flower painters, from Jan Brueghel the Elder to Ambrosius Bosschaert and Balthasar van der Ast, often waited to study separate specimens in various seasons of the year but include them all in a fictive assembly. The fruits in The Lute Player, however, are not of the same season as the flowers, suggesting a similar cross-seasonal approach as Brueghel and Bosschaert.

Apollo the Lute Player
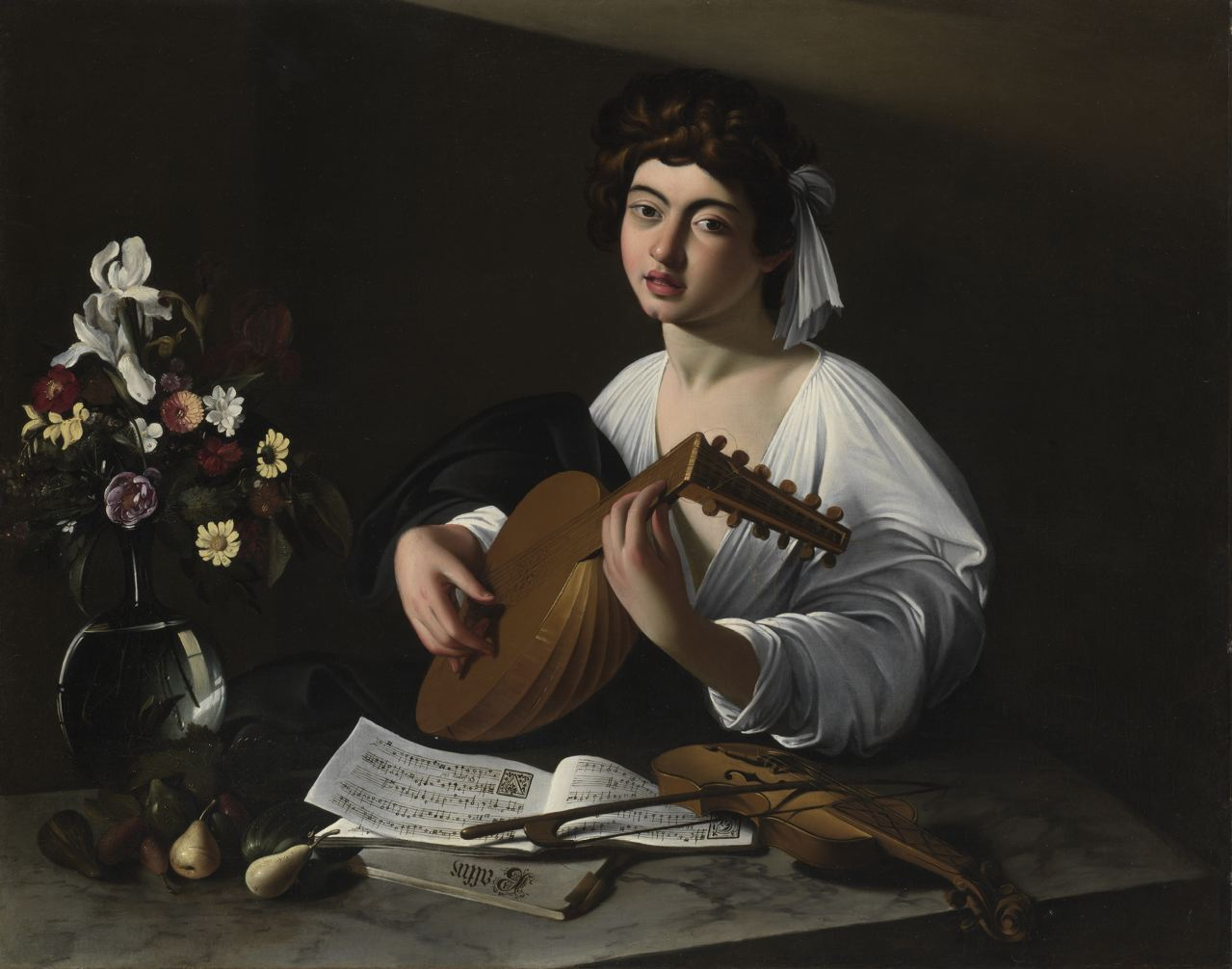
- Artist: Caravaggio
- Year: c.1596
- Medium: Oil on canvas
- Dimensions: 96 cm × 121 cm (38 in × 48 in)
- Location: Ex-Badminton House, Gloucestershire

The flowers correspond with those illustrated by Giovanni Battista della Porta in his Magia Naturale (Naples, 1589) as ones corresponding to vision, from the marigold that looks like the Sun, the yellow cornflower that looks like the eye, to another flower that resembles the eyebright that was since the Middle Ages an ingredient in eye remedies. This would go some way to explaining the nature of the choice of the flowers, which are dominated by the irises at the top, and Iris was not only the messenger of the gods, but in the optical frame stood for the rainbow and the spectrum of colours that the various flowers represent. Once again, della Porta's De refractione optices has an entire book devoted to ‘De Iride et colore’, an attempt to arrive at an understanding of the rainbow. But the naturalism of the flowers, including the seedpods of the iris and the shrivelled florets, shows that Caravaggio was observing these from actual specimens, and not improving on what nature might have arrived at had circumstances been different. The tacit expression of the theory of segnatura, the correspondence of certain forms from the natural world with those in man, is something that links the thinking behind the painting with Paracelsian belief. Del Monte's interest in this is manifest in the group of portraits that hung in his alchemical Casino, which are of the same seven luminaries who are illustrated in the title page of Oswald Croll's Basilica Chymica (Frankfurt, 1609). We know that the Casino on the Pincio was the centre in Rome of the practice of iatrochymia or chemical medicine, although this kind of natural philosophy was increasingly frowned on and may well have played a part in the damnation memoriae that del Monte was subjected to. But Federico Cesi and his Accademia dei Lincei were also dedicated followers of what they perceived as Paracelsian disciplines.

It appears likely that The Lute Player was originally intended as a decoration for the studiolo on the first floor of the Casino on the Pincio that del Monte had acquired in 1596, and where Guercino would later paint his fresco of Aurora for the Ludovisi. On the ground floor del Monte did his alchemical work and chemistry; above, on the ceiling of the studiolo, Caravaggio painted the gods Jupiter, Neptune and Pluto, representing the Elements. Apollo would have struck the right chord in representing the harmony of the universe, in a place opposite the single window. Already the strength of his painting style was in painting classical subjects from life around him; like the Bacchus in the painting in the Uffizi, their features were sometimes disguised by their contemporary appearance. Since Giordano Bruno had written that it was appropriate to represent Apollo, ever-youthful, playing the lute, as opposed to his more conventional lyre, this may have been del Monte's intention in this painting, and the rays of sunlight that are such a feature of the glass sphere have this meaning. Apollo is very much in place in a room devoted to the elements, as is implied in the ceiling painting, for the Stanza degli Elementi that Giorgio Vasari did in Palazzo Vecchio has Apollo with the Chariot of the Sun in its middle, and del Monte had this subject as the centrepiece of the ceiling in his new studiolo in Palazzo Avogadro, painted by Andrea Sacchi. Indeed, one of the most copied images in Giulio Romano's decoration of the Palazzo del Te is the ceiling with that perhaps Caravaggio may have known from a drawing.

The studiolo had room also for another of del Monte's pictures, the Shepherd Corydon. This work, now in the Capitoline Museums, has long been misconstrued as St. John the Baptist, but apart from the exhibitionist subject of the young boy, the ram (instead of a lamb) is a contradiction for that subject. Instead the work is an emblematic subject: the ram represents the first sign of the Zodiac, Aries, at the period of the spring equinox and the energy of that season. In the combination of themes, the harmony of the spheres is represented figuratively by Apollo the Luteplayer, where the spring equinox and the spring flowers are balanced by the fruits of autumn on the table – from the autumn equinox – under the sign of Libra, when the forces of nature are once again in equilibrium. It is easier to see the effeminate beauty of the shepherd as corresponding to del Monte's personal aesthetic taste, than as the work that Ciriaco Mattei commissioned shortly afterwards for his first-born son, named indeed Giovanni Battista, a painting that is to be sought in one of the many paintings of St John the Baptist that Caravaggio executed. There was such a picture, painted for the Mattei family and later also bought by Cardinal Pio from the del Monte collection, an oblong composition with St John playing with a lamb, and with a reed cross on his shoulder, that was eventually sold to Gavin Hamilton in 1777.

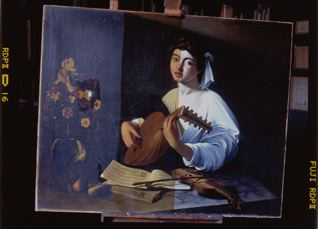
Apollo Lute Player during cleaning

The idea of "correspondences" that informed so much of contemporary natural philosophy, means that the globe of the carafe with its reflections, like a crystal ball, would have been seen as a parallel with the celestial globe on the ceiling with the Elements above. This feature, described in the painting of the Lute Player that Baglione saw presumably in situ with Cardinal del Monte, is absent from the Hermitage version. Elements of the composition of the Apollo Lute Player are repeated not only in the Hermitage work (with several counterpoint variations), but also in the glass carafe in the lower part of the two paintings A Boy bitten by a Lizard, most especially in the version in the National Gallery, London. There the central rose and white jasmine is quite close to these elements in the present work, while in the Longhi Foundation picture the rose is a white one. The lower daisy in the present work has been repositioned, and in fact a prominent pentiment exists 3 cm above, and that is the position it has in the Hermitage painting of the Lute Player. It could well be that the original flowerpiece that we know del Monte owned of Caravaggio's, which he seems to have bought even before he met him, probably through the local picture dealer Maestro Valentino, could have been the continuing source of these variations. It was a painting described as a carafe of flowers, two palmi high, which was bought at the 1628 sale of the del Monte collection in a lot that included The Musicians, but it has not been heard of since. It is interesting that he would devote such care to a painting of flowers, as he did also to the Basket of Fruit in the Ambrosiana, and that he was not averse to doing this, as is illustrated by the fact that he introduced the carafe of water with the same reflections into the canvases of the A Boy bitten by a Lizard, without regard to the position of the figure in front of the light sources.

Since the artist spent, according to Giovanni Pietro Bellori, four or five years in Rome doing repetitious devotional images, and copies of portrait heads ‘un grosso l’uno’, it was natural for him to repeat his own inventions when he arrived at this sensational new technique of copying reality, from a virtual image, instead of other people's compositions. The parabolic mirror, probably the same one that della Porta had had constructed in Venice in 1580, which had produced some sensational effects and led to the development of the camera obscura, was probably no larger than an eye-glass, but it made it possible to make a mosaic of naturalistic images that was extremely compelling; the technique also explains the shallow focus of Caravaggio's compositions.

== See also ==
- 100 Great Paintings, 1980 BBC series
- List of paintings by Caravaggio
