= Ludovisi (rione of Rome) =

Coordinates: 41°54′26″N 12°29′27″E

R. XVI Ludovisi
- Rione of Rome
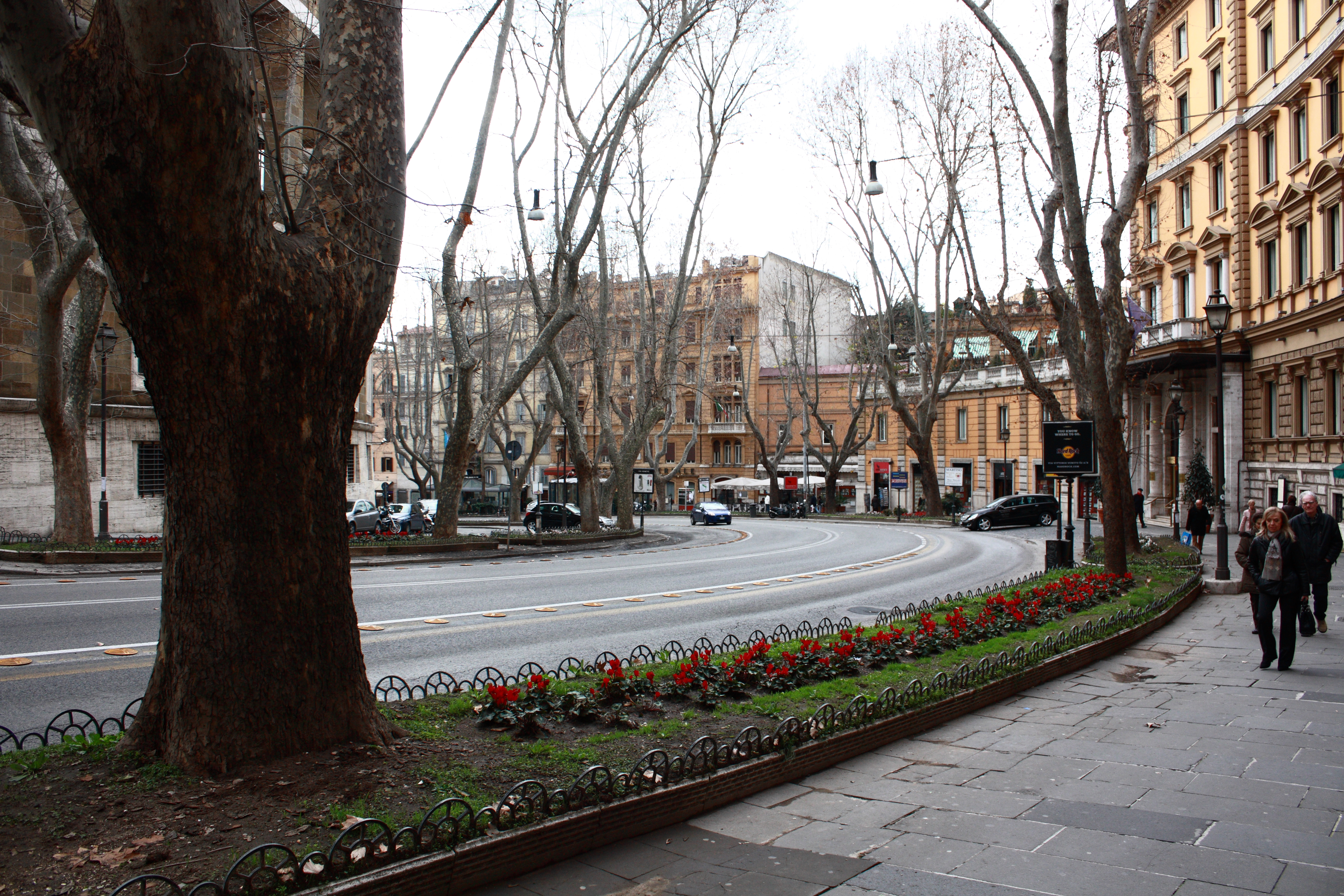
- Via Veneto

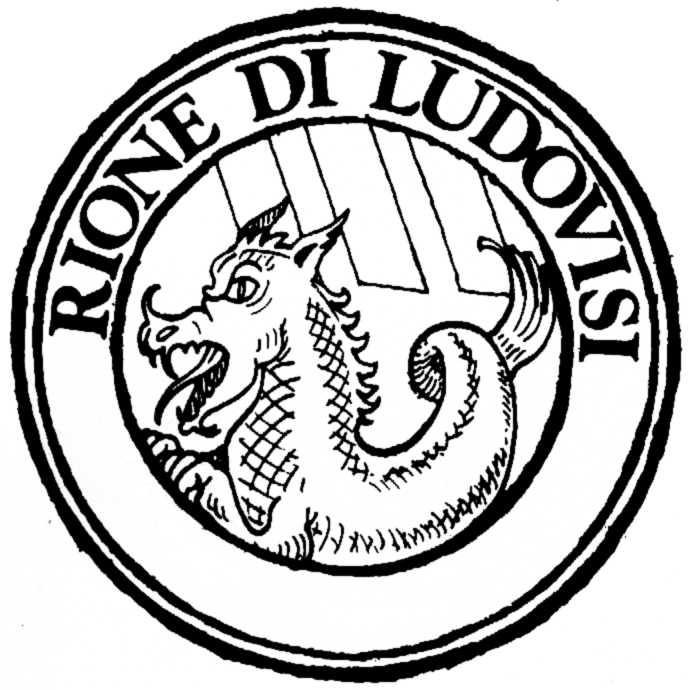
- Seal

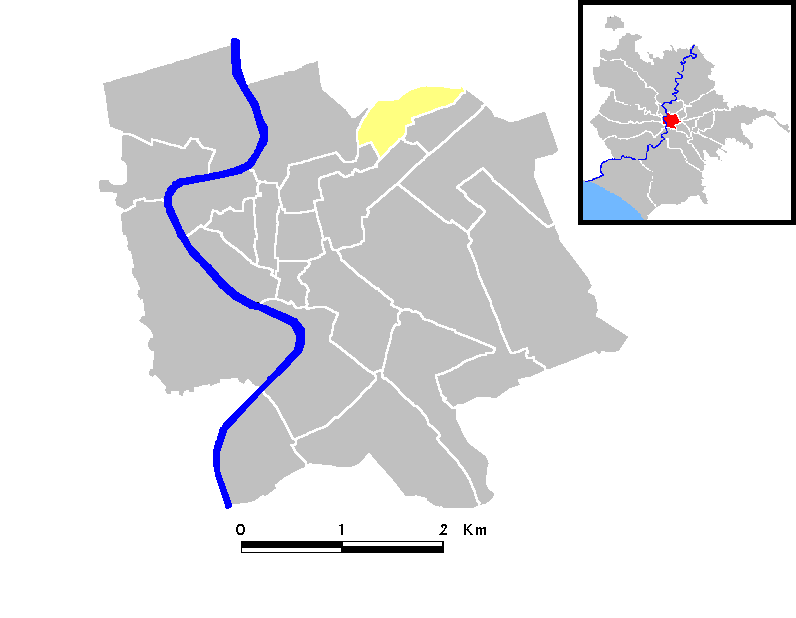
- Position of the rione within the center of the city
- Country: Italy
- Region: Lazio
- Province: Rome
- Comune: Rome
- Established: 20 August 1921

Area
  - Total: 0.1255 sq mi (0.3251 km^{2})
  - Density: 12,840/sq mi (4,958/km^{2})
- Time zone: UTC+1 (CET)
  - Summer (DST): UTC+2 (CEST)

Ludovisi (Italian: [ludoˈviːzi]) is the 16th rione of Rome, Italy, identified by the initials R. XVI and located within the Municipio I.

Its coat of arms depicts three golden bands and a golden dragon on a red background. It is the coat of arms of the noble Ludovisi family, which here owned the beautiful villa bearing the same name. The villa and the surrounding gardens, except for a single building, the Villa Aurora, were destroyed at the end of the 19th century to build the new district.

== History ==
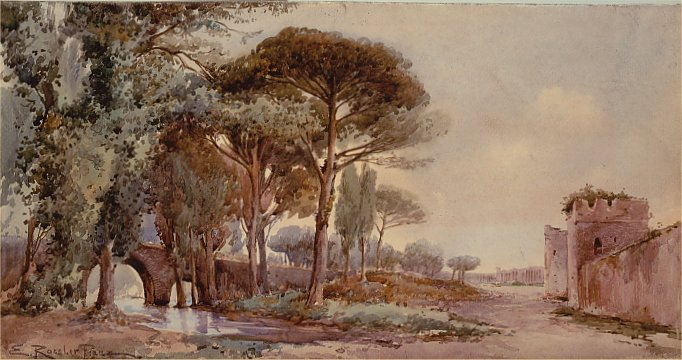
Villa Ludovisi, c. 1880 (watercolor by Ettore Roesler Franz)

The rione was born after the unification of Italy (such as San Saba, Testaccio and Prati), from the convention, signed in 1886, between the Boncompagni (heirs of the Ludovisi) and the Municipality of Rome. With this act, the Lords of Piombino assigned to the housing development the area of Villa Ludovisi: about 25 hectares of park between the walls and the historical rioni of Trevi and Colonna, which between the 17th and 19th centuries had extended eastward up to Porta Salaria (the present Piazza Fiume).

This housing development, its events, its protagonists, can be considered an exemplary episode of the growth imparted by the Savoys to the new capital; a growth based on speculative construction that attracted businessmen from around Europe and, in the space of not even twenty-five years, led the city from the breach of Porta Pia to the economic crisis of the latter 1880s, to the Banca Romana scandal.

The technical and financial arm of the operation (uselessly deprecated by the European intellectuals of the time as an unforgivable ugliness) was the Società Generale Immobiliare, established in Turin in 1862, which followed the movements of the capitals of the Savoy kingdom moving its headquarters first in Florence (in 1862) and then finally in Rome in 1880; here it became, for a century, the great protagonist of the Roman building speculation.

The project for the development of the rione can be dated back to 1870, when Rome became the new Italian capital: it is no coincidence that Prince Ignazio Boncompagni of Piombino had been one of the 18 members of the temporary city council (6 nobles, 4 bourgeois and 8 landowners and merchants of the countryside) that, among its first acts, had established a Commission of architects and engineers to select the projects «for the construction of new neighbourhoods in that part [of the city] that is best suited to the new building». The concerned part was the high one, between the Esquiline and the Pincian Hill, already identified for its proximity to Termini, where several entrepreneurs from Northern Italy and abroad had already started to build.

Between projects, opinions and debates, the first master plan of the urban development of the "third Rome", signed by Alessandro Viviani, was launched in 1873, thus legitimising the 7 agreements with the Municipality of Rome for the construction of new neighbourhoods that had already been ratified "regardless".

More than 10 years passed, during which both the new properties and the prices of the building areas went on growing, before an official and binding master plan was launched in 1883, based on a law of 1881. Although the latter Viviani master plan provided for the intangibility of Villa Ludovisi, the aristocracy of the town also wished to participate in the game; so it was that the prince in title at the time, Rodolfo Boncompagni Ludovisi, in 1886 signed an agreement with the Municipality and with the Società Generale Immobiliare for the urbanisation, the allotment and the «building of a neighbourhood of private dwellings in the Villa formerly Ludovisi».

The deal was however concluded on the eve of the crisis, which involved the Prince of Piombino and brought the Immobiliare on the verge of bankruptcy which was avoided in 1898 thanks to an arrangement with the creditors.

After the acute phase of the crisis was over, the housing development found new vitality: elegant buildings had already been built on Via di Porta Pinciana, in 1890 the Palazzo Margherita had been completed, in 1905 Villa Maraini, the Hotel Flora and the Hotel Excelsior arose and in 1906 Via Vittorio Veneto, the thoroughfare of the rione, was completed. Another season of intense construction took place between 1925 and 1935, with the Hotel Ambasciatori, the INA building and the headquarters of the Ministry of Economic Development (born as Chamber of Fasces and Corporations).

== Geography ==
The rione borders with:

- northward, quartieri Pinciano (Q. III) and Salario (Q. IV);
- eastward, Sallustiano (R. XVII);
- southward, Trevi (R. II) and Colonna (R. III);
- westward, Campo Marzio (R. IV).

=== Coat or arms ===
Gules, three golden bands withdrawn in the head and a gold dragon cut at the tip (coat of arms of the Boncompagni-Ludovisi) family.

== Places of interest ==
=== Palaces and other buildings ===
- Palazzo Margherita, on Via Vittorio Veneto.

Seat of the Embassy of the United States of America.

- Palazzo Piacentini, on Via Vittorio Veneto at the corner of Via Molise. S

seat of the Ministry of Economic Development.

- Villa Ludovisi (Casino dell'Aurora), on Via Lombardia.
- Villino Florio, on Via Abruzzi at the corner of Via Sardegna.
- House of Dust, on Via Piemonte.

=== Religious buildings ===
- Santa Maria della Concezione dei Cappuccini
- Sant’Isidoro a Capo le Case
- San Patrizio a Villa Ludovisi
- Santa Maria Regina dei Cuori
- Chiesa evangelica luterana
- Santissimo Redentore e Santa Francesca Saverio Cabrini
- San Marone
- Corpus Christi
- Sant'Andrea di Grecia
- San Lorenzo da Brindisi (deconsecrated)
- San Giuseppe Calasanzio (deconsecrated)

=== School buildings ===
- Liceo scientifico statale Augusto Righi, on Via Campania.
- Liceo ginnasio Torquato Tasso, on Via Sicilia.
- Secondary public school Michelangelo Buonarroti, on Via Puglie.
- Primary school Regina Elena, on Via Puglie.

=== Gates ===
- Porta Pinciana

=== Fountains ===
- Fontana delle Api

== Notes ==
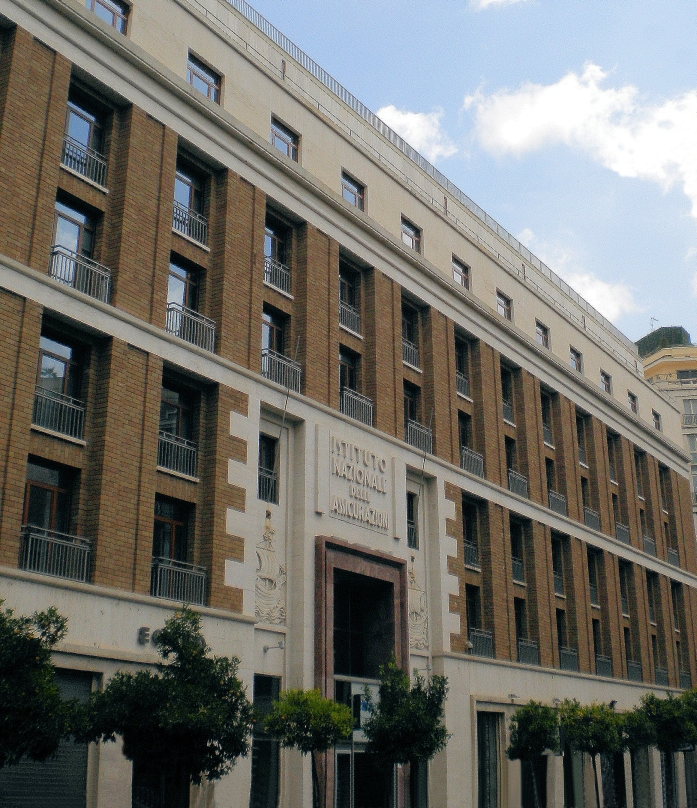
The headquarters of INA Assitalia on Via Leonida Bissolati

== Bibliography ==
- Giorgio Carpaneto (1990). "RIONE XVI. LUDOVISI". I Rioni e i Quartieri di Roma. Vol. 5. Rome: Newton Compton Editori.
- Carlo Pietrangeli (1953). "Insegne e stemmi dei rioni di Roma" (PDF). Capitolium. Rassegna di attività municipali. anno XXVIII (6). Rome: Tumminelli – Istituto Romano di Arti Grafiche.
- AA.VV. (2000). La grande guida dei rioni di Roma. Rome: Newton & Compton.
- Claudio Rendina; Donatella Paradisi (2004). Le strade di Roma. Vol. 1. Rome: Newton Compton Editori. ISBN 88-541-0208-3.
- Franco Ferrarotti (2009). Spazio e convivenza: come nasce la marginalità urbana. Rome: Armando Armando.
- Paola Puzzuoli. La politica delle aree della Società generale immobiliare (PDF).
