= Batteriekopf =

Peak in the Vosges Mountains

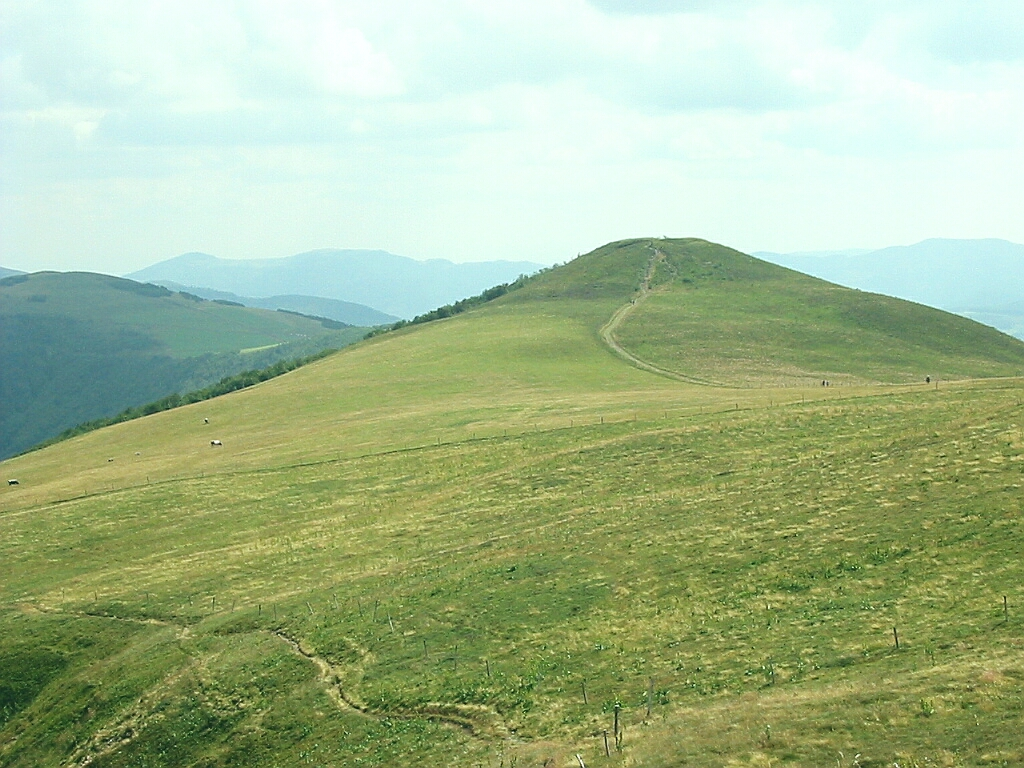
- The Batteriekopf.

Highest point
- Elevation: 1,311 m (4,301 ft)
- Coordinates: 47°59′38″N 6°58′50″E

Geography
- Location within France
- Location: Alsace, France
- Parent range: Vosges Mountains

The Batteriekopf is a peak in the Vosges Mountains, reaching an altitude of 1,311 meters. This mountain borders the Route des Crêtes and is located immediately south of the Rothenbachkopf, spanning the municipalities of Wildenstein and Metzeral.

== Environmental protection ==
Part of the western slope of Batteriekopf is included in the Hautes-Chaumes du Rothenbach regional nature reserve which aims to preserve the summit lawns.

== See also ==
- Vosges Mountains
