= Jupiter, Neptune and Pluto =

Painting by Caravaggio

- Artist: Caravaggio
- Year: c. 1597
- Type: Oil on plaster ceiling
- Dimensions: 300 cm × 180 cm (120 in × 71 in)
- Location: Villa Aurora; Rome

Jupiter, Neptune and Pluto (c. 1597) is a painting by Italian Baroque master Michelangelo Merisi da Caravaggio. It is located in the Villa Aurora, the former hunting lodge of the erstwhile Villa Ludovisi, Rome. It is unusually painted in oils on plaster and hence it is not a fresco, although it is sometimes (incorrectly) referred to as such. Oil painting is normally on canvas or, less frequently, on wood.

== Context ==
According to an early biographer, one of Caravaggio's aims was to discredit critics who claimed that he had no grasp of perspective. The three figures demonstrate the most dramatic foreshortening imaginable. They contradict claims that Caravaggio always painted from live models. The artist seems to have used his own face for all three gods.

== Description ==
Cardinal Francesco Maria del Monte, Caravaggio's patron, had a keen interest in alchemy. Caravaggio has painted an allegory of the alchemical triad of Paracelsus: Jupiter stands for sulphur and air, Neptune for mercury and water, and Pluto for salt and earth. Each figure is identified by his beast: Jupiter by the eagle, Neptune by the hippocamp, and Pluto by the three-headed dog Cerberus. Jupiter is reaching out to move the celestial sphere in which the Sun revolves around the Earth.

== History ==
The painting was done for Caravaggio's patron Cardinal del Monte and painted on the ceiling of the Cardinal's garden casino of his country estate, which later became known as the Villa Ludovisi.

The Villa Aurora is private property in the hands of the Ludovisi family.

The property, including the mural, was put up for sale in 2021 after an inheritance dispute following the death of its last owner, Prince Nicolò Boncompagni Ludovisi, in 2018. The presence of the Caravaggio painting was a major part of the elevated price of the property, potentially making it one of the most expensive residences globally.

The property was put up for auction by a notary on January 18, 2022 for a minimum bid of 471 million euros. There were no offers. The villa requires an estimated 10 million euros of restoration work. It will be offered again at a 20 percent discount (minimum offer) on April 7, 2022.

== See also ==
- List of paintings by Caravaggio
