= Jacquet de Berchem =

Franco-Flemish composer

Jacquet de Berchem (also known as Giachet(to) Berchem or Jakob van Berchem; c. 1505 – before 2 March 1567) was a Franco-Flemish composer of the Renaissance, active in Italy. He was famous in mid-16th-century Italy for his madrigals, approximately 200 of which were printed in Venice, some in multiple printings due to their considerable popularity. As evidence of his widespread fame, he is listed by Rabelais in Gargantua and Pantagruel as one of the most famous musicians of the time, and the printed music for one of his madrigals appears in a painting by Caravaggio (The Lute Player).

== Life ==
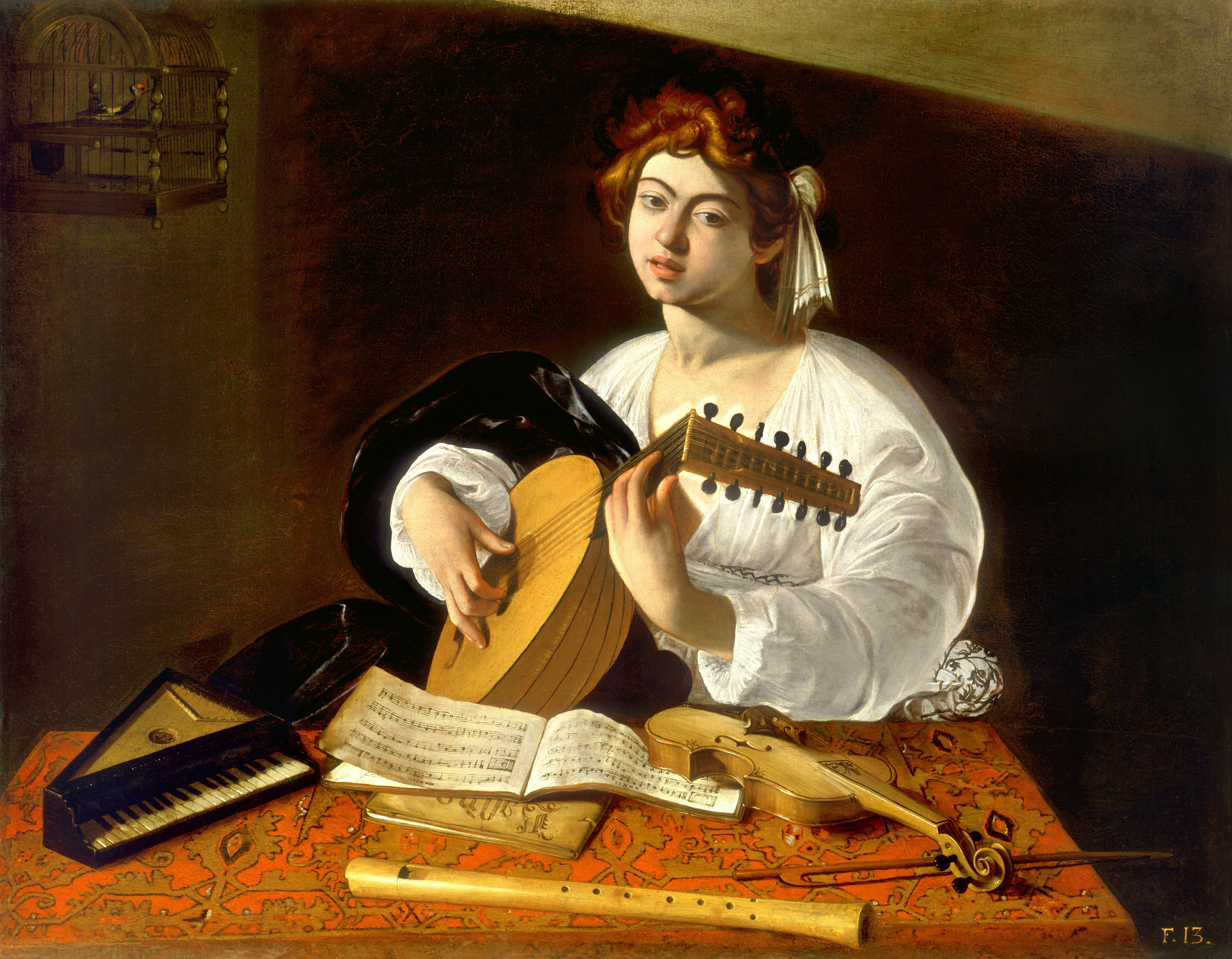
The Lute Player by Caravaggio (1596). One of the musical scores shown in this painting is a secular composition by Jacquet de Berchem.

Berchem was born around 1505 in Berchem (now part of Antwerp), in the southern Netherlands (modern-day Belgium). No archival records have yet been found covering his early life; the first mention of him dates from 1539, by which time he had come to Venice, as did many of his musical compatriots from the Low Countries. By 1538 or 1539, his madrigals were being published in Venice, largely by Antonio Gardano. Between then and 1546, he lived in Venice, steadily increasing in reputation, and in 1546 he published his first book of madrigals. Previously, his works had been in collections consisting mostly of music by others (for example, Jacques Arcadelt, whose first book of madrigals for four voices, published in 1539, included some music by Berchem). He most likely was a student of fellow Netherlander Adrian Willaert, the founder of the Venetian School and one of the most famous musicians of the time, and through Willaert met other musicians and nobility. To some of these aristocrats, including a future Doge of Venice (Marcantonio Trevisan, Doge 1553–54 and patron of the arts), he dedicated some of his music.

Between 1546 and 1550, Berchem served as maestro di cappella at Verona Cathedral. Some of his music written during this time and in the early 1550s is dedicated to Alfonso II d'Este; he may have been looking for employment with the Este court in Ferrara, but no evidence of his employment there has been found.

Around 1550, Berchem left Verona and began seeking employment elsewhere in Italy. His exact activities in the early 1550s are not known, but he made the acquaintance of patrons in Rome and Monopoli, and through one of these patrons met his future wife, Giustina de Simeonibus, to whom he was married in 1553. He seems to have lived the remainder of his life in Monopoli, a town near Bari on the heel of the Italian "boot", where he lived in relative affluence, since both the governor and bishop of Monopoli were his patrons, and his wife was from an aristocratic family. His exact date of death is not known, but he is mentioned as being alive by Guicciardini in his Descrittione (published in 1567, but likely written around 1565). He had died by March 2, 1567.

== Works ==
While Berchem wrote a few sacred works – two masses and nine motets have been securely attributed to him – it is on his more than 200 secular works that his reputation rests. Most of his secular works are Italian madrigals, with the rest being chansons in French. The sacred works are relatively conservative in style, using cantus firmus techniques, canon, and other devices common a generation earlier.

In his secular music, his style varied throughout his career, with his earlier madrigals, such as in the 1546 collection, tending towards polyphonic textures as was the common practice of the Franco-Flemish school, and the later madrigals, such as those in the 1561 collection, being more homophonic and syllabic, often with quick text declamation. His preferred subject matter was love, typically unrequited, and he set texts by Petrarch, Ariosto, Luigi Tansillo, Luigi Cassola, and others. One of his most ambitious projects was a setting of 91 stanzas of Ariosto's Orlando furioso, entitled Capriccio (this is the earliest known use of "Capriccio" as a musical title). This work first appeared in his 1561 madrigal collection, published by Antonio Gardano, and was dedicated to Alfonso II d'Este.

His Alla dolc'ombra, published in 1544, may be the earliest attempt to create a madrigal cycle, preceding similar groups of madrigals by Jan Nasco and Vincenzo Ruffo, madrigalists also active in northern Italy at the same time. Madrigal cycles were one of several precursors to opera.

== Influence ==
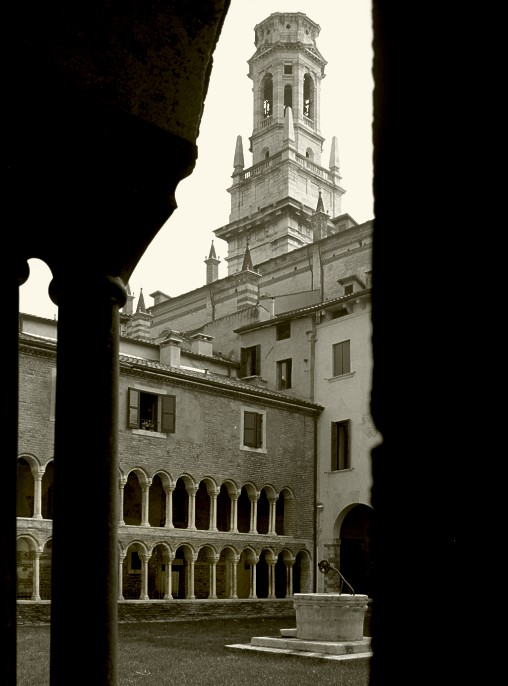
Verona Cathedral: view from the Cathedral cloister with Sanmicheli's bell tower. Berchem was maestro di cappella here from 1546 until 1550.

Berchem's madrigals were widely printed and distributed. Many of them were subsequently printed in instrumental versions, for example lute intabulations; it is one of these scores which appears in Caravaggio's painting The Lute Player, which was painted approximately fifty years after the music's first publication. Music by Berchem continued to appear in collections well into the 17th century.

Confusion of his name with other composers named "Jacquet" or "Jacques" (for example Jacquet of Mantua, Jacques Buus, and Jacquet Brumel, organist at Ferrara and son of Antoine Brumel) was as common then as now, and may have been one of the reasons he sought to have his madrigals printed in editions containing only his own works. In the preface to his 1546 publication of madrigals for five voices he specifically mentions "crows who dress up in swan's feathers" and implies that plagiarists and those who misattribute his compositions will be corrected.

François Rabelais mentions Berchem in the prologue to the Fourth Book of Gargantua and Pantagruel (probably written in 1546), putting Berchem last on the list of the most distinguished musicians of the time, a list which begins with Josquin des Prez and Johannes Ockeghem. These distinguished musicians sing, in the story, and in the context of a long tale by Priapus in which he boasts of his extraordinary male endowment, a ribald song involving the use of a mallet to deflower a new bride.

== Modern Editions ==
Jachet Berchem, Il primo libro di madrigali a quattro voci (1555), a cura di Galliano Ciliberti e Giovanni Rota, Bari, Florestano Edizioni, 2010.
