= Salario (Rome) =

Q. IV Salario
- Quartiere of Rome
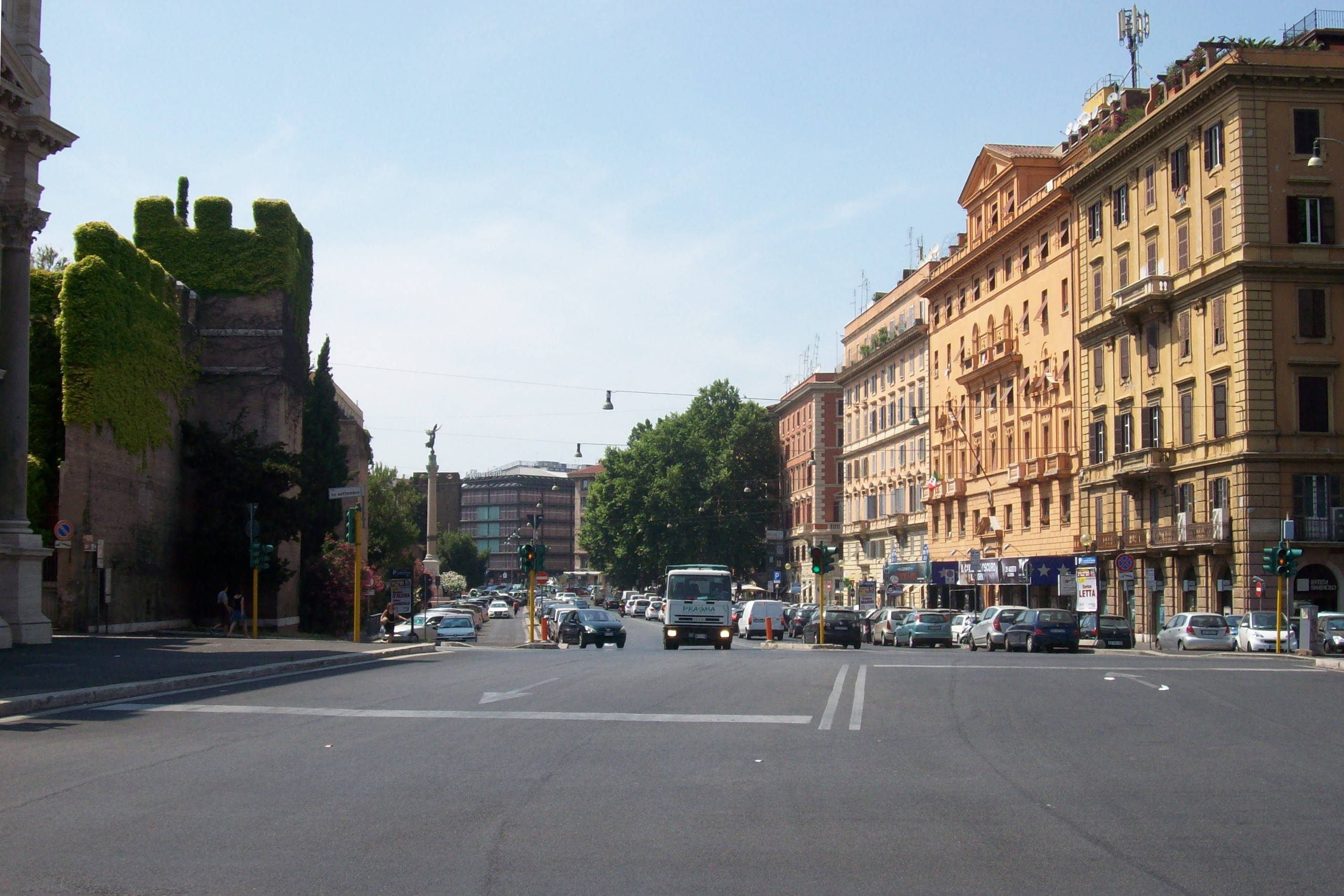
- Corso d'Italia at the border between the Quartiere Salario and the historic center; on the left, the Aurelian Walls.

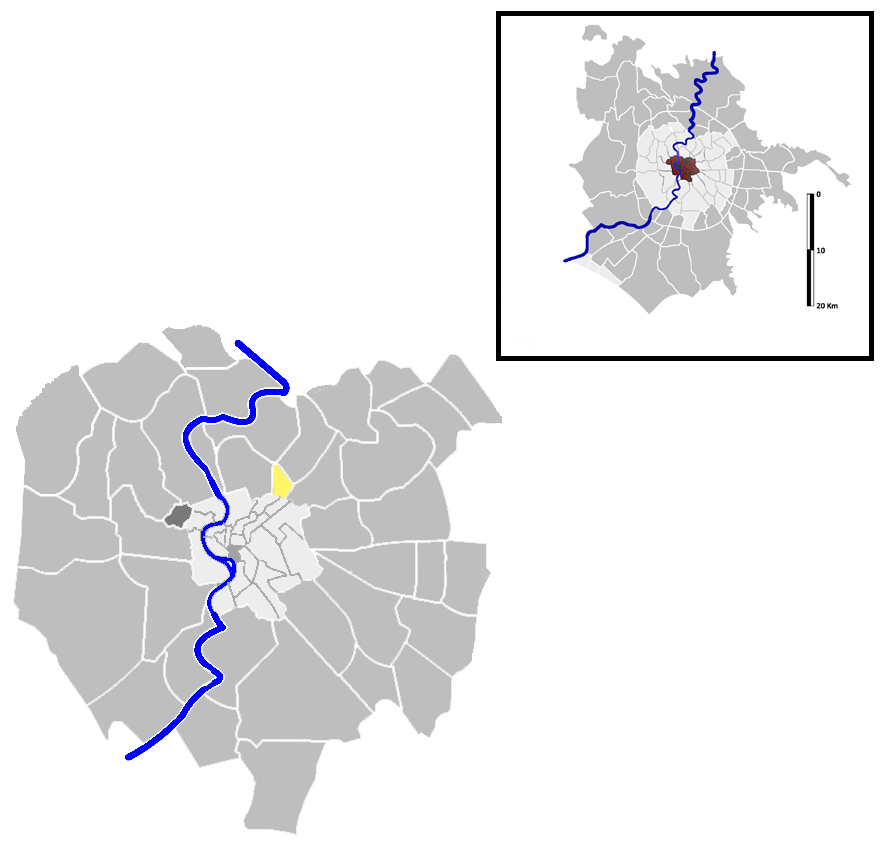
- Position of the quartiere within the city of Rome
- Country: Italy
- Region: Lazio
- Province: Rome
- Comune: Rome
- Municipio: Municipio Roma II
- Established: 20 August 1921

Area
  - Total: 0.1810 sq mi (0.4688 km^{2})

Population
  - Total: 8,301
  - Density: 45,860/sq mi (17,707/km^{2})
- Time zone: UTC+1 (CET)
  - Summer (DST): UTC+2 (CEST)

Salario is the 4th quarter of Rome (Italy), identified with the initials Q. IV.

The toponym also indicates the Urban Zone 2D of the Municipio II of Rome Capital.

It takes its name from the Via Salaria and is the smallest quarter of Rome.

== Geography ==
It is located in the northern area of the city, close to the Aurelian Walls.

The territory of the quartiere includes the urban zone 2D Salario.

=== Boundaries ===
The quarter borders:

- to the north-east, with the quarter Q. XVII Trieste along the stretch of Viale Regina Margherita between Via Salaria and Via Nomentana.
- to the east, with the quarter Q. V Nomentano along the stretch of Via Nomentana between Viale Regina Margherita and Piazzale di Porta Pia.
- to the south, with the rione R. XVII Sallustiano along the Aurelian Walls (Corso d'Italia) between Piazzale di Porta Pia and Piazza Fiume.
- to the west, with the quarter Q. III Pinciano along the stretch of Via Salaria between Piazza Fiume and Viale Regina Margherita.

The Urban Zone borders:

- to the north with the Urban Zone 2Y Villa Ada.
- to the north-east with the Urban Zone 2E Trieste.
- to the south-east with the Urban Zone 3A Nomentano.
- to the south with the Urban Zone 1F XX Settembre.
- to the west, with the Urban Zones 2X Villa Borghese and 2B Parioli.

=== Odonymy ===
Just like in the bordering quarters, streets and squares of Salario are mostly named after Italian cities (south of Villa Albani) and rivers (in the northern area). Odonyms of the quartiere can be categorized as follows:

- Cities, e.g. Piazza and Via Alessandria, Via Ancona, Via Bergamo, Via Brescia, Via Cagliari, Piazza Fiume, Via Nizza, Via Rieti, Via Viterbo, Via Velletri;
- Fallen in the Capture of Rome, e.g. Via Cesare Bosi, Via Giacomo Pagliari, Via Cesare Paoletti, Via Andrea Ripa;
- Local names, e.g. Via di Villa Albani, Via Nomentana, Via Salaria;
- Rivers, e.g. Via Adda, Via Basento, Via Metauro, Via Ofanto, Via Po, Via Simeto, Via Tirso, Via Trebbia.

== History ==
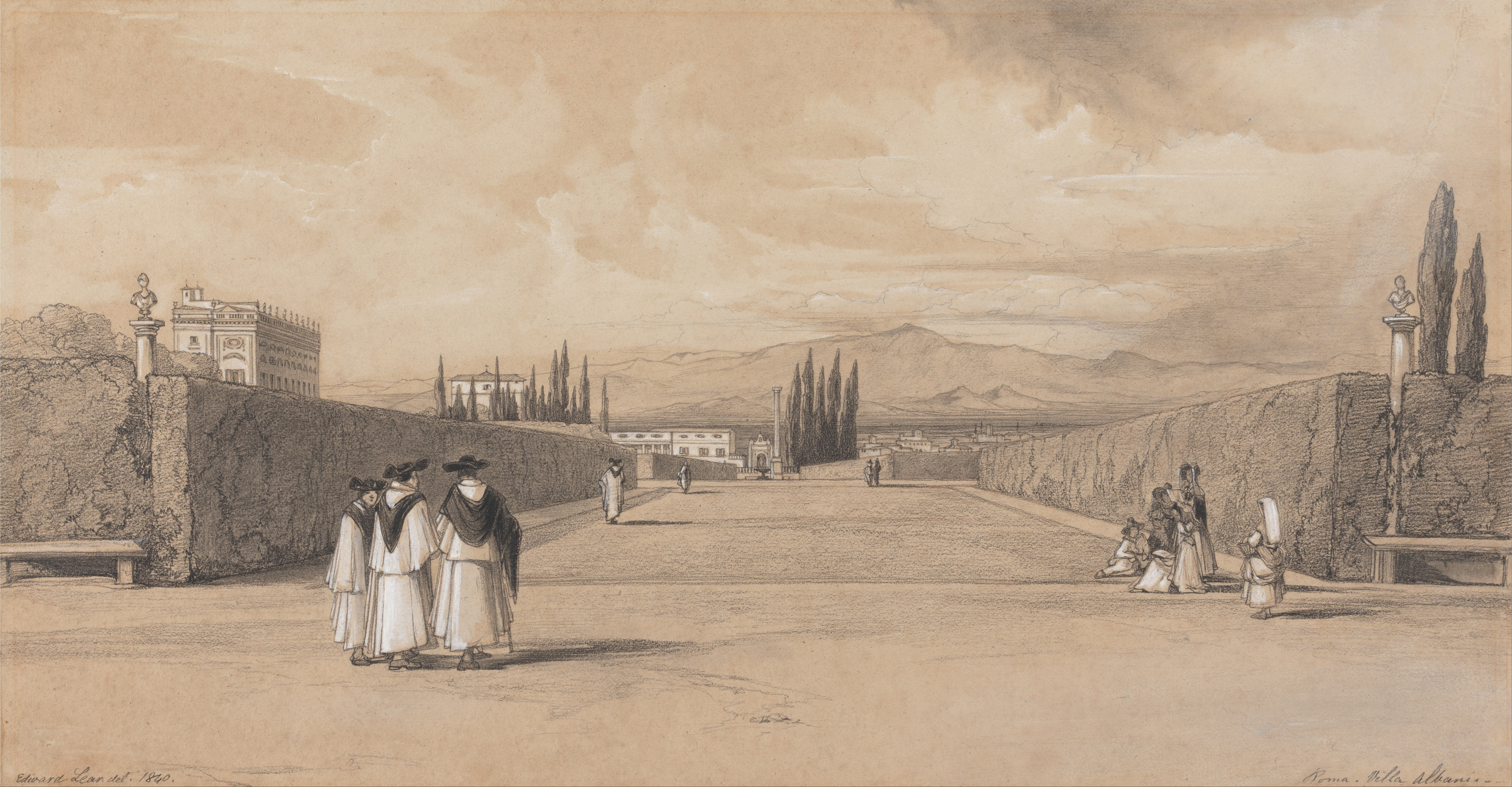
"The gardens of the Villa Albani" by Edward Lear, 1840.

Salario is among the first 15 quartieri born in 1911 and officially established in 1921. In 1926 it was reduced following the establishment of the Quarter Q. XVII Savoia (currently Trieste).

The territory immediately outside Porta Pia remained a rural area until the end of the 19th century, like all the areas outside the Aurelian walls then known as "suburbia".

The area, crossed by Via Nomentana and Via Salaria, which originate from there, hosted hunting lodges and country residences since the 18th century, such as Villa Albani – still existing today and whose park occupies a good quarter of the territory – and Villa Patrizi (in the quarter Nomentano). The latter stood immediately outside Porta Pia and was sacrificed to the needs of urban expansion of Rome after the unification of Italy. The site is now occupied by the Ministry of Transport.

The first building activities on the new allotments outside the Aurelian walls began outside Porta Pia and Porta Salaria as early as the last two decades of the 19th century. However, it was only in 1911 that the city administration sanctioned the birth of the new quarters, making them official in 1921. The area of the quarter Salario was included within the territory defined by Porta Pia and Porta Salaria up to the bridge over the Aniene and the left bank of the same river.

This territorial delimitation was then revised in 1926 with the establishment of the quarter Savoia (the current quarter Trieste), which included all the areas beyond the current Viale Regina Margherita, thus reducing in a relevant way the area of the quarter Salario.

=== Coat of arms ===
Azure, argent pale with or rising sun.

== Monuments and places of interest ==
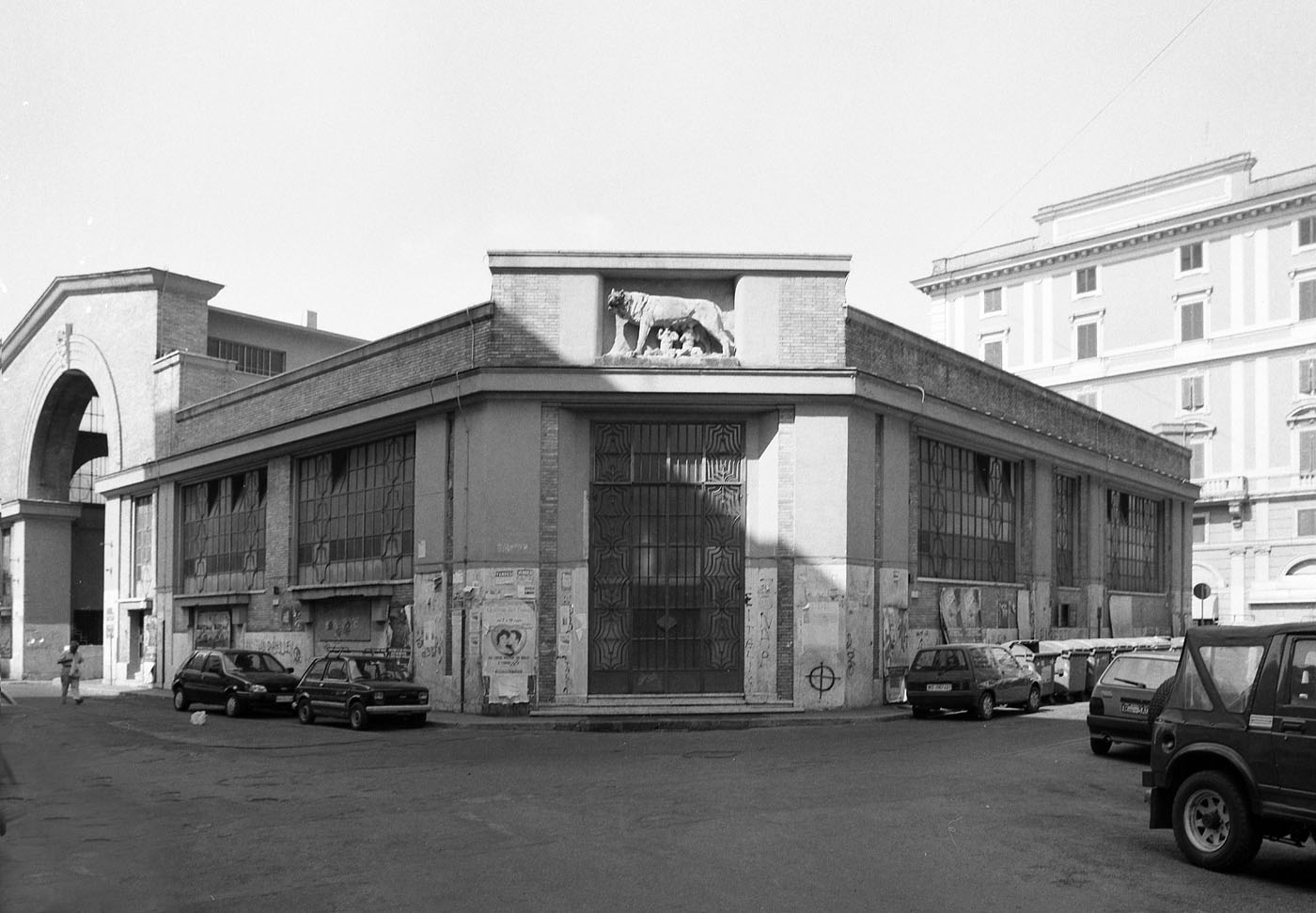
The market hall in Via Alessandria

=== Civil buildings ===
- Former Peroni brewery. 19th-century complex of buildings (1864). 41.912543°N 12.502280°E

A complex of three lots of buildings distributed between Via Nizza and Via Alessandria. The factory was dismissed in 1971.

- Palace by Marcello Piacentini, in Via Savoia. 20th-century building in the typical 1920s style known as Barocchetto romano (1918–20).
- Mercato Nomentano, in Piazza Alessandria. 20th-century building in Stile Umbertino (1929). 41.911252°N 12.501587°E

Project by Elena Luzzatto; renovated in 2016 as part of the project "Mercati d'Autore", promoted by Apre Roma.

=== Religious buildings ===
- Santa Maria della Mercede e Sant'Adriano, in Viale Regina Margherita.

=== Archaeological sites ===
- Catacomb of Felicitas, in via Salaria.

=== Villas and parks ===
- Villa Albani

== Culture ==
=== Museums ===
- Museum of Contemporary Art of Rome (MACRO), in Via Nizza.
- Galleria d'arte moderna di Roma Capitale, in Via Reggio Emilia

=== Libraries ===
- Library of the Centro Ricerca e Documentazione Arti Visive, in Via Reggio Emilia.

== Bibliography ==
- Giorgio Carpaneto; others (1997). I quartieri di Roma. Rome: Newton Compton Editori.
- Giorgio Carpaneto (1991). "QUARTIERE IV. SALARIO". I Rioni e i Quartieri di Roma. Vol. 6. Rome: Newton Compton Editori.
- Carlo Pietrangeli (1953). "Insegne e stemmi dei rioni di Roma" (PDF). Capitolium. Rassegna di attività municipali. year XXVIII (6). Rome: Tumminelli – Istituto Romano di Arti Grafiche.
- Claudio Rendina; Donatella Paradisi (2004). Le strade di Roma. Vol. 1. Rome: Newton Compton Editori.
- Claudio Rendina (2006). I quartieri di Roma. Vol. 1. Rome: Newton Compton Editori.
