= Rothenbachkopf =

Mountain in France

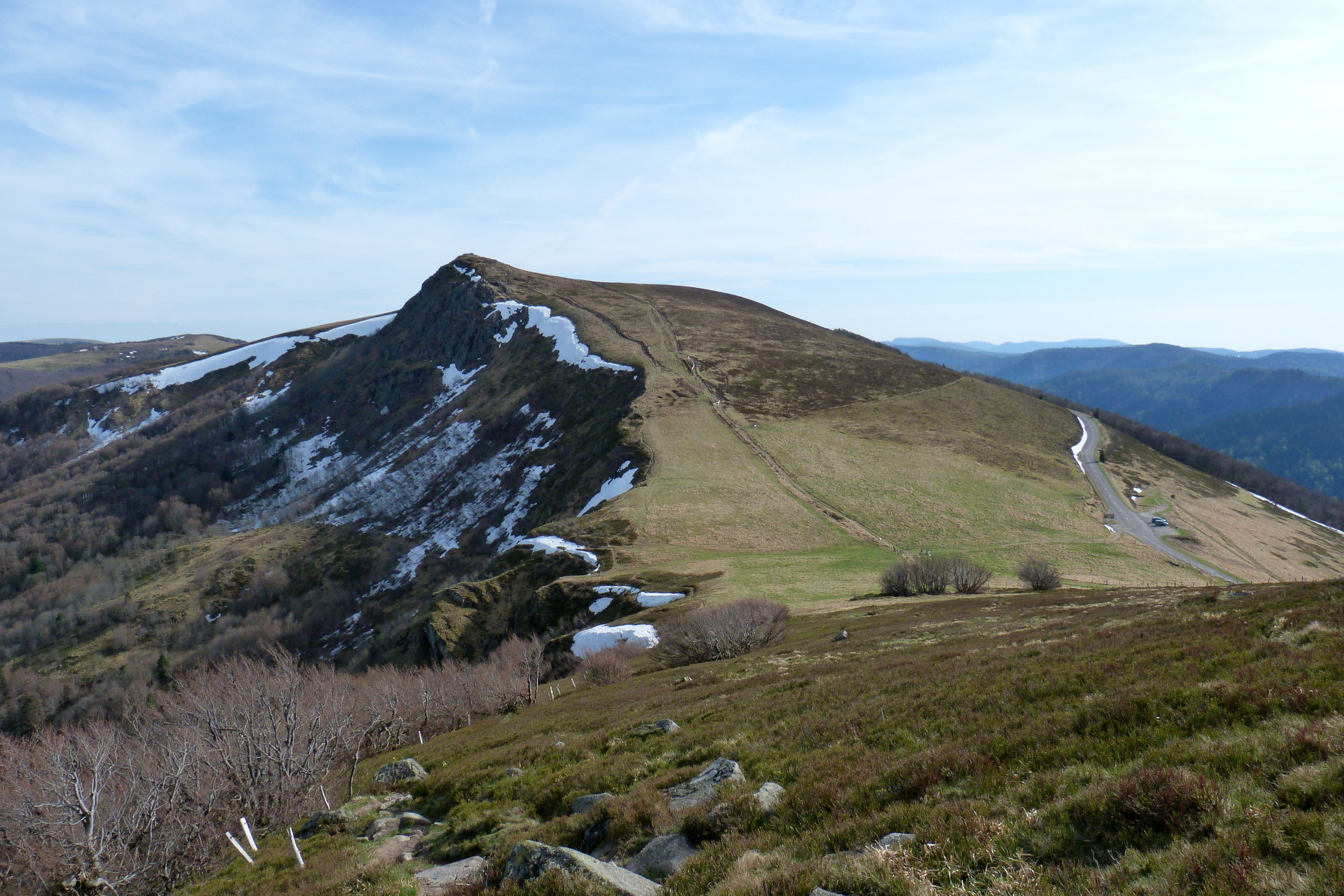
- The Rothenbachkopf from the north

Highest point
- Elevation: 1,315 m (4,314 ft)
- Coordinates: 48°00′04″N 6°58′50″E

Geography
- Location within France
- Parent range: Vosges

The Rothenbachkopf is a mountain, 1,315 metres high, in the High Vosges in France. Only a few metres to the west of the summit runs the Route des Crêtes heading south from the Col de la Schlucht. Several Vosges Club hiking trails run over the top. A few kilometres north of the Rothenbachkopfs the border between Alsace and Lorraine turns and heads southwest.

The summit ridge is used as a cross-country ski course for the crossing of the Vosges mountains. Great care is recommended in winter because of the cornices, the possible fog and the violent and icy winds that can occur. On 28 December 1965, two inexperienced young German hikers, became lost in the fog and cold and died on the Rothenbachkopf.

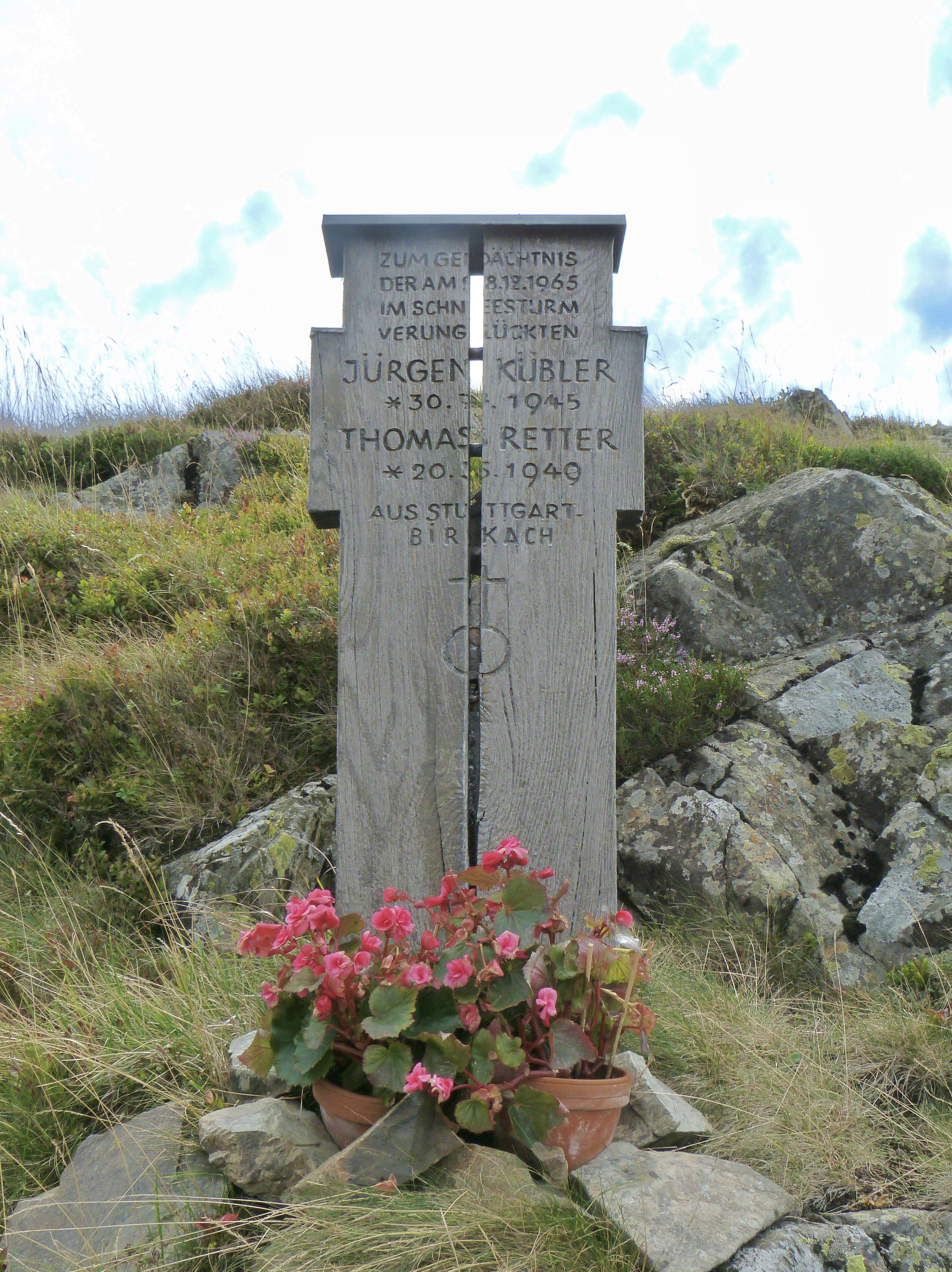
Monument near the summit, in memory of Jürgen Kübler and Thomas Retter, victims of bad weather on 28 December 1965.

== Mapping ==
Cartes IGN 31 (Série verte): St-Dié – Mulhouse – Bâle, 1:100.000, Edition 8, Institut Géographique Nationale, Paris, 1990
