= Casino di Villa Boncompagni Ludovisi =

Historical building in Rome, Italy

Coordinates: 41.9074°N 12.4875°E

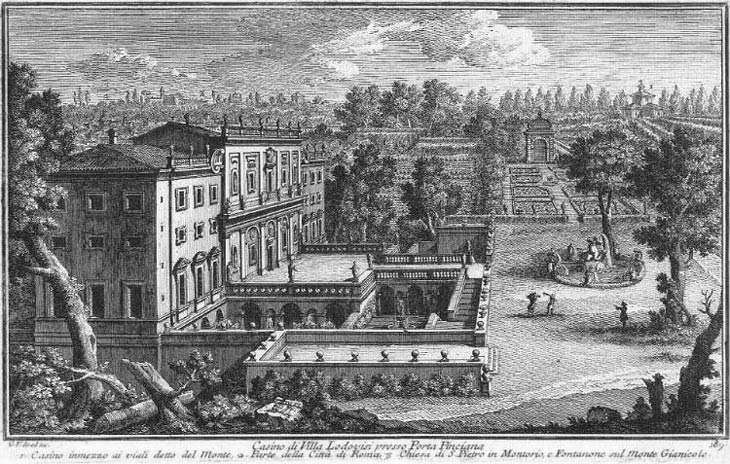
- The Casino di Villa Ludovisi (1761) by Giuseppe Vasi, within its extensive grounds

General information
- Location: Rome, Italy

Casino di Villa Boncompagni Ludovisi is a historical building in Rione Ludovisi, Rome, Italy. The building is located in the former domain Villa Ludovisi.

The building is often referred to as Villa Aurora or Casino dell'Aurora, after the fresco by Guercino in the main reception hall, depicting the eponymous goddess.

== History ==
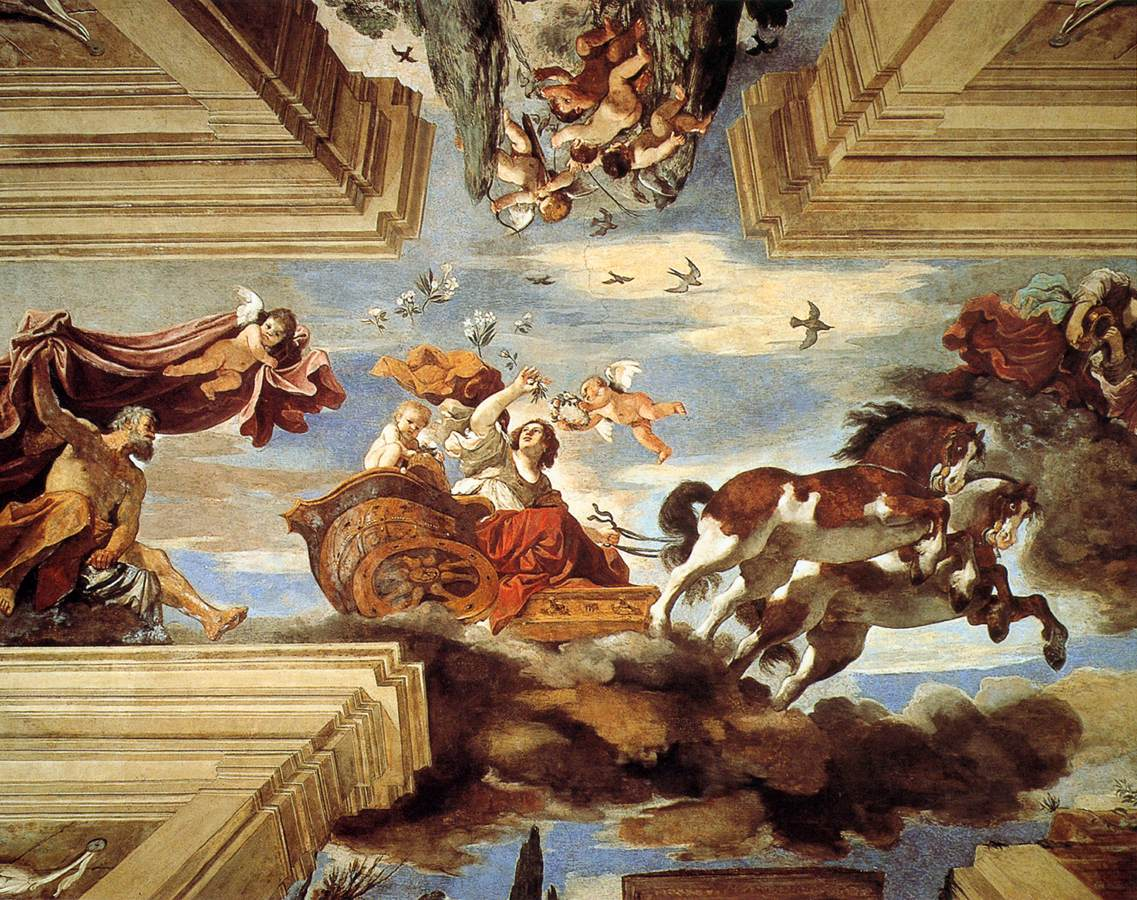
Aurora (1621) by Guercino, after which the villa is often referred to, in the main reception hall

The palace represents the only remnant of a much larger suburban retreat established in the 16th century by Cardinal Francesco Maria Del Monte (1549–1627). The Cardinal was a diplomat, intellectual, art connoisseur, and collector, protector and patron of famous figures such as Galileo Galilei and Caravaggio. One of the smaller rooms of the Casino boasts the only painting ever executed by Caravaggio on a ceiling, Jupiter, Neptune and Pluto (c. 1597), which reflects, in symbolic imagery derived from Classical mythology, another of the cardinal's interests: alchemy.

In 1621, del Monte sold the villa and its extensive grounds to Ludovico Ludovisi, whose uncle Alessandro Ludovisi had assumed the papacy earlier that year as Pope Gregory XV and made his nephew a cardinal the day after his coronation, at the age of 25. The cardinal expanded the property until he had created a 30 hectares (74 acres) park between the Porta Pinciana, the Porta Salaria and the convent of Sant'Isidoro, whose buildings were designed by Domenichino, with gardens (purportedly designed by André Le Nôtre), of which Henry James wrote in Portrait of Places (1883):

"Certainly there is nothing better in Rome, and perhaps nothing so beautiful ... Inside there is everything: dark avenues shaped for centuries with scissors, valleys, clearings, groves ..."

The princes Boncompagni-Ludovisi, heirs to the celebrated property and its vast collections, subdivided and sold the property in 1883. Rome's Ludovisi district was built on the land where the park had been and bears the coat of arms of the family. Of the historic buildings of the villa, only the Casino and the facade and staircase of the former Palazzo Grande remain, the latter now hidden behind what became the 19th-century Palazzo Margherita after it was acquired by the Italian State as a residence for the Queen consort of Italy, Margherita of Savoy. It now houses the U.S. embassy. Meanwhile, the 2,200 square metres (24,000 sq ft) Villa Aurora and a small parcel of land remained in the possession of the Ludovisi family. Apart from the works by Caravaggio and Guercino, it contains important works of art by Pomarancio, Michelangelo, and a collection of Roman and Greek artefacts. Encircled by high walls, it was occasionally opened to the public once a month or upon written request.

A free virtual tour led by Princess Rita Boncompagni Ludovisi was made available in January 2022.

== Intended sale ==
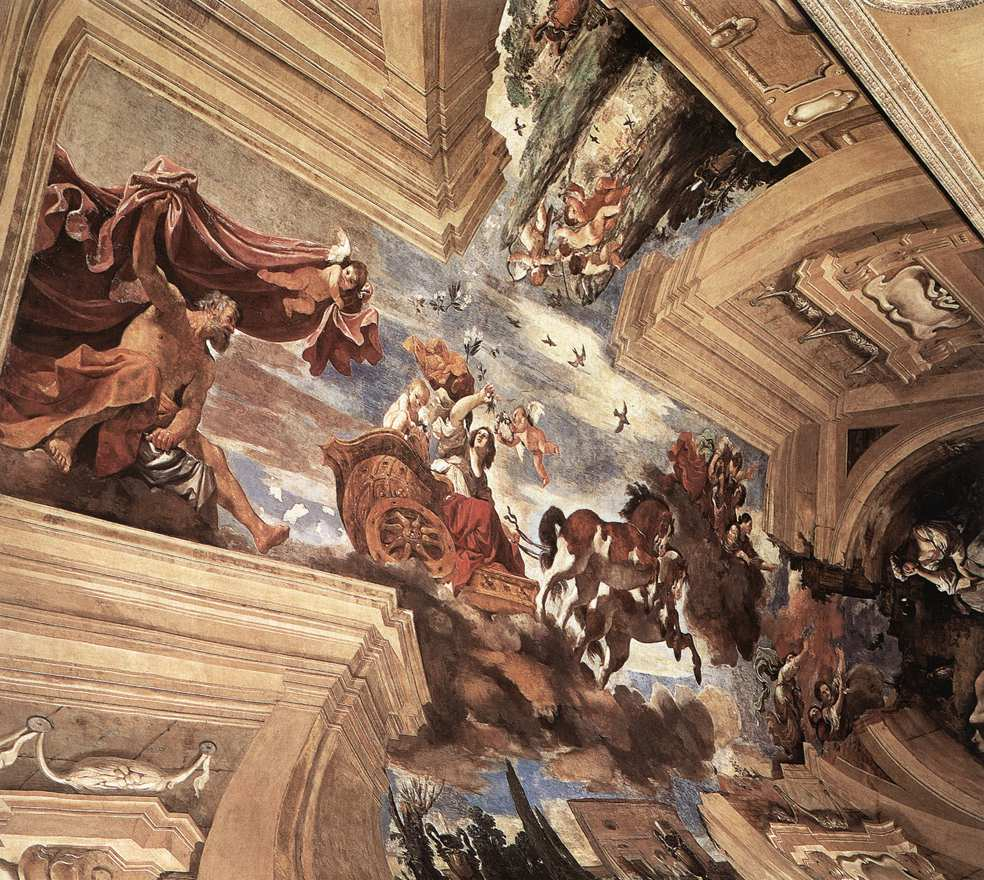
Alternate view of Aurora

The property was put up for sale in 2021 after the death of its owner, Prince Nicolò Boncompagni Ludovisi, in 2018, followed by an inheritance dispute between his widow, Princess Rita Boncompagni Ludovisi, and his three sons.

The villa, which requires an estimated 10 million euros of restoration work, was put up for auction by a notary on 18 January 2022, with bidding to start at €471 million; there were no offers. Ultimately the villa had been offered for sale five times by January 2023 with opening bid ultimately reduced to €145m, but with no bids. A judge ruled that the property was not being properly maintained after the collapse of a wall, and that Princess Rita, who was living in the villa, had organised unauthorised tours—she denied that. He ordered her to vacate the property within 60 days, but she refused. A further auction was scheduled for April 2023. On 20 April 2023, Princess Rita was evicted from the premises.
