= Villa Ludovisi =

Villa in Rome, Italy

The Villa Ludovisi was a suburban villa in Rome, built in the 17th century on the area once occupied by the Gardens of Sallust (Horti Sallustiani) near the Porta Salaria. On an assemblage of vineyards purchased from Giovanni Antonio Orsini, Cardinal Francesco Maria Del Monte and others, Cardinal Ludovico Ludovisi erected in the 1620s the main villa building to designs by Domenichino; it was completed within thirty months, in part to house his collection of Roman antiquities, additions to which were unearthed during construction at the site, which had figured among the great patrician pleasure grounds of Roman times. Modern works, most famously Gian Lorenzo Bernini's Pluto and Persephone, were also represented. The engraving of the grounds by Giovanni Battista Falda (1683) shows a short access avenue from a tree-lined exedra in via di Porta Pinciana and cypress-lined avenues centered on each of the facades of the main villa, laid out through open fields, the main approaches to both the villa and the Casino dell'Aurora converging on gates in the Aurelian Walls, which formed the northern bounds of the park; symmetrical parterres of conventional form including bosquets peopled with statuary flanked the main avenue of the Casina, and there was an isolated sunken parterre, though these features were not integrated in a unified overall plan. The overgrown avenues contrasting with the dramatic Roman walls inspired Stendhal to declare in 1828 that the Villa Ludovisi's gardens were among the most beautiful in the world.

Frescoes in the villa were carried out by Domenichino, Guercino, Giovambattista Viola, and others. A casina was added, largely to house the Cardinal's growing collection of Roman sculptures and inscriptions, which Alessandro Algardi treated to sometimes extensive restoration.

The villa passed to the ownership of the Boncompagni Ludovisi family, which in 1872 rented it to King Victor Emmanuel II. The King used the villa as residence for his lover, Rosa Vercellana.

İn 1885, despite great protests among the intellectuals, its last owner, Don Rodolfo Boncompagni Ludovisi, the Prince of Piombino, faced serious financial troubles and decided to sell the property to the Società Generale Immobiliare. The Villa was divided into building lots. The sculptures were dispersed, and most of the buildings destroyed, the only one to remain being the Casino dell'Aurora.

The Via Veneto was constructed through the former grounds, part of which are occupied by the American Embassy in Palazzo Margherita, and the Rione Ludovisi took shape, borrowing its name from the cardinal and his villa.

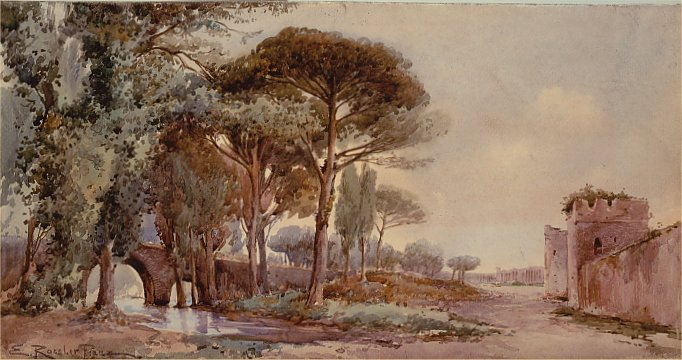
The gardens of the Villa and the Aurelian Walls in the early 1880s, in a painting of Ettore Roesler Franz

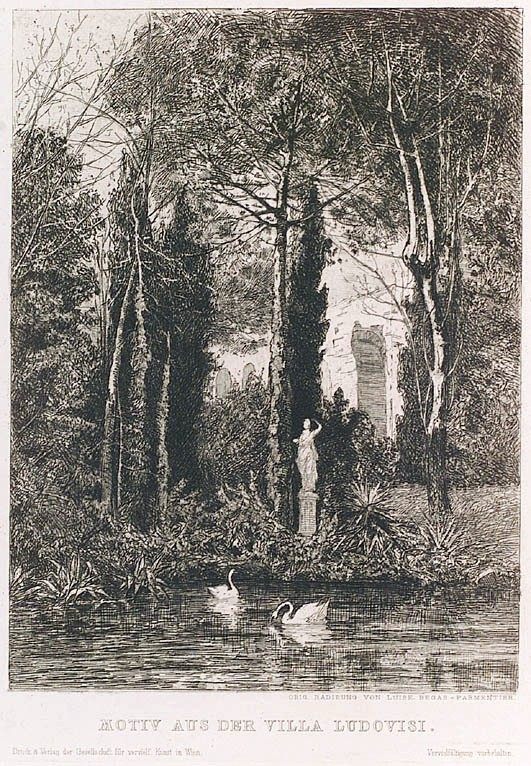
The Villa gardens, by Luise Begas-Parmentier

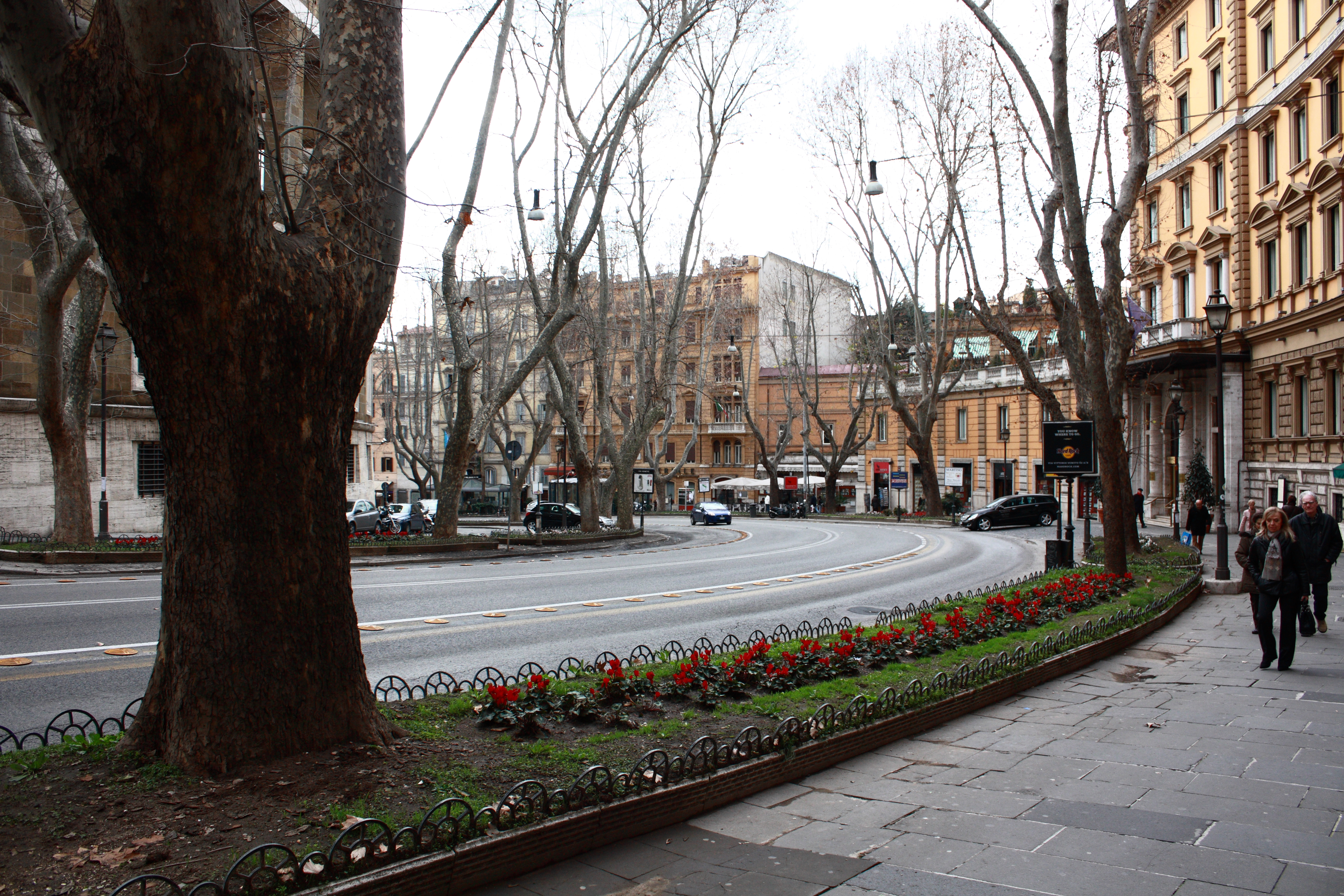
Fashionable Via Veneto was built in the middle of Villa Ludovisi's park.
