= Wildenstein =

Commune in Grand Est, France

- Commune
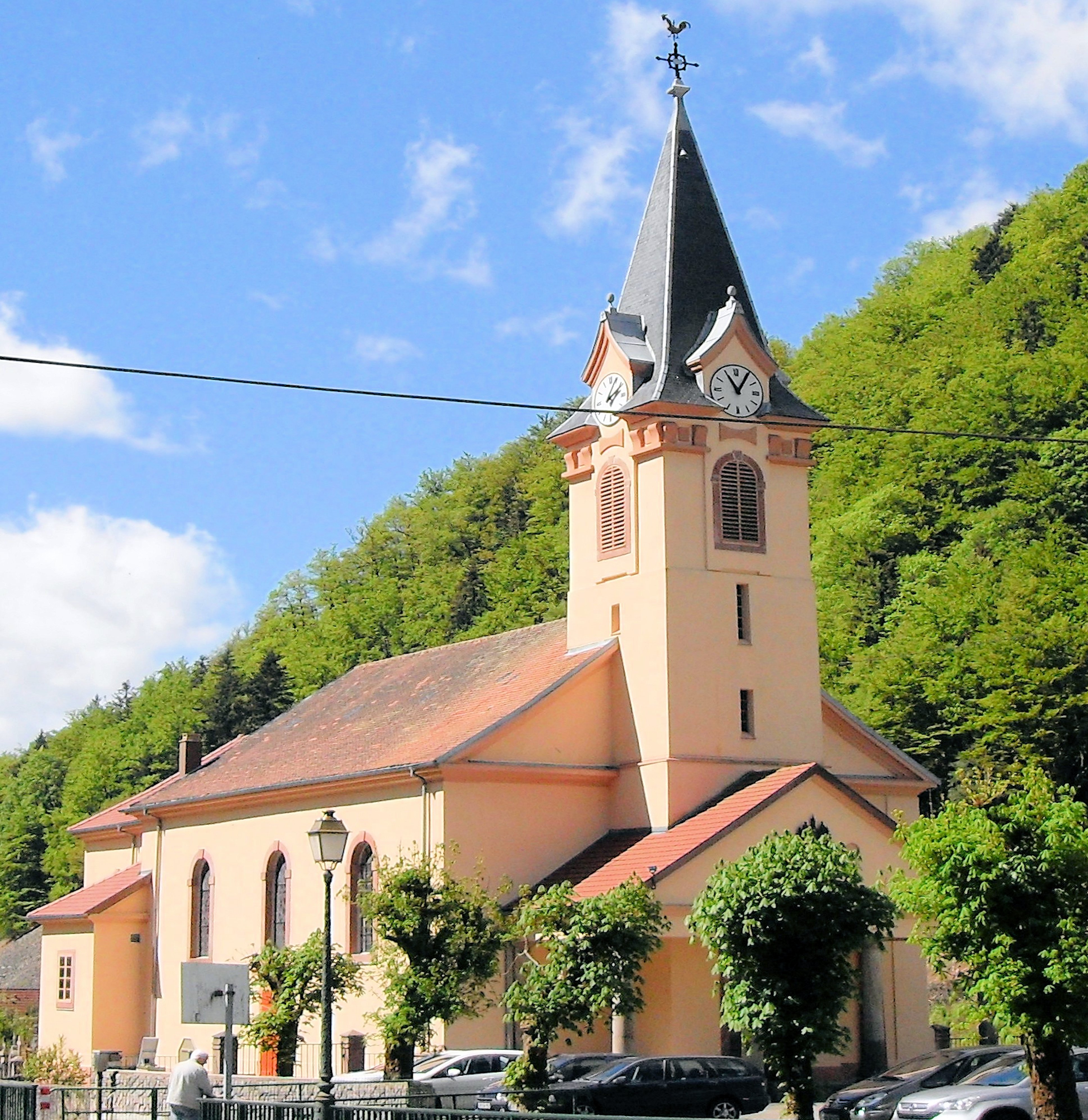
- The church in Wildenstein

- Coat of arms
- Location of Wildenstein
- Location within France Location within Grand Est
- Coordinates: 47°58′41″N 6°57′41″E
- Country: France
- Region: Grand Est
- Department: Haut-Rhin
- Arrondissement: Thann-Guebwiller
- Canton: Cernay
- Intercommunality: Vallée de Saint-Amarin

Government
  - Mayor (2020–2026): Ludovic Marinoni
- Area^{1}: 9.86 km^{2} (3.81 sq mi)
- Elevation: 580 m (1,900 ft)
- Highest elevation: 1,303 m (4,275 ft)
- Lowest elevation: 547 m (1,795 ft)
- Population (2023): 155
  - Density: 15.7/km^{2} (40.7/sq mi)
- Time zone: UTC+01:00 (CET)
  - Summer (DST): UTC+02:00 (CEST)
- INSEE/Postal code: 68370 /68820
- ^{1} French Land Register data, which excludes lakes, ponds, glaciers > 1 km^{2} (0.386 sq mi or 247 acres) and river estuaries.

Wildenstein (French pronunciation: [vildənʃtain]) is a commune in the Haut-Rhin department in Grand Est in north-eastern France.

== Geography ==
Wildenstein is the highest village in the Thur Valley. The houses cluster along the main street, nestled between the steep slopes of the Altenberg to the west (1,197 m) and the Batteriekopf to the east (1,311 m). A section of the Route des Crêtes encroaches on the municipal territory without direct access from the center.

== Population ==
Historical population
Year	Pop.	±% p.a.
1968	241	—
1975	168	−5.02%
1982	205	+2.88%
1990	189	−1.01%
1999	211	+1.23%
2007	197	−0.85%
2012	192	−0.51%
2017	180	−1.28%
2023	155	−2.46%
Source: INSEE

== See also ==
- Communes of the Haut-Rhin department
