= Palazzo Margherita =

Coordinates: 41.9068°N 12.4908°E

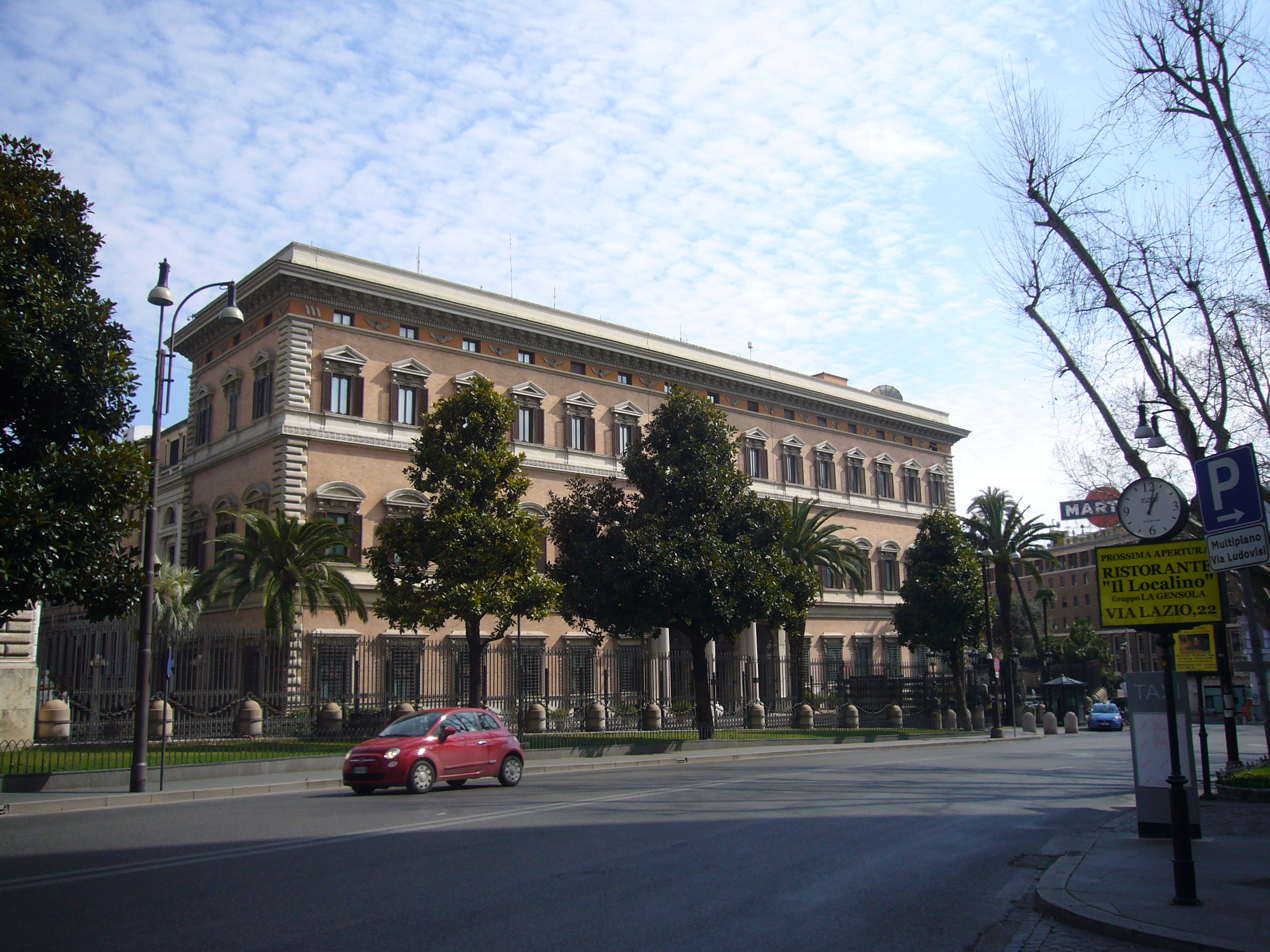
- Former names: Palazzo Piombino

General information
- Status: In use
- Architectural style: Cinquecentesimo (Renaissance Revival)
- Location: Via Vittorio Veneto 121, Rome, Italy
- Current tenants: US
- Named for: Margherita of Savoy
- Construction started: 1886
- Completed: 1890
- Client: Don Rodolfo Boncompagni Ludovisi
- Owner: US Government

Design and construction
- Architect: Gaetano Koch

Palazzo Margherita, formerly Palazzo Piombino, is a palazzo on Via Veneto in Rome. The usual name references Queen Margherita of Savoy, who lived there from 1900 to 1926.

In 1885, the Boncompagni-Ludovisi family chose to sell their ancestral family home in response to a severe financial crisis. The Villa Ludovisi and most of its extensive grounds were sold in 1883 to a property developer, the Società Generale Immobiliare, which in 1885 divided the property into luxury building lots. The family retained a small portion of the original estate around the Casino di Villa Boncompagni Ludovisi (Villa Aurora), the only building from the original holdings that was not demolished. However, the Casino was not designed to be the primary family home of a noble family.

The Palazzo Piombino was built from 1886 to 1890 by Gaetano Koch for Rodolfo Boncompagni Ludovisi, titular Prince of Piombino, as a new palace for the Boncompagni-Ludovisi family. It occupied one of the new developer lots at a prominent location along the Via Veneto, the new main road that developers had built through the former Villa property. The Boncompagni-Ludovisi family occupied the house for barely a decade before being forced to sell it in 1900 due to further economic difficulties, including some due to the high cost of the new palazzo itself.

After the assassination of King Umberto I in Monza in 1900, his son and successor King Victor Emmanuel III purchased the palazzo from the family as a suitable residence for the newly widowed Queen Margherita, who took up residence in the palazzo on Christmas Day, 1900 for the remaining 26 years of her life. She remained active in public life in her roles as queen dowager and queen mother, and the building in which she lived become known as Palazzo Margherita.

After her death, the building was divided into offices for the Mussolini government. In 1946, the US government purchased the palazzo from the Italian government, and it now houses the United States Embassy in Italy. The palazzo was extensively renovated between 1949 and 1952 to restore rooms to their earlier appearance, while also modernizing plumbing and heating systems and increasing office space. The palazzo is now protected both by Italian law for cultural heritage and by listing on the US Department of State Register of Culturally Significant Property.

== Additional images ==
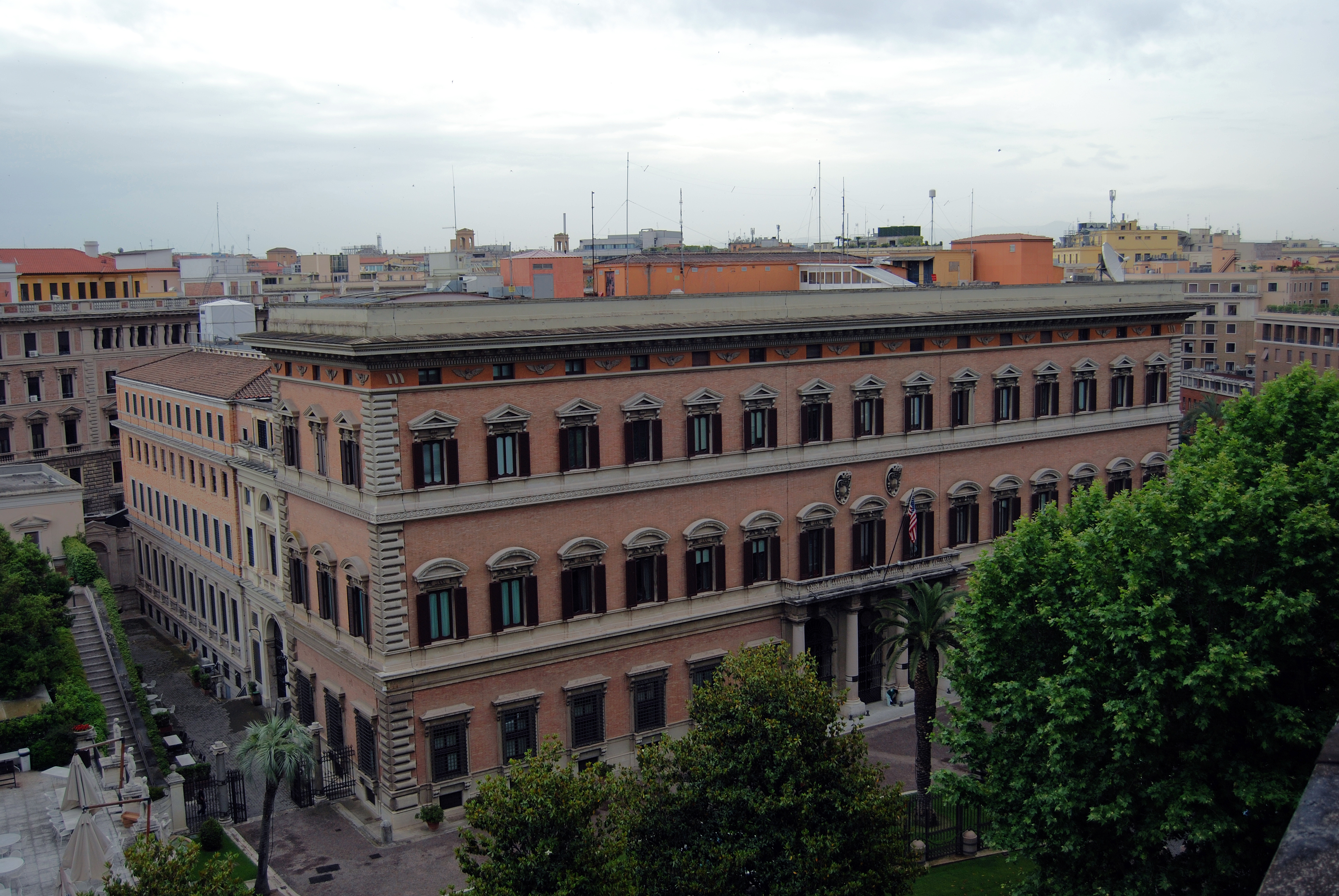
From above

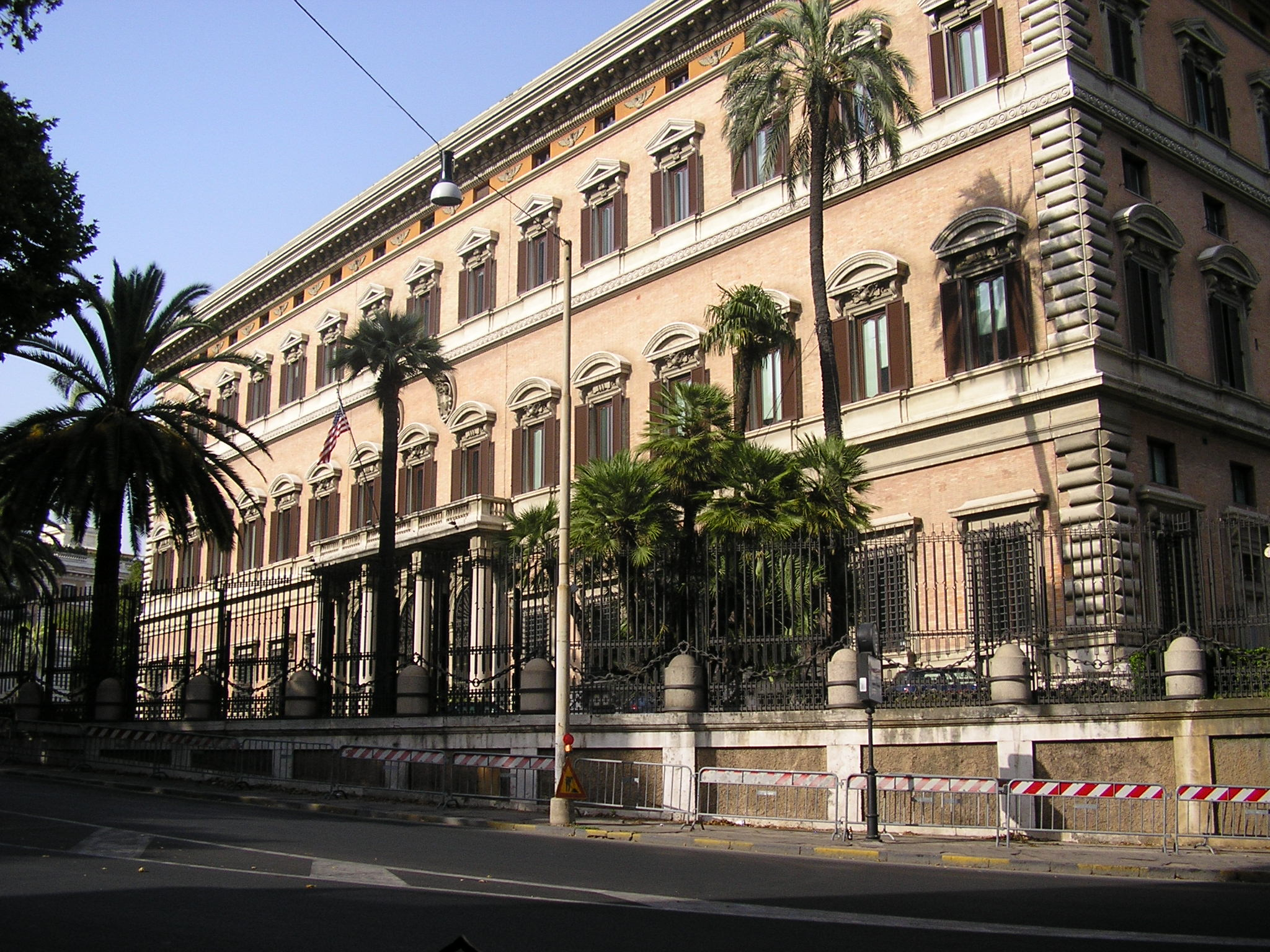
Near view from southwest

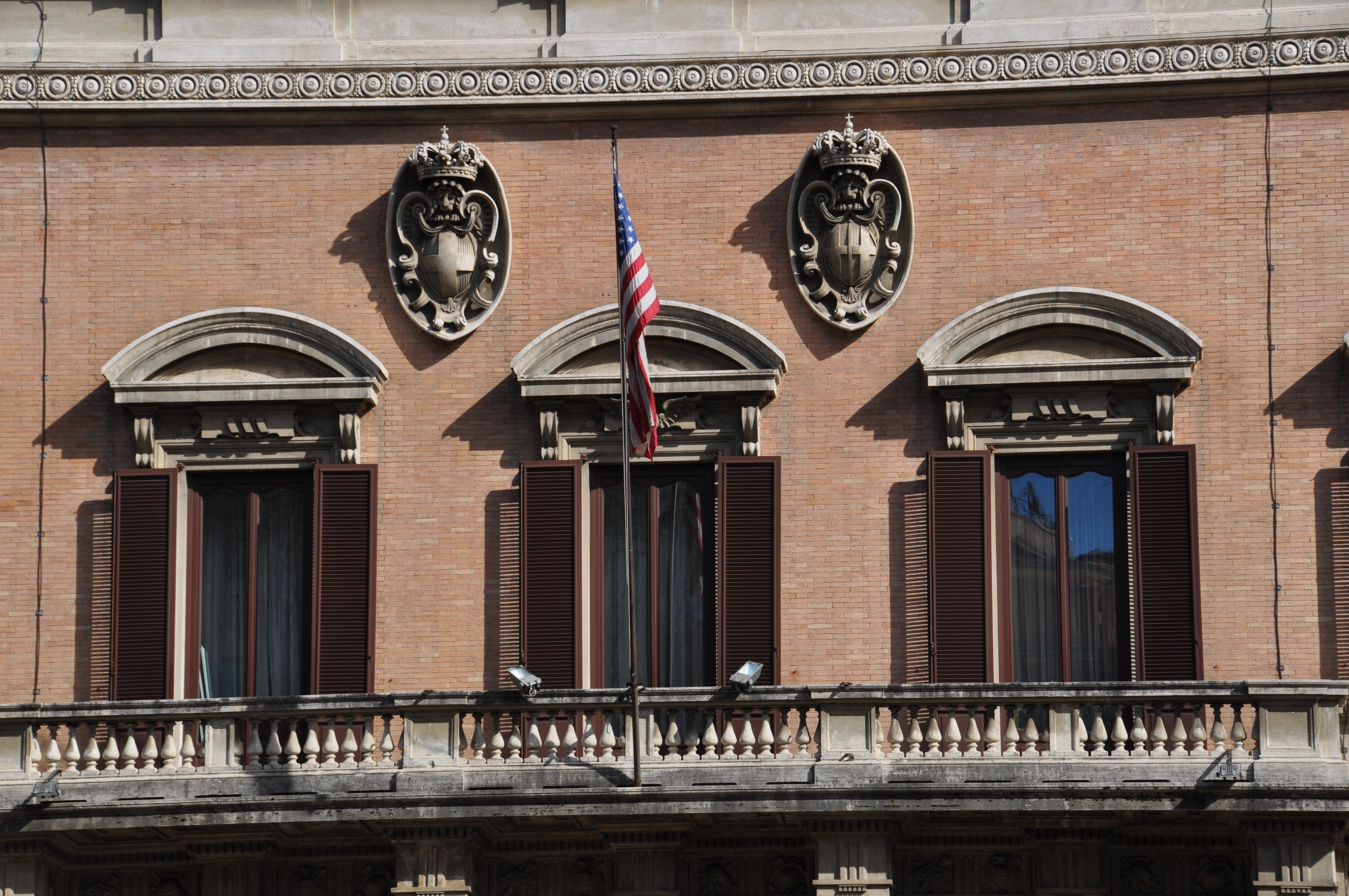
The coat of arms of the King and the Queen of Italy
