= Ludovisi =

Ludovisi can refer to:

- Ludovisi (family), a noble Italian family
  - Ludovisi papacy of Pope Gregory XV
  - Cardinals Ludovisi
    - Cardinal Alessandro Ludovisi, later Pope Gregory XV
      - Cardinal Ludovico Ludovisi (the Pope's Cardinal Nephew and Orazio's son)
      - Cardinal Niccolò Albergati-Ludovisi (Ludovico's cousin), Prince of Piombino
  - Non-ecclesiastic family members
    - Orazio Ludovisi (Pope Gregory XV's brother), Italian military commander and patrician of Bologna
      - Niccolò Ludovisi (Orazio's son), Prince of Piombino
        - Giovan Battista Ludovisi (Niccolò's son), Prince of Piombino
        - Olimpia Ludovisi (Niccolò's daughter and grand-niece of two popes)
        - Ippolita Ludovisi (Niccolò's daughter and grand-niece of two popes)
  - Villa Ludovisi, a suburban villa in Rome, built in the 17th century for Cardinal Ludovico, destroyed in the 19th century; its territory becoming the Ludovisi rione.
    - Casino di Villa Boncompagni Ludovisi, a remaining portion of the villa, now housing the U.S. Embassy in Italy
    - Palazzo Boncompagni Ludovisi, a remaining portion of the villa
    - Juno Ludovisi, a colossal Roman marble head from a statue of Antonia Minor as the goddess Juno
    - Ludovisi Dionysus, a Roman work of the 2nd century CE, first displayed in front of the Palazzo Grande, at the Villa Ludovisi
    - Ludovisi Ares, an Antonine Roman marble sculpture of Mars
    - Ludovisi Gaul, a Roman marble group depicting a man in the act of plunging a sword into his breast
- Audoenus Ludovisi (Owen Lewis; 1532-1594), Welsh Roman Catholic jurist, administrator, diplomat, and Bishop of Cassano all'Jonio
- Francesco Boncompagni Ludovisi (1886–1955), Italian politician
- Felice Ludovisi (1912-20), Italian architect and academici
- Ludovisi, Lazio, the XVI rione in the City of Rome
- Boncompagni Ludovisi Decorative Art Museum, a National Gallery of Modern Art in rome, Italy
- Palazzo Ludovisi, a palace in Rome also built for Cardinal Ludovico; now the seat of the Italian Chamber of Deputies
- Ludovisi Throne, a sculpted block of white marble hollowed at the back and carved with bas-reliefs on the three outer faces, from about 460 BCE
- Great Ludovisi sarcophagus, an ancient Roman sarcophagus dating to around 250–260 AD
