= Olimpia Ludovisi =

Princess of Poimbino
- Reign: 1700 - 27 November 1700
- Predecessor: Niccolo II Ludovisi
- Successor: Ippolita I Ludovisi
- Born: 1656
- Died: 27 November 1700 (aged 43–44)
- House: Ludovisi
- Father: Niccolò I Ludovisi
- Mother: Constanza Pamphili, Princess of San Martino and Alviano

Olimpia Ludovisi (1656 – 27 November 1700) was the ruling Princess of Piombino, Marchioness of Populonia, Princess of Venosa and Countess of Conza, Lady di Scarlino, Populonia, Vignale, Abbadia del Fango, Suvereto, Buriano, Cerboli e Palmaiolan, and Lady princess of the Tuscan Archipelago including the islands of Elba, Montecristo, Pianosa, Gorgona, Capraia, and Isola del Giglio in 1700.

== Life ==
She was the eldest daughter of Niccolò Ludovisi and his third wife Costanza Pamphili, sister of Vatican cardinal Camillo Pamphili. Through her mother she was the maternal grand-niece of Pope Innocent X and the paternal grand-niece of Pope Gregory XV, and the cousin of Olimpia Aldobrandini.

Unlike her two sisters Lavinia and Ippolita, Olimpia did not marry, instead, she dedicated her life to the church as a nun. In 1699, Olimpia's older brother Giovan Battista Ludovisi died and left his estate to his newborn son Niccolo under the regency of his widow Anna Maria Arduino. However, the young child died in 1700 and Olimpia succeeded in being the closest surviving paternal relative.

Olimpia inherited all fiefs including Piombino. She was the second Princess of Piombino to rule in her own right after Isabella Appiani. Olimpia remained a nun after her accession.

Olimpia only reigned for several months until she died on 27 November 1700. Since she left no issues or children, the succession passed to her only surviving sibling Ippolita.

Preceded by Niccolo II Ludovisi	Princess of Piombino; 1700	Succeeded by Ippolita Ludovisi
