= Virginio Orsini (cardinal) =

Italian Cardinal

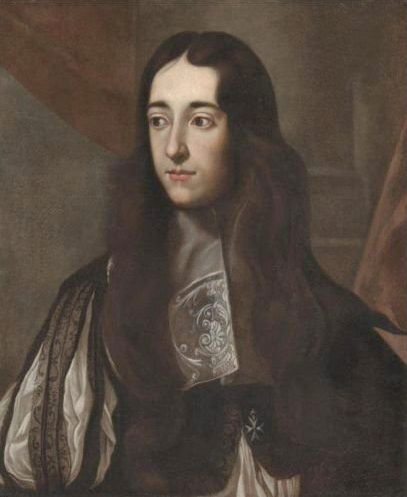

Virginio Orsini (1615 – 21 August 1676) was an Italian Cardinal.

He belonged to the ducal family of Bracciano, He renounced his birthright in his youth, entered the military order of the Knights of Malta and distinguished himself in battle against the Ottoman Empire during the Thirty Years' War.

He had plans to marry Ippolita Ludovisi (daughter of Orazio Ludovisi, sister of Niccolò Ludovisi and a niece of Pope Gregory XV) but Pope Urban VIII had no desire for the marriage to go ahead. Instead, in December 1641, the Pope raised him to the dignity of cardinal, and appointed him Protector of the Polish as well as of the Portuguese Orient. He was commissioned to direct the building of the new fortifications with which Urban VIII enclosed the Leonine City and a quarter of Trastevere.

In 1675, he became Cardinal Bishop of Frascati.
