= Olimpia Aldobrandini =

Member of the Aldobrandini family of Rome

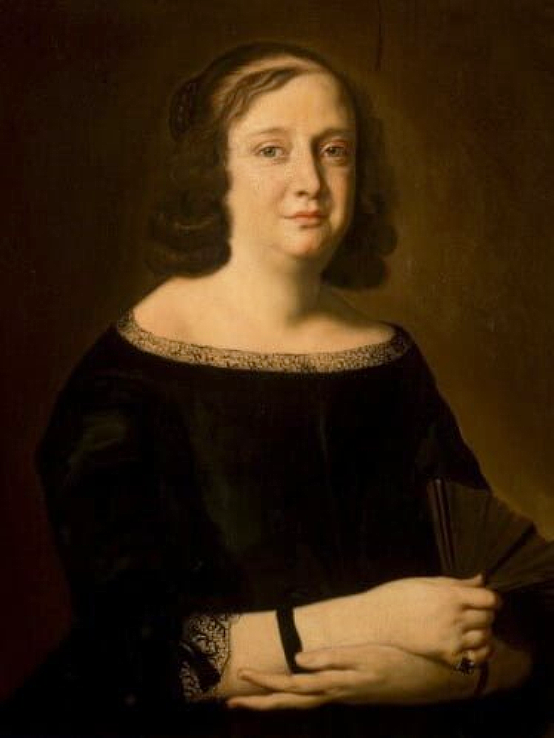
Olimpia Aldobrandini

Coat of Arms of Aldobrandini family

Olimpia Aldobrandini (20 April 1623 – 18 December 1681) was a rich and powerful Italian noblewoman. By birth, she was member of an old and influential Aldobrandini family of Rome, and the sole heiress to the great family fortune.

== Early life and ancestry ==
Olimpia Aldobrandini was born on 20 April 1623, the daughter of Giorgio Aldobrandini, Prince of Meldola, Sarsina and Rossano, nephew of Pope Clement VIII, and his wife, Ippolita Ludovisi (daughter of Orazio Ludovisi, Duke of Fiano, sister of Niccolò Ludovisi, Duke of Zagarolo, and a niece of Pope Gregory XV).

== Marriages ==
In 1638, she married Prince Paolo Borghese of the Borghese family who died in 1646 and had issue; four sons and one daughter.

The following year after the death of her husband, in 1647, she married Camillo Pamphili (son of Olimpia Maidalchini and nephew of Pope Innocent X) who renounced a cardinalate to become her husband.

Part of her dowry of her second marriage was a collection of paintings (including masterpieces removed from the Duke of Ferrara's "Camerino d’Alabastro"), villas in Montemagnanapoli and Frascati, the great Aldobrandini estates in Romagna on the Corso in Rome and the Palazzo Aldobrandini.

These estates and property thus passed to the House of Pamphili and became the nucleus for the Galleria Doria Pamphilj.

Aldobrandini and Camillo Pamphili had five children including Giovan Battista Pamphili, Benedetto Pamphili and Anna Pamphili who married the Genoese nobleman Giovanni Andrea III Doria-Pamphili-Landi in 1671. When the Roman branch of the Pamphlili family ended in 1760, it was the descendants of Anna and Giovanni who inherited the palazzo in Rome.

== Issue ==
Children with Prince Borghese:

1. Giovanni Giorgio Borghese
2. Camillo Borghese
3. Francesco Borghese
4. Giovanni Battista Borghese, Principe Borghese (1639–1717), married Donna Eleonora Boncompagni, and had issue (including Camillo Borghese, Prince of Sulmona, husband of Pauline Bonaparte).
5. Maria Virginia Teresa Borghese (1642–1718), married Agostino Chigi, Prince of Farnese, Duke of Ariccia, and had issue.

Children with Pamphili:

1. Flaminia Pamphili (died 1709) married (1) Bernardino Savelli, Duke of Castelgandolfo, and had no children; married (2) Niccolò Francesco Pallavicini, Prince of Civitella, and had no children.
2. Teresa Pamphili (1650–1704), married Carlo II Cybo-Malaspina, Duke of Massa, and had children.
3. Anna Pamphili (1652–1728), married Giannandrea Doria, Prince of Melfi, and founded the Doria-Pamphili-Landi line.
4. Benedetto (1653–1730), cardinal.
5. Giambattista Pamphili, Prince of Carpinetti and of Belvedere (1648 – died 1717), married Violante Facchinetti and had a daughter Olimpia (1672–1731), who married Filippo Colonna, Prince of Paliano, son of Marie Mancini

== See also ==
- Pamphili family, with inclusive family tree.
