= Carlo Bovi =

Italian Roman Catholic prelate

Most Reverend Carlo Bovi
- Bishop of Sarsina
- Church: Catholic Church
- Diocese: Diocese of Sarsina
- In office: 1635–1646
- Predecessor: Amico Panici
- Successor: Caesar Reghini
- Previous post: Bishop of Bagnoregio (1622–1635).

Orders
- Consecration: 30 Jan 1622 by Ludovico Ludovisi

Personal details
- Born: 1576 Bologna, Italy
- Died: 24 Mar 1646 (age 70) Sarsina, Italy

Carlo Bovi (1576–1646) was a Roman Catholic prelate who served as Bishop of Sarsina (1635–1646) and Bishop of Bagnoregio (1622–1635).

== Biography ==
Carlo Bovi was born in Bologna, Italy in 1576 and ordained a deacon in January 1622. On 10 January 1622, he was appointed Bishop of Bagnoregio by Pope Gregory XV. On 30 January 1622, he was consecrated bishop by Ludovico Ludovisi, Archbishop of Bologna, with Galeazzo Sanvitale, Archbishop Emeritus of Bari-Canosa, and Alfonso Gonzaga, Titular Archbishop of Rhodus, serving as co-consecrators.

On 29 January 1635, he was appointed by Pope Urban VIII as Bishop of Sarsina. He served as Bishop of Sarsina until his death on 24 March 1646.

== Episcopal succession ==
While bishop, he was the principal co-consecrator of:

- Fabrizio Carafa (bishop), Bishop of Bitonto (1622);
- Ernst Adalbert of Harrach, Archbishop of Prague (1623);
- Ottaviano Garzadori, Bishop of Boiano (1623);
- Ovidio Lupari, Bishop of Teano (1623);
- Clemente Confetti, Coadjutor Bishop of Muro Lucano (1623);
- Giovanni Francesco Gandolfo, Bishop of Ventimiglia (1623); and
- Pace Giordano, Bishop of Trogir (1623).

== External links and additional sources ==
- Cheney, David M. "Diocese of Bagnoregio (Bagnorea)". Catholic-Hierarchy.org. (for Chronology of Bishops) ^{[self-published]}
- Chow, Gabriel. "Titular Episcopal See of Bagnoregio (Italy)". GCatholic.org. (for Chronology of Bishops) ^{[self-published]}

Catholic Church titles
| Preceded by Lelio Ruini | Bishop of Bagnoregio; 1622–1635 | Succeeded by Pietro Paolo Febei |
| Preceded by Amico Panici | Bishop of Sarsina; 1635–1646 | Succeeded by Caesar Reghini |

ly
