= Reghini =

Reghini is an Italian surname. Notable people with the surname include:

- Arturo Reghini (1878–1946), Italian mathematician, philosopher, and esotericist
- Caesar Reghini (1581–1658), Italian Roman Catholic prelate
