= Caesar Reghini =

17th-century Bishop of Sarsina

Most Reverend Caesar Reghini
- Church: Catholic Church
- Diocese: Diocese of Sarsina
- In office: 1646–1658
- Predecessor: Carlo Bovi
- Successor: Francesco Caetani

Orders
- Consecration: 16 December 1646 by Marcantonio Franciotti

Personal details
- Born: 1581 Pontremoli, Spanish Habsburg's Duchy of Milan
- Died: 1658 (age 77) Sarsina, Papal States

Caesar Reghini (1581–1658) was a Roman Catholic prelate who served as Bishop of Sarsina (1646–1658).

== Biography ==
Caesar Reghini was born in Pontremoli, Spanish Habsburg's Duchy of Milan in 1581. On 3 December 1646, he was appointed Bishop of Sarsina by Pope Innocent X. On 16 December 1646, he was consecrated bishop by Marcantonio Franciotti, Cardinal-Priest of Santa Maria della Pace, with Luca Torreggiani, Archbishop of Ravenna, and Ranuccio Scotti Douglas, Bishop of Borgo San Donnino, serving as co-consecrators.

He served as Bishop of Sarsina until his death in 1658.

== External links and additional sources ==
- Chow, Gabriel. "Diocese of Sarsina". GCatholic.org. (for Chronology of Bishops) ^{[self-published]}

Catholic Church titles
| Preceded by Carlo Bovi | Bishop of Sarsina; 1646–1658 | Succeeded by Francesco Caetani |
