= Veronelli =

Veronelli is an Italian surname. Notable people with the surname include:

- Diego Veronelli (born 1979), Argentine tennis player
- Luigi Veronelli (1926–2004), Italian gastronome, wine critic, and intellectual
