= Aurelio Archinti =

Most Reverend Aurelio Archinto
- Bishop of Como
- Church: Catholic Church
- Diocese: Diocese of Como
- In office: 1621–1622
- Predecessor: Filippo Archinto (bishop)
- Successor: Desiderio Scaglia

Orders
- Consecration: 11 July 1621 by Ludovico Ludovisi

Personal details
- Born: 1588 Italy
- Died: 16 September 1622 (age 34) Como, Italy

Aurelio Archinti or Aurelius Archinto (1588 – 16 September 1622) was a Roman Catholic prelate who served as Bishop of Como (1621–1622).

== Biography ==
Aurelio Archinto was born in 1588 in Italy. On 7 June 1621, he was appointed during the papacy of Pope Gregory XV as Bishop of Como. On 11 July 1621, he was consecrated bishop by Ludovico Ludovisi, Archbishop of Bologna with Galeazzo Sanvitale, Archbishop Emeritus of Bari, and Ulpiano Volpi, Bishop of Novara, serving as co-consecrators. He served as Bishop of Como until his death on 16 September 1622.

== External links and additional sources ==
- Cheney, David M. "Diocese of Como". Catholic-Hierarchy.org. (for Chronology of Bishops) ^{[self-published]}
- Chow, Gabriel. "Diocese of Como (Italy)". GCatholic.org. (for Chronology of Bishops) ^{[self-published]}

Catholic Church titles
| Preceded by Filippo Archinti (bishop) | Bishop of Como; 1621–1622 | Succeeded by Desiderio Scaglia |
