= Fiorano =

Fiorano may refer to:

- Fiorano Canavese, comune in Italy
- Fiorano Modenese, comune in Italy
- Fiorano (wine), Italian wine producing estate in Latium owned by prince Alberico Boncompagni Ludovisi
- Fiorano Circuit, test circuit owned and utilized by Ferrari located on the outskirts of Fiorano Modenese
- The Ferrari 599 GTB Fiorano, 2 seater GT sports car built by Ferrari, named for the circuit
