= Cardinals created by Gregory XV =

Catholic appointments from 1621 to 1622

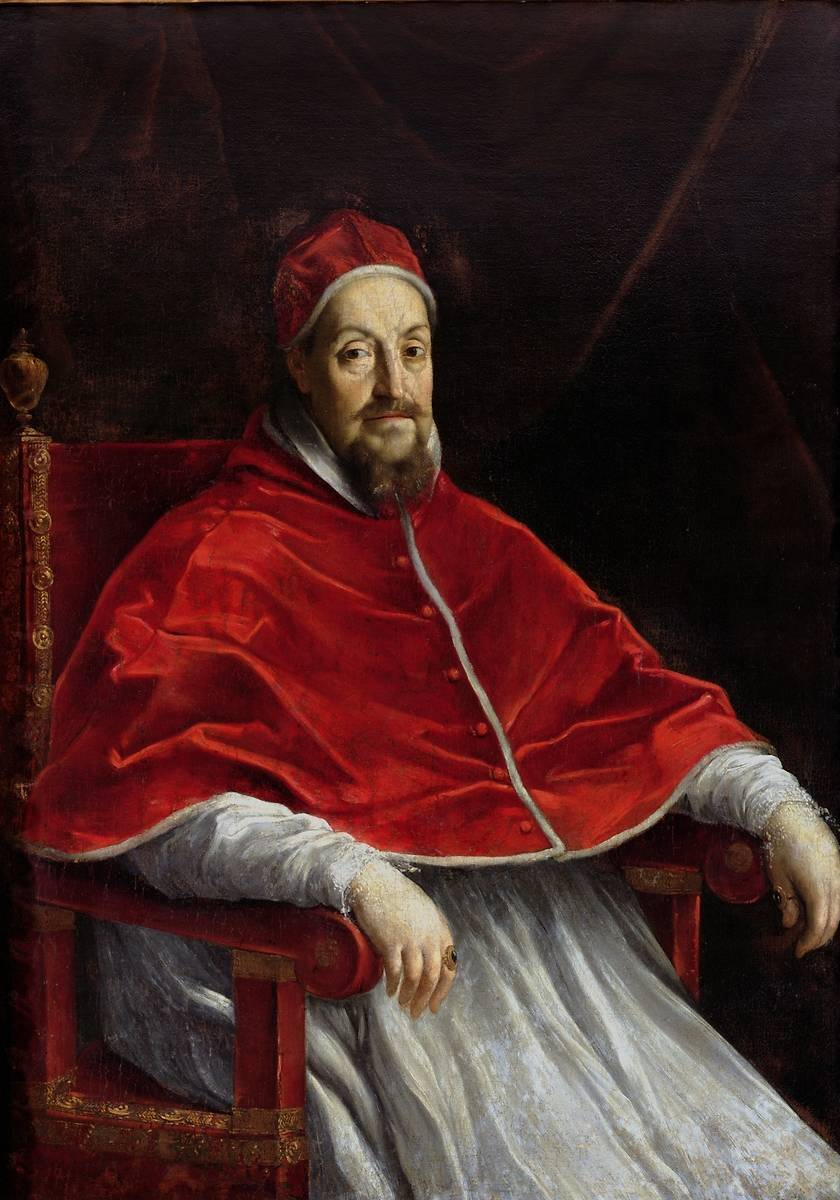
Pope Gregory XV (1554-1623).

Pope Gregory XV (r. 1621–1623) created eleven cardinals in four consistories:

== 15 February 1621 ==
- Ludovico Ludovisi, nephew of the Pope – cardinal-priest of S. Maria in Traspontina (received the title on 17 March 1621), then cardinal-priest of S. Lorenzo in Damaso (7 June 1623), † 18 November 1632

== 19 April 1621 ==
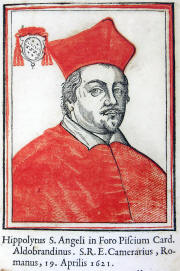
Ippolito Aldobrandini (1592-1638), made a cardinal on April 19, 1621.

All the new cardinals received titular churches on 17 May 1621.

- Antonio Caetani, archbishop of Capua – cardinal-priest of S. Pudenziana, † 17 March 1624
- Francesco Sacrati, titular archbishop of Damasco – cardinal-priest of S. Matteo in Merulana, † 6 September 1623
- Francesco Boncompagni, grandson of Gregory XIII – cardinal-deacon of S. Angelo in Pescheria, then cardinal-deacon of S. Eustachio (16 March 1626), cardinal-priest of SS. IV Coronati (6 February 1634), † 9 December 1641
- Ippolito Aldobrandini, grand-nephew of Clement VIII – cardinal-deacon of S. Maria Nuova, then cardinal-deacon of S. Angelo in Pescheria (16 March 1626), cardinal-deacon of S. Eustachio (6 February 1634), † 19 July 1638

== 21 July 1621 ==
Both cardinals received the titular churches on 30 August 1621.

- Lucio Sanseverino, archbishop of Salerno – cardinal-priest of S. Stefano al Monte Celio, † 25 December 1623
- Marcantonio Gozzadini, cousin of the Pope – cardinal-priest of S. Eusebio, then cardinal-priest of S. Agata in Suburra (23 May 1623), † 1 September 1623

== 5 September 1622 ==
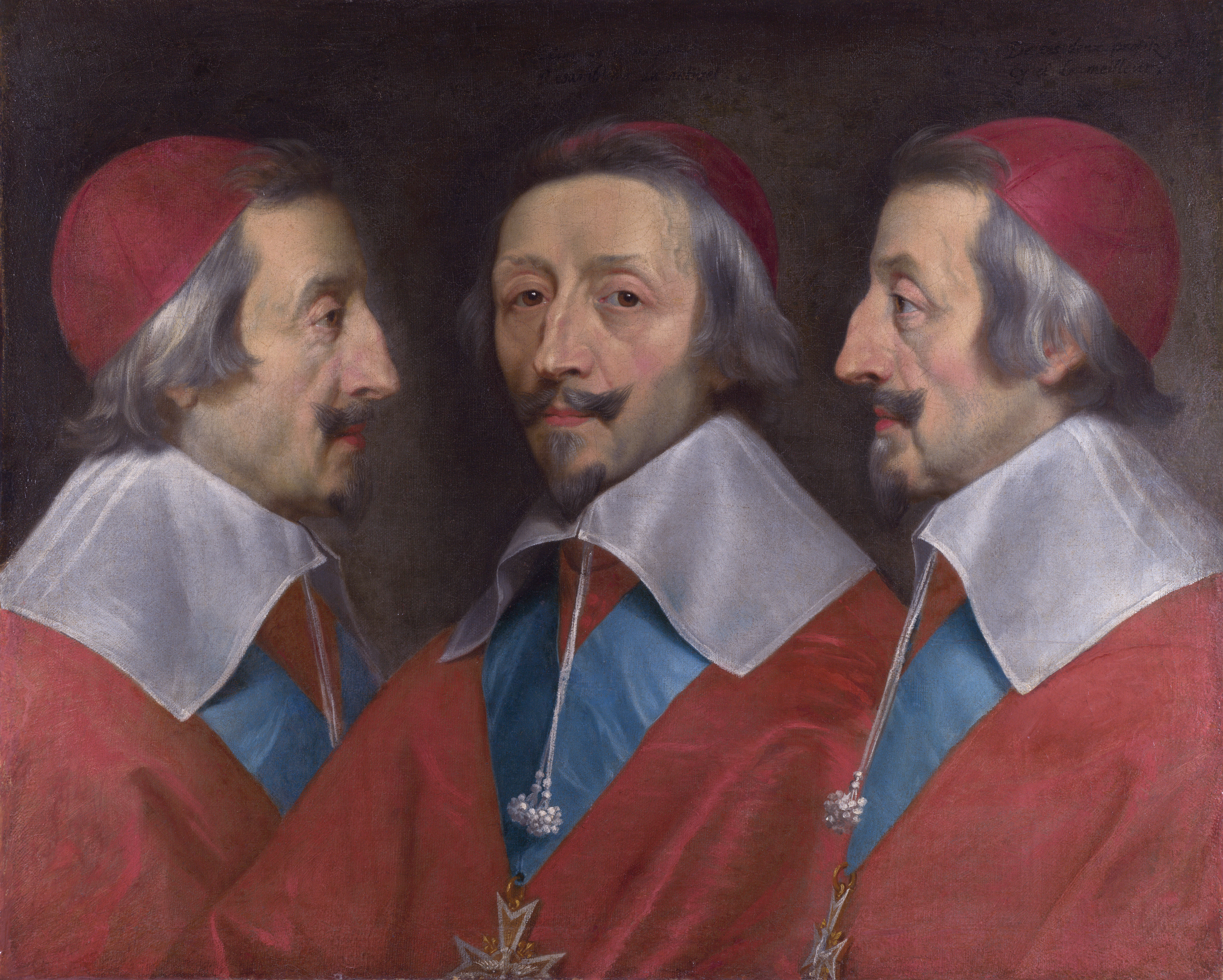
Armand-Jean du Plessis de Richelieu (1585-1642), made a cardinal on September 5, 1622.

- Cosimo de Torres, titular archbishop of Hadrianopolis, apostolic nuncio in Poland – cardinal-priest of S. Pancrazio (received the title on 20 March 1623), then cardinal-priest of S. Maria in Trastevere (1 July 1641), † 1 May 1642
- Armand-Jean du Plessis de Richelieu, bishop Luçon – cardinal-priest (never received the title), † 4 December 1642
- Ottavio Ridolfi, bishop of Ariano – cardinal-priest of S. Agnese in Agone (received the title on 26 October 1622), then cardinal-priest of S. Agata in Suburra (7 October 1623), † 6 July 1624
- Alfonso de la Cueva-Benavides y Mendoza-Carrillo – cardinal-priest of SS. Silvestro e Martino (received the title on 18 July 1633), then cardinal-priest of S. Balbina (9 July 1635), cardinal-bishop of Palestrina (17 October 1644), † 10 August 1655
