= Sarsina Cathedral =

Cathedral in Sarsina, Emilia-Romagna, Italy

Coordinates: 43.9188°N 12.1437°E

Façade.

Sarsina Cathedral (Italian: Duomo di Sarsina; Basilica Concattedrale di Santa Maria Annunziata) is a Roman Catholic cathedral in Sarsina, a municipality in the province of Forlì-Cesena, region of Emilia-Romagna, Italy, dedicated to the Annunciation of the Virgin Mary. Formerly the seat of the Bishops of Sarsina, since 1986 it has been a co-cathedral of the Diocese of Cesena-Sarsina.

== History ==
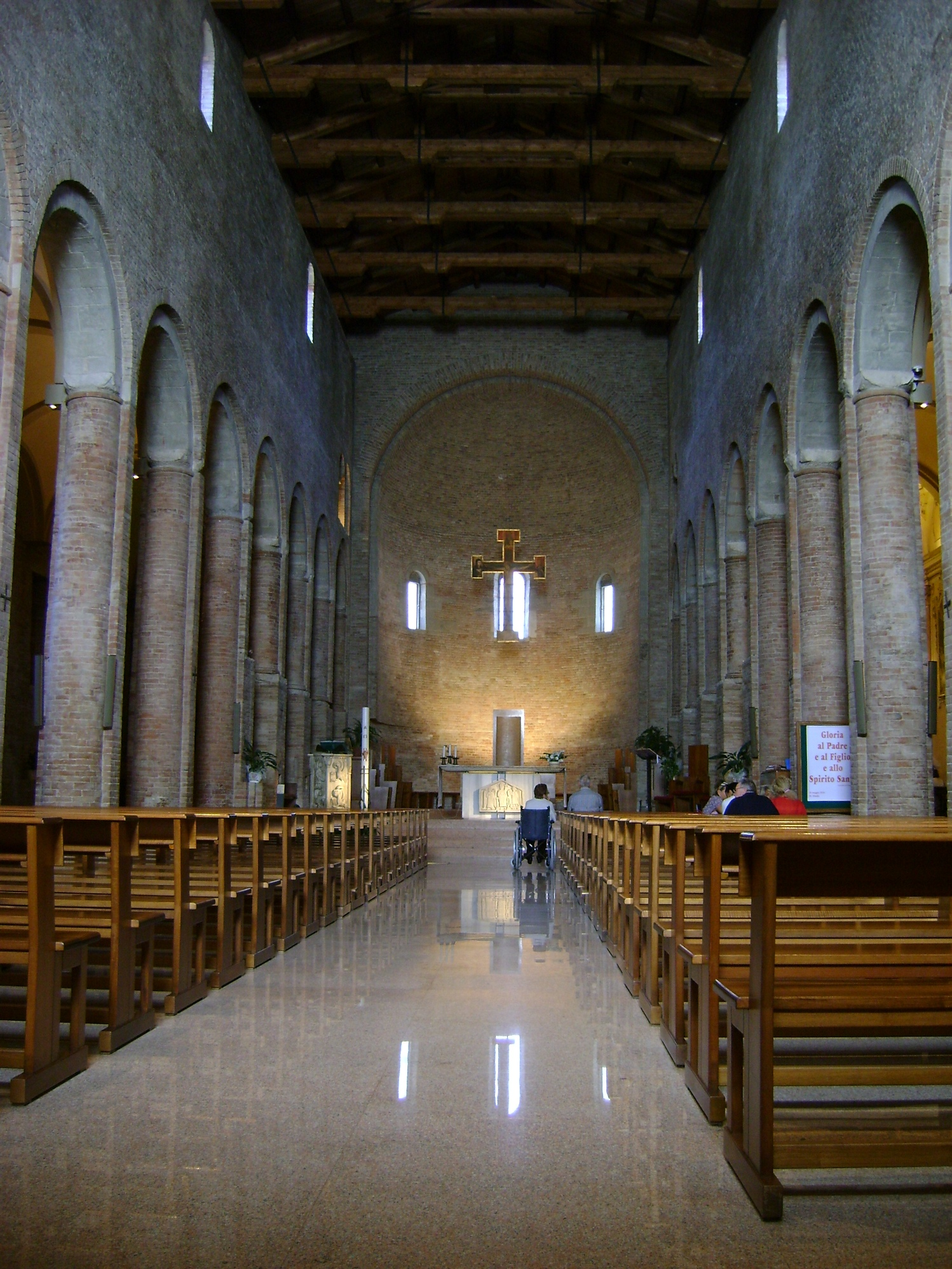
Interior.

Construction of the cathedral was probably begun around the year 1000, when a Romanesque structure in brick was built on top of an earlier building from the Roman or early Christian era. 1008 was chosen as the official year of start of construction, with festivities in 2008. The lunette above the entrance portal has a modern mosaic depicting Saint Vicinius wearing a bishop's mitre and holding a chain. The façade remains unfinished. The interior nave is generally austere.

Chapels added to the lateral aisles, include a chapel (1693) dedicated to the Virgin of the Rosary with a 17th-century altarpiece with 14 small paintings depicting the Mysteries of the Rosary. On the left nave is also the chapel of the Sacrament (1555), with a Renaissance-style altar.

The presbytery held entrance to a crypt. The main altar has a 10th-century bas-relief depicting Christ enthroned with St Gabriel and St Michael. Among the paintings here are a Visitation by Michele Valbonesi; and Annuciation (18th century) by Mattia de Mare; and finally an 18th-century Madonna and Child with Santa Lucia and the Souls of Purgatory by unknown hands. Near the apse is a canvas depicting the Mass of San Gregorio Magno attributed to Carlo Cignani.

Opening to the nave on the right is the chapel of San Vicinio with elaborate stucco decoration patronized by the bishop Paolo Calbetti in 1755. The altar houses the relics of the saint, while the chains are in the tabernacle. The altarpiece is a Madonna and Child with San Vicinio Crowned by Ippolito Scarsella, also called il Scarsellino. (Note: Previously erroneously attributed to Michele Valbonesi.) Michele Valbonesi painted four votive canvases depicting Miracles of San Vicinio along the walls.
