= Roman Catholic Diocese of Sarsina =

The Catholic diocese of Sarsina (Sassina, Saxena, Bobium) was a Roman Catholic ecclesiastical territory in Emilia-Romagna, northern Italy, seated in Sarsina, in the province of Forlì, some 32 km south-southwest of Cesena. The diocese was founded in the 5th century, and was suffragan (subordinate) to the archbishop of Ravenna. The diocese existed until 1986, when it was united with the diocese of Cesena.

== History ==
The patron of the city is Saint Vicinius, believed to have been bishop about the year 300.

In the bull "Dominici Gregis", of 1 September 1824, Pope Leo XII states that the diocese of Sarsina had existed since the 5th century.

In the tenth century the bishops obtained the temporal sovereignty of the city of Sarsina and the surrounding district. They were styled Counts of Bobio. From 1327 till 1400 it was disputed by the Ordelaffi of Forlì, the popes, and the bishops.

The archives of the diocese used to be kept in the castle of Ceola, but they were heavily damaged in the 16th century. Bishop Angelo Peruzzi (1581–1600) had the castle decorated with effigies of his predecessors, to each of which was affixed a short verse, giving no dates and generally vague as to episcopal accomplishments. The verses are nonetheless used as historical source material.

Bishop Giovanni Battista Braschi (1699–1718) reported in his Relatio of 1704 that the cathedral had once had a Chapter with three dignities (the Provost, the Archdeacon, and the Archpriest), but that the Archdeaconry survived. There had once been two Canones supernumerarii, but they too had lapsed. In 1749, there was one dignity, the Archdeacon, and fourteen Canons, though the population of Sarsina was about 600 persons.

In 1807 Napoleon, who was President of the Cisalpine Republic, suppressed the diocese, in accordance with policies originally established by the French Civil Constitution of the Clergy. The arrangement was ratified by Pope Pius VII on 16 September 1803. The diocese was re-established in 1817.

In 1824, the diocese was so poor that it was not able to support the bishop in proper style, and therefore it had to be united to the diocese of Bertinoro, with the bishop of Bertinoro acting as administrator of the diocese of Sarsina, whose episcopal throne was left vacant. The diocese of Sarsina was provided with a bishop by Pope Pius IX in 1872, ending the administratorship.

The diocese was suffragan of the archdiocese of Ravenna.

=== Consolidation of dioceses ===
The Second Vatican Council (1962–1965), in order to ensure that all Catholics received proper spiritual attention, decreed the reorganization of the diocesan structure of Italy and the consolidation of small and struggling dioceses. These considerations applied to Cesena and Sarsina. In 1980, Cesena had estimated Catholic population of 152,000, with 201 priests. Sarsina, in 1980 had 13,200 Catholics, and 34 priests.

On 18 February 1984, the Vatican and the Italian State signed a new and revised concordat. Based on the revisions, a set of Normae was issued on 15 November 1984, which was accompanied in the next year, on 3 June 1985, by enabling legislation. According to the agreement, the practice of having one bishop govern two separate dioceses at the same time, aeque personaliter, was abolished. Bishop Luigi Amaducci had governed both Cesena and Sarsina since 1977.

Instead, the Vatican continued consultations which had begun under Pope John XXIII for the merging of small dioceses, especially those with personnel and financial problems, into one combined diocese. On 30 September 1986, Pope John Paul II ordered that the dioceses of Cesena and Sarsina be merged into one diocese with one bishop, with the Latin title Dioecesis Caesenatensis-Sarsinatensis . The seat of the diocese was to be in Cesena, and the cathedral of Cesena was to serve as the cathedral of the merged dioceses. The cathedral in Sarsina was to become a co-cathedral, and the cathedral Chapter was to be a Capitulum Concathedralis. There was to be one diocesan Tribunal, in Cesena, and likewise one seminary, one College of Consultors, and one Priests' Council. The territory of the new diocese was to include the territory of the former diocese of Sarsina.

== Bishops ==
=== to 1200 ===
...

- Vicinius (4th cent.)

[Rufinus]
...
[Benno]
...

- Lupo (attested 879)

...

- Wido (Guido) (attested 967)
- Joannes (attested 969)

...

- Alboardus (997–1024)

...

- Divizo (1139?–1149?)

...

- Ubertus (attested 1055)

...

- Ubertus (attested 1154)

...

- Albericus (1176– ? )

=== 1200 to 1500 ===
- Joachim ( ? –1209)
- Albericus (attested 1209–1221)
- Albertus
- Rufinus (attested 1230–1257)
- Joannes
- Guido, O.Cist. (attested 1265)
- Gratia (1266–1271)
- Henricus
- Ugucius
- Franciscus Calboli (1327–1361?)
- Joannes de Nomayo (1361–1385)
- Benedictus Matteucci Accorselli, 0.S.B. (1386–1395)
- Jacobus da S. Severino (1395–1398)
- Joannes Philippi Negusanti (1398–1445)
- Daniele di Arluno, C.R.S.A. (1445–1449)
- Mariano Farinata (1449–1451)
- Fortunato Pellicani (1451–1474)
- Antonio Monaldo (1474–1503)

=== 1500 to 1800 ===
- Galeazzo Corvara (1503–1524)

Giovanni Antonio Corvara (1523–1524)

- Raffaele Alessandrini, O.F.M. Obs. (1524–1530)
- Lelio Garuffi Rotelli de Piis (1530–1580)
- Leandro Garuffi Rotelli de Piis (1580–1581)
- Angelo Peruzzi (1581–1600 Died)
- Nicolas Braverio (1602–1632)
- Amico Panici (1632–1634)
- Carlo Bovi (1635–1646)
- Caesar Reghini (1646–1658)
- Francesco Caetani (1658–1659)
- Federico Martinotti (Martinozzi) (1661–1677)
- Francesco Crisolini (1678–1682)
- Bernardin Marchese (1683–1699)
- Giovanni Battista Braschi (1699–1718 Resigned)
- Giovanni Bernardino Vendemini (1733–1749)
- Giovanni Paolo Calbetti (1749–1760)
- Giovanni Battista Mami (1760–1787)
- Nicola Casali (1787–1814)

=== since 1800 ===
- Carlo Monti (1817–1818)
- Pietro Balducci, C.M. (1818–1822)
- Pietro Balducci, C.M. (1818–1822 Appointed, Bishop of Fabriano e Matelica)
- Federico Bencivenni, O.F.M. Cap. (1824–1829 Died)

Sede vacante (1822-1872)

Federico Bencivenni, O.F.M. Cap. (1824–1829) Administrator
Giambattista Guerra (15 Mar 1830 - 4 Jul 1857) Administrator
Pietro Buffetti (3 Aug 1857- 23 Feb 1872) Administrator

- Tobia Masacci (1872–1880)
- Pietro Balducci, C.M. (1818–1822 Appointed, Bishop of Fabriano e Matelica)
- Federico Bencivenni, O.F.M. Cap. (1824–1829 Died)
- Tobia Masacci (1872–1880)
- Dario Mattei-Gentili (1880–1891 Appointed, Bishop of Città di Castello)
- Henricus Gratiani (1892–1897)
- Domenico Riccardi (1898–1910)

Luigi Ermini (1910– Did Not Take Effect)

- Eugenio Giambro (1911–1916 Appointed, Bishop of Nicastro)
- Ambrogio Riccardi (1916–1922 Died)
- Antonio Scarante (1922–1930 Appointed, Bishop of Faenza)
- Teodoro Pallaroni (1931–1944 Died)
- Carlo Stoppa (1945–1948 Appointed, Bishop of Alba)
- Emilio Biancheri (1949–1953 Appointed, Bishop of Rimini)
- Carlo Bandini (1953–1976 Retired)
- Augusto Gianfranceschi (1976–1977 Retired)
- Luigi Amaducci (1977–1986 Appointed, Bishop of Cesena-Sarsina)

== Books ==
=== Episcopal lists ===
- Gams, Pius Bonifatius (1873). Series episcoporum Ecclesiae catholicae: quotquot innotuerunt a beato Petro apostolo. Ratisbon: Typis et Sumptibus Georgii Josephi Manz. pp. 724–725. (in Latin)
- Eubel, Conradus, ed. (1913). Hierarchia catholica. Vol. Tomus 1 (second ed.). Münster: Libreria Regensbergiana. (in Latin)
- Eubel, Conradus, ed. (1914). Hierarchia catholica. Vol. Tomus 2 (second ed.). Münster: Libreria Regensbergiana. (in Latin)
- Gulik, Guilelmus (1923). Eubel, Conradus (ed.). Hierarchia catholica. Vol. Tomus 3 (second ed.). Münster: Libreria Regensbergiana. (in Latin)
- Gauchat, Patritius (Patrice) (1935). Hierarchia catholica. Vol. Tomus IV (1592-1667). Münster: Libraria Regensbergiana. (in Latin)
- Ritzler, Remigius; Sefrin, Pirminus (1952). Hierarchia catholica medii et recentis aevi V (1667-1730). Patavii: Messagero di S. Antonio.
- Ritzler, Remigius; Sefrin, Pirminus (1958). Hierarchia catholica medii et recentis aevi. Vol. Tomus VI (1730-1799). Patavii: Messagero di S. Antonio. (in Latin)
- Ritzler, Remigius; Sefrin, Pirminus (1968). Hierarchia Catholica medii et recentioris aevi sive summorum pontificum, S. R. E. cardinalium, ecclesiarum antistitum series... A pontificatu Pii PP. VII (1800) usque ad pontificatum Gregorii PP. XVI (1846) (in Latin). Vol. VII. Monasterii: Libr. Regensburgiana.
- Remigius Ritzler; Pirminus Sefrin (1978). Hierarchia catholica Medii et recentioris aevi... A Pontificatu PII PP. IX (1846) usque ad Pontificatum Leonis PP. XIII (1903) (in Latin). Vol. VIII. Il Messaggero di S. Antonio.
- Pięta, Zenon (2002). Hierarchia catholica medii et recentioris aevi... A pontificatu Pii PP. X (1903) usque ad pontificatum Benedictii PP. XV (1922) (in Latin). Vol. IX. Padua: Messagero di San Antonio. ISBN 978-88-250-1000-8.

=== Studies ===
- Antonini, Filippo (1769). Delle antichità di Sarsina (in Italian). Faenza: G. Archi.
- Braschi, Giovanni Battista (1704). Relatio status ecclesiae Sarsinatensis, ac exerciti pastoralis officii a r.p.d. Joanne Baptista Braschio episcopo apostolorum Petri & Pauli sacra limina visitante anno 1703. . (in Latin). Roma: typis Lucae Antonii Chracas.
- Cappelletti, Giuseppei (1844). Le chiese d'Italia (in Italian). Vol. secondo. Venezia: Antonelli. pp. 481–523.
- Kehr, Paul Fridolin (1906). Italia Pontificia Vol. V: Aemilia, sive Provincia Ravennas. Berlin: Weidmann. (in Latin).
- Lanzoni, Francesco (1927). Le diocesi d'Italia dalle origini al principio del secolo VII (an. 604). Faenza: F. Lega, pp. 503–504; 723; 763. (in Italian)
- Schwartz, Gerhard (1907). Die Besetzung der Bistümer Reichsitaliens unter den sächsischen und salischen Kaisern: mit den Listen der Bischöfe, 951-1122. Leipzig: B.G. Teubner. pp. 179–181. (in German)
- Ughelli, Ferdinando; Coleti, Niccolò (1717). Italia sacra sive De Episcopis Italiae, et insularum adjacentium (in Italian). Vol. Tomus secundus (2). Venice: apud Sebastianum Coleti. pp. 651–676. [very unreliable for Sarsina]
