= Fiorano (wine) =

Italian wine producing estate

Coordinates: 41.7945562°N 12.5756459°E

Fiorano was an Italian wine-producing estate owned by Alberico Boncompagni Ludovisi, a prince of Venosa of the Ludovisi family, active during a period from the late 1940s to 1995. Fiorano is situated in the vicinity of Rome near the Via Appia Antica in the Latium district. Famed wine writer Burton Anderson dubbed Fiorano's wines 'the noblest Romans of them all' in his 1980 anthology Vino. The estate, its methods, wines and its proprietor were all noted for their unorthodoxy in comparison to norms of the wine industry. Though limited in terms of fame, the red wine and two white wines produced at Fiorano during its period of activity achieved reputations for innovation and longevity. Since the late 1960s a small number of devout 'cognoscenti', especially among restaurant owners in Rome, knew about the extraordinary qualities of the two whites Fiorano Bianco (100% Malvasia) and Fiorano Riserva Semillon, and overcame numerous obstacles in order to get the wines.

== History ==
While the Boncompagni Ludovisi family lineage may be traced back ca. 1,000 years, the Fiorano estate, located 14 km (8.7 mi) from Rome, had viticulture from local grape varieties first starting in the 1930s. Prince Alberico Boncompagni Ludovisi inherited the estate in 1946, and replaced the existing vines with the Bordeaux international grape varieties of Cabernet Sauvignon, Merlot and Sémillon as well as Malvasia di Candia. This change of viticultural direction took place several years ahead of what later became a trend. Prince Boncompagni Ludovisi also practiced organic agriculture during an era when chemical agriculture methods were more commonplace. This happened after consultation with Dr. Giuseppe Palieri who remained an advisor until his death. Later, Boncompagni Ludovisi received advice from Dr. Tancredi Biondi Santi, of whom he was a fan since tasting a bottle of Brunello di Montalcino Biondi Santi 1946 which he described in letter to him as "a majestic red, severe, masculine, medieval".

The wines were almost unknown until Italy's famous wine and food critic Luigi Veronelli discovered them by chance in the early 1960s. Veronelli recounted his first meeting with the Prince: 'I was in Latium writing on the region's wines, and while driving on the ancient Appian Way I spotted the most beautiful vineyards. I followed the road until I came to an imposing estate where I stopped and rang the bell. When nobody responded I tried the gate and found it open. Audaciously I went in and was walking around when I suddenly heard the sound of horse hooves racing up behind me. I turned and found myself looking down the barrel of a gun.' After Veronelli explained who he was and his interest in the vineyards, the Prince invited Veronelli to try his wines. 'As soon as I tried his wines, I knew he truly was a prince' said Veronelli, who convinced him to sell some of the wines, up to then only for personal consumption.

Luigi Veronelli stated that Prince Boncompagni Ludovisi was the first to employ "biological farming" practices in Italy. He compared Fiorano red wines to Sassicaia, and once wrote of them, "They enchant you with the first taste, burrow in your memory and make you forever better", and, "If I lived in Rome, I would beg for them at the prince's door every morning". It was the whites though that most impressed him. The Fiorano Bianco from Malvasia di Candia soared to new heights of complexity while the Semillon, a variety that has never had much success in Italy, astounded Veronelli.

The relationship between Boncompagni Ludovisi and his wine merchants has been described as strained due to the Prince's eccentric manner of doing business. Over time, import of the wines ceased, and although wine was made until 1995, the sale of bottles had ended some time before. Elio Mariani, owner of the Checchino restaurant in Rome, confirms that the Prince was unusually stubborn. According to Mariani: 'The Prince never really wanted to sell the wines. He made it very difficult; one had to call up to order the wines and come in person to collect them on the assigned day at a specified time and bring the exact amount in cash. They would not give change, and cheques were out of the question.'

In 1966 Prince Boncompagni Ludovisi's sole daughter Francesca married Piero Antinori, a winemaker with a reputation associated with the modernist wine movement. When Boncompagni Ludovisi pulled out nearly all Fiorano vines following the 1995 harvest while giving no explanation, subsequent rumours claimed this was in order to prevent his son-in-law from ruining the Fiorano legacy. Antinori told Eric Asimov that he believed Boncompagni Ludovisi could not bear the thought of anybody else making his wines after he could no longer do it himself. In a 2001 interview, Boncompagni Ludovisi stated that his reasons were the vines' advanced age and poor health.

Due to his poor health Prince Alberico Boncompagni Ludovisi went to live in Rome. His cousin Prince Paolo Boncompagni Ludovisi and his son Alessandrojacopo came to help him run the estate. Recognizing Alessandrojacopo’s passion for the job, Prince Alberico gave him the replanting rights and a small portion of the estate and, considering him as his successor, suggested he replant the vineyard (The Prince said he would destroy all his vines rather than see Piero get hold of them. I do not think he likes the modern methods that Piero uses to make Antinori wine. When the Prince was asked if he would save the vines for his grandchildren, he said that they learned about wine from their father, Piero, and not from him.). Under Prince Alberico’s precise instructions, Alessandrojacopo restored the vineyard by planting Cabernet Sauvignon and Merlot to resume production of Fiorano Rosso wine. As for the white grapes, Prince Alberico insisted that the old varieties be abandoned in favor of Grechetto and Viognier to make Fiorano Bianco wine. Alessandrojacopo did everything Prince Alberico told him to do, from the choice of soils, to the clones and the system of vine-training, all done by organic method, right through to the making of the wine which is still done with the same craftsmanship as under Prince Alberico. In other words, Alberico gave all his past experience.

Alessandrojacopo inherited Tenuta di Fiorano estate after Prince Alberico died in 2005, enhanced its vineyards and put Fiorano Rosso back on the market starting with vintage 2006.

Today Tenuta di Fiorano is run by Prince Alessandrojacopo Boncompagni Ludovisi and extends for a total of some 200 hectares including vineyards, olive groves, and crop and pasture land.

== Production ==
From a vineyard area of 10 hectares (25 acres), three wines were produced at the estate: one Rosso, a red Bordeaux-style blend from plantings of Cabernet Sauvignon and Merlot; and two white varietal wines, a Sémillon and a Malvasia di Candia.

The grapes are pruned to extremely reduced yields described as "ridiculously low", which resulted in marked levels of flavor concentration.

The wine is aged in large numbered barrels that are reused every year. The Fiorano cellars have a widespread culture of white mold that covered the barrels and bottles, which Boncompagni Ludovisi believed to be beneficial to his production and left to develop undisturbed.
