= Carlo Azzolini =

17th-century Roman Catholic bishop

Most Reverend Carlo Azzolini
- Bishop of Bagnoregio
- Church: Catholic Church
- Diocese: Diocese of Bagnoregio
- In office: 1650–1671
- Predecessor: Pietro Paolo Febei
- Successor: Vincenzo Candiotti

Orders
- Consecration: 2 Jan 1650 by Marcantonio Franciotti

Personal details
- Died: 18 April 1671

Carlo Azzolini (died 1671) was a Roman Catholic prelate who served as Bishop of Bagnoregio (1650–1671).

== Biography ==
On 9 Dec 1649, he was appointed during the papacy of Pope Innocent X as Bishop of Bagnoregio. On 2 Jan 1650, he was consecrated bishop by Marcantonio Franciotti, Cardinal-Priest of Santa Maria della Pace, with Giovanni Battista Rinuccini, Archbishop of Fermo, and Giambattista Spínola (seniore), Archbishop of Acerenza e Matera, serving as co-consecrators. He served as Bishop of Bagnoregio until his death on 18 Apr 1671.

== Episcopal succession ==
While bishop, he was the principal co-consecrator:

- Calanio della Ciaja, Bishop of Nardò (1652);
- Lodovico Betti, Bishop of Osimo (1652); and
- Carlo Gualterio, Archbishop of Fermo (1654).

== External links and additional sources ==
- Cheney, David M. "Diocese of Bagnoregio (Bagnorea)". Catholic-Hierarchy.org. (for Chronology of Bishops) ^{[self-published]}
- Chow, Gabriel. "Titular Episcopal See of Bagnoregio (Italy)". GCatholic.org. (for Chronology of Bishops) ^{[self-published]}

Catholic Church titles
Preceded by Pietro Paolo Febei	Bishop of Bagnoregio; 1650–1671	Succeeded by Vincenzo Candiotti
