= Vicinius of Sarsina =

Saint Vicinius or Saint Vicinius of Sarsina (Italian: San Vicinio di Sarsina; died 330) was the first bishop of Sarsina and is venerated as a Roman Catholic saint.

== Hagiography ==
Vicinius's life is based on notes in an anonymous manuscript lectionary of the 12th century.

Vicinius, traditionally the first bishop of Sarsina, is supposed to have been a native of Liguria. Shortly before the great persecutions of Diocletian and Maximinus II, he withdrew as a hermit to a mountain about six kilometres from Sarsina which is now named after him (Monte San Vicinio, in the present commune of Mercato Saraceno). Here he followed a life of prayer and penitence. While the priests and people of Sarsina were assembled to choose a bishop, a divine sign appeared over the mountain top. In this way, the solitary Vicinius was appointed bishop, from the beginning of the fourth century (about 303) to his death in 330.

Even after his election, Vicinius periodically withdrew to the mountains in solitary retreat.

== The Collar of Saint Vicinius ==
During his life, he had a reputation as a miracle-worker, with a particular ability to expel demons and to heal the faithful of physical and mental illness by means of an iron chain or collar weighted with a stone which he wore round his neck as a penance, in the form of two arms joined by a double clasp and terminating in two interlocking rings. According to a scientific study carried out by the University of Bologna, the collar, of uncertain origin, is either contemporary with or slightly earlier than the life of the saint. Today the collar is used for blessings. It is said to be the hand of the saint who by his powerful intercession with God gives grace to all those who make pilgrimage to his altar. The exorcisms are carried out inside the basilica of San Vicinio (the former Sarsina Cathedral) by priests specially authorised by the bishop.

== Cult ==
In Sarsina Cathedral is the Chapel of Saint Vicinius. Here are kept the saint's relics and the miraculous collar, the reputation of which still brings pilgrims seeking the saint's aid in healing illness and possession.

The feast of Saint Vicinius is celebrated on 28 August.

== Sources ==
- Vita s. Vicinii episcopi Sassinatis, (Lectionarium, Biblioteca Gambalunga di Rimini, ms. 4.A.1.1.)
- La prima vita di san Vicinio vescovo di Sarsina, introduzione e testo a cura di G. Lucchesi; traduzione di A. Zini e W. Ferretti, Faenza 1973
- Vita di Vicinio, a cura di Marino Mengozzi, (Vite dei santi dell'Emilia Romagna; 2), Cesena 2003,
