= Giovan Battista Ludovisi =

Giovanni/Giovan Battista Ludovisi (John Baptist Ludovisi) (1647 - 24 August 1699), 3rd Duke of Fiano and Zagarolo, was the Prince of Piombino, Marquis of Populonia, Prince of Venosa and Count of Conza, Lord di Scarlino, Populonia, Vignale, Abbadia del Fango, Suvereto, Buriano, Cerboli e Palmaiolan, and Lord prince of the Tuscan Archipelago including the islands of Elba, Montecristo, Pianosa, Gorgona, Capraia, and Isola del Giglio, serving from 25 December 1664 until his death in 1699.

Arms of Ludovisi family

== Life ==
Giovan Battista Ludovisi was the son and heir of Niccolò I Ludovisi and his third wife Costanza Pamphili, sister of Vatican cardinal Camillo Pamphili. He had four sisters, Lavinia (wife of Girolamo Acquaviva, Duke of Atri), Olimpia, Ippolita and Nicolina. Giovan inherited his parents' domains the Ludovisi de Candia and the Pamphili, including the Principality of Piombino on 1 September 1665. In 1690 he sold the Duchy of Fiano to the Ottoboni family of Venice.

Giovan married in 1669 to Mary of the House of Montcada, daughter of William Ramon de Moncada, Marquis of Aytona. Mary died in Rome in 1694 without leaving children.

In 1697, Giovan married a second time to Anna Maria Arduino, Furnari dei Notarbartolo. From his marriage to Arduino, they produced one son, Niccolò II Maria Domenico Ludovisi born c.1698, and who died in 1699 at the age of one.

After his death, the principality succession fell to his young son under the regency of his widow, and a few months later after his son died, it was passed on to his sister Olimpia as Princess of Piombino.

Preceded by Niccolò Ludovisi	Prince of Piombino; 1664–1699	Succeeded by Niccolò II Ludovisi
