= Lorenzo Gavotti =

Italian Roman Catholic prelate (1595–1679)

Most Reverend Lorenzo Gavotti
- Titular Archbishop of Rhodus; Bishop Emeritus of Ventimiglia
- Church: Catholic Church
- Diocese: Diocese of Ventimiglia
- In office: 1633–1653
- Predecessor: Giovanni Francesco Gandolfo
- Successor: Mauro Promontorio
- Previous posts: Apostolic Nuncio to Switzerland (1643–1646); Bishop of Ventimiglia (1633–1653)

Orders
- Consecration: 10 Jul 1633 by Giovanni Battista Scanaroli

Personal details
- Born: 1595 Savona, Italy
- Died: 9 Aug 1679 (age 84)

Lorenzo Gavotti, C.R. (1595–1679) was a Roman Catholic prelate who served as Titular Archbishop of Rhodus (1670–1679), Apostolic Nuncio to Switzerland (1643–1646), and Bishop of Ventimiglia (1633–1653).

== Biography ==
Lorenzo Gavotti was born in 1595 in Savona, Italy and ordained a priest in the Congregation of Clerics Regular of the Divine Providence. On 20 Jun 1633, he was appointed during the papacy of Pope Urban VIII as Bishop of Ventimiglia; he served in the position until his resignation on 27 Jan 1653. On 10 Jul 1633, he was consecrated bishop by Giovanni Battista Scanaroli, Titular Bishop of Sidon, with Angelo Cesi, Bishop of Rimini, and Giovanni della Robbia (bishop), Bishop of Bertinoro, serving as co-consecrators. On 28 Oct 1643, he was appointed during the papacy of Pope Urban VIII as Apostolic Nuncio to Switzerland; he resigned from the position on 7 Nov 1646. On 2 Jul 1670, he was appointed during the papacy of Pope Clement X as Titular Archbishop of Rhodus. He died on 9 Aug 1679.

== External links and additional sources ==
- Cheney, David M. "Diocese of Ventimiglia-San Remo". Catholic-Hierarchy.org. (for Chronology of Bishops) ^{[self-published]}
- Chow, Gabriel. "Diocese of Ventimiglia-San Remo (Italy)". GCatholic.org. (for Chronology of Bishops) ^{[self-published]}
- Cheney, David M. "Nunciature to Switzerland". Catholic-Hierarchy.org. (for Chronology of Bishops) ^{[self-published]}
- Chow, Gabriel. "Apostolic Nunciature Switzerland". GCatholic.org. (for Chronology of Bishops) ^{[self-published]}
- Cheney, David M. "Rhodus (Titular See)". Catholic-Hierarchy.org. (for Chronology of Bishops) ^{[self-published]}
- Chow, Gabriel. "Archdiocese of Rhodes". GCatholic.org. (for Chronology of Bishops) ^{[self-published]}

Catholic Church titles
Preceded by Giovanni Francesco Gandolfo	Bishop of Ventimiglia; 1633–1653	Succeeded by Mauro Promontorio
Preceded by Girolamo Farnese	Apostolic Nuncio to Switzerland; 1643–1646	Succeeded by Alfonso Sacrati
Preceded by Francesco Gaetano	Titular Archbishop of Rhodus; 1670–1679	Succeeded by Francesco Niccolini
