= Giovanni Battista del Tinto =

17th-century Italian Catholic bishop

Most Reverend Giovanni Battista del Tinto
- Archbishop (Personal Title) of Cassano all'Jonio
- Church: Catholic Church
- Diocese: Diocese of Cassano all'Jonio
- In office: 1676–1685
- Predecessor: Alfonso de Balmaseda
- Successor: Francisco de Sequeiros y Sotomayor
- Previous post: Archbishop of Trani (1666–1676)

Orders
- Consecration: 22 February 1666

Personal details
- Born: 13 June 1622 Alvito, Lazio, Italy
- Died: 19 May 1685 (age 62) Cassano all'Jonio, Italy

Giovanni Battista del Tinto, O. Carm. (13 June 1622 – 19 May 1685) was a Roman Catholic prelate who served as Archbishop (Personal Title) of Cassano all'Jonio (1676–1685) and Archbishop of Trani (1666–1676).

== Biography ==
Giovanni Battista del Tinto was born in Alvito, Lazio, Italy on 13 June 1622 and ordained a priest in the Order of Our Lady of Mount Carmel. On 15 February 1666, he was appointed during the papacy of Pope Alexander VII as Archbishop of Trani. On 22 February 1666, he was consecrated bishop by Federico Sforza, Cardinal-Priest of San Pietro in Vincoli, with Francesco Caetani, Titular Archbishop of Rhodus, and Joseph-Marie de Suarès, Bishop of Vaison, serving as co-consecrators. On 19 October 1676, he was appointed during the papacy of Pope Innocent XI as Archbishop (Personal Title) of Cassano all'Jonio. He served as Bishop of Cassano all'Jonio until his death on 19 May 1685.

== External links and additional sources ==
- Cheney, David M. "Archdiocese of Trani-Barletta-Bisceglie (-Nazareth)". Catholic-Hierarchy.org. (for Chronology of Bishops) ^{[self-published]}
- Chow, Gabriel. "Archdiocese of Trani-Barletta-Bisceglie (Italy)". GCatholic.org. (for Chronology of Bishops) ^{[self-published]}
- Cheney, David M. "Diocese of Cassano all'Jonio". Catholic-Hierarchy.org. (for Chronology of Bishops) ^{[self-published]}
- Chow, Gabriel. "Diocese of Cassano all'Jonio (Italy)". GCatholic.org. (for Chronology of Bishops) ^{[self-published]}

Catholic Church titles
Preceded by Tommaso de Sarria	Archbishop of Trani; 1666–1676	Succeeded by Pablo Jiménez Alejandro
Preceded by Alfonso de Balmaseda	Archbishop (Personal Title) of Cassano all'Jonio; 1676–1685	Succeeded by Francisco de Sequeiros y Sotomayor
