= Ludovisi Dionysus =

Ancient Roman marble statue

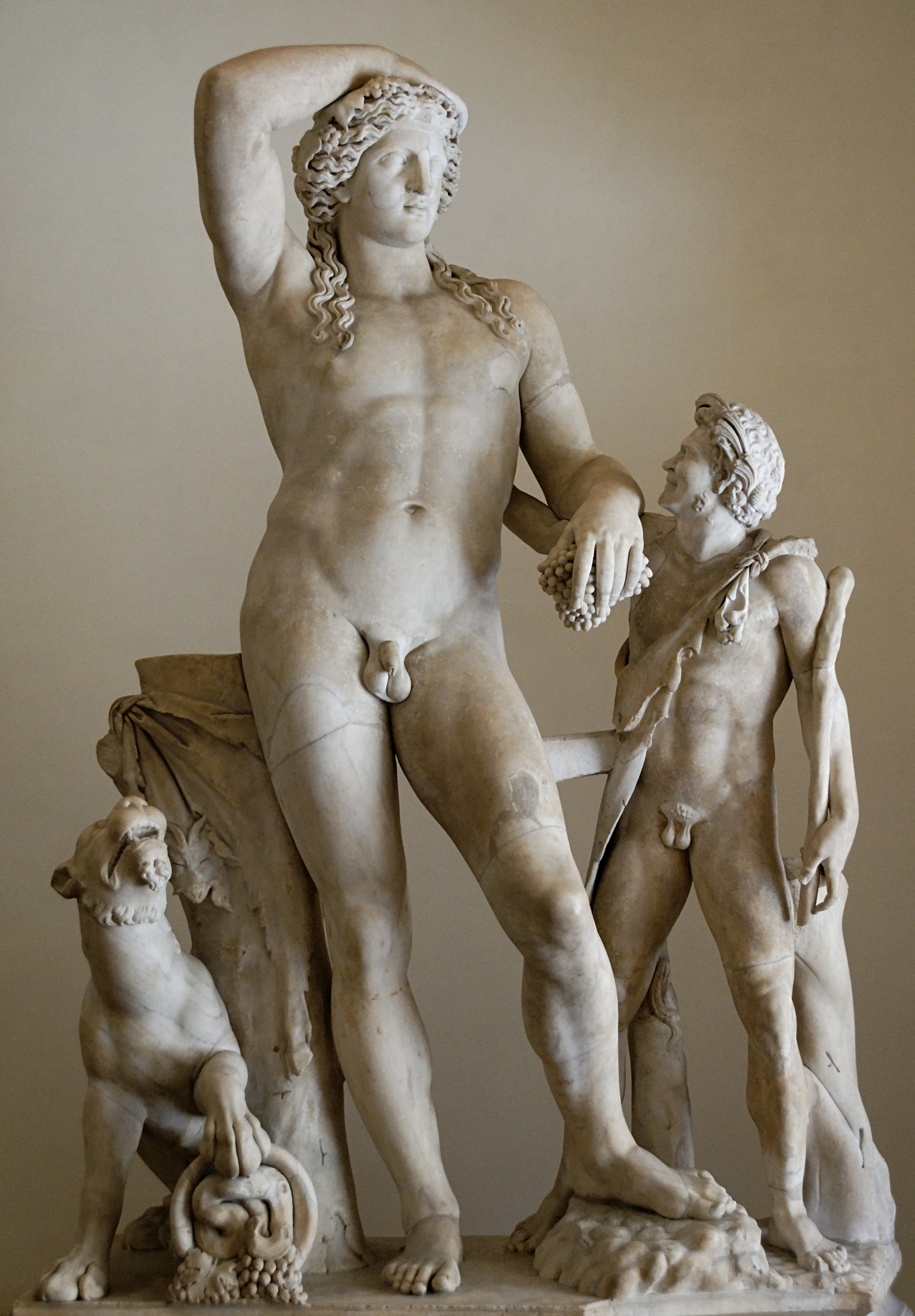
The Dionysus of the Palazzo Altemps, Rome

The over-lifesize marble Dionysus with Panther and Satyr in the Palazzo Altemps, Rome, is a Roman work of the 2nd century AD, found in the 16th century on the Quirinal Hill at the time foundations were being dug for Palazzo Mattei-Albani-Del Drago at Quattro Fontane. The statue was purchased for the Ludovisi collection, where it was first displayed in front of the Palazzo Grande, the main structure of the Villa Ludovisi, and by 1641 in the gallery of sculptures in the Casino Capponi erected for Cardinal Ludovico Ludovisi in the villa's extensive grounds. By 1885, it had been removed to the new Palazzo del Principe di Piombino, nearby in via Veneto. With the rest of the Boncompagni-Ludovisi collection, which was open to the public on Sundays and covered in the guidebooks, and where it had become famous, it was purchased in 1901 for the City of Rome, as the Ludovisi collection was dispersed and the Villa's ground built over at the end of the 19th century.

The formula, with somewhat exaggerated contrapposto, the god's right hand resting on his head, is based on the Apollo Lyceus, which is variously attributed and dated. This ivy-crowned Dionysus is accompanied by the panther that signalises his numinous presence, and a satyr of reduced size, a member of his retinue. Long locks of his hair fall girlishly over his shoulders and in his left hand he holds a bunch of grapes, emblematic of his status as god of wine.

The original elements are the heads, torsos and thighs of Dionysus and the satyr. The arms of the satyr and the lower legs and base are modern— that is, 16th-century— restorations.
