= Pietro Paolo Febei =

Most Reverend Pietro Paolo Febei
- Bishop of Bagnoregio
- Church: Catholic Church
- Diocese: Diocese of Bagnoregio
- In office: 1635–1649
- Predecessor: Carlo Bovi
- Successor: Carlo Azzolini

Orders
- Consecration: 15 July 1635 by Giulio Cesare Sacchetti

Personal details
- Died: 4 August 1649 Bagnoregio, Italy

Pietro Paolo Febei (died 4 August 1649) was a Roman Catholic prelate who served as Bishop of Bagnoregio (1635–1649).

== Biography ==
On 9 July 1635, Pietro Paolo Febei was appointed during the papacy of Pope Urban VIII as Bishop of Bagnoregio. On 15 July 1635, he was consecrated bishop by Giulio Cesare Sacchetti, Bishop of Fano. He served as Bishop of Bagnoregio until his death on 4 August 1649.

== External links and additional sources ==
- Cheney, David M. "Diocese of Bagnoregio (Bagnorea)". Catholic-Hierarchy.org. (for Chronology of Bishops) ^{[self-published]}
- Chow, Gabriel. "Titular Episcopal See of Bagnoregio (Italy)". GCatholic.org. (for Chronology of Bishops) ^{[self-published]}

Catholic Church titles
| Preceded by Carlo Bovi | Bishop of Bagnoregio; 1635–1649 | Succeeded by Carlo Azzolini |
