= Giovanni Battista Braschi =

Italian bishop (1657–1736)

Most Reverend Giovanni Battista Braschi
- Titular Archbishop of Nisibis; Bishop Emeritus of Sarsina
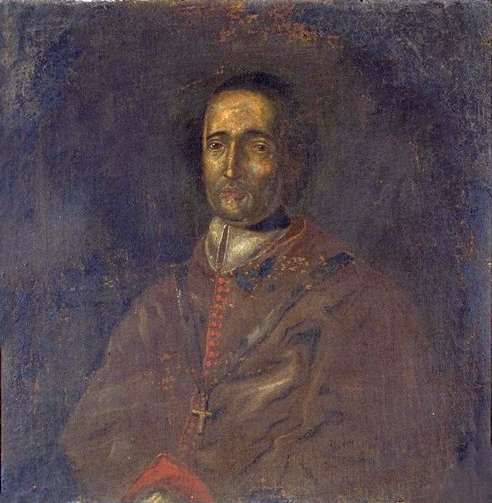
- Church: Catholic Church
- In office: 1724–1736
- Successor: José de Bolaños Calzado
- Previous post: Bishop of Sarsina (1699–1724)

Orders
- Consecration: 22 June 1699 by Pier Matteo Petrucci

Personal details
- Born: 1657 Cesene, Papal States
- Died: 24 November 1736 (age 79) Rome, Papal States

Giovanni Battista Braschi or Giambattista Braschi (1657–1736) was a Roman Catholic prelate who served as Titular Archbishop of Nisibis (1724–1736) and Bishop of Sarsina (1699–1724).

== Biography ==
Giovanni Battista Braschi was born in Cesene, Italy in 1657. On 1 June 1699, he was appointed during the papacy of Pope Innocent XII as Bishop of Sarsina. On 22 June 1699, he was consecrated bishop by Pier Matteo Petrucci, Cardinal-Priest of San Marcello, with Domenico Belisario de Bellis, Bishop of Molfetta, and Stefano Cupilli, Bishop of Trogir, serving as co-consecrators. On 14 May 1718, he resigned as Bishop of Sarsina. On 20 December 1724, he was appointed during the papacy of Pope Benedict XIII as Titular Archbishop of Nisibis. He served as Titular Archbishop of Nisibis until his death on 24 November 1736 .

== Episcopal succession ==
Episcopal succession of Giovanni Battista Braschi

While bishop, he was the principal co-consecrator of:

- Michele Guardia, Bishop of Crotone (1715);
- Antonio Paternò, Archbishop of Lanciano (1719);
- Nicolas Pisanelli, Archbishop of Santa Severina (1719);
- Giuseppe Riganti, Bishop of Teramo (1719);
- Domenico de Marzano, Bishop of Strongoli (1719);
- Eusebio Ciani, Bishop of Massa Marittima (1719);
- Antoine Kacich, Bishop of Trogir (1721);
- Charles Antoine Donadoni, Bishop of Šibenik (1723); and
- Antonio Saverio Gentili, Titular Archbishop of Petra in Palaestina (1727).

Catholic Church titles
Preceded by Bernardin Marchese	Bishop of Sarsina; 1699–1724	Succeeded by Giovanni Bernardino Vendemini
Preceded by	Titular Archbishop of Nisibis; 1724–1736	Succeeded by José de Bolaños Calzado
