= Anna Maria Arduino =

Italian artist, writer (1672–1700)

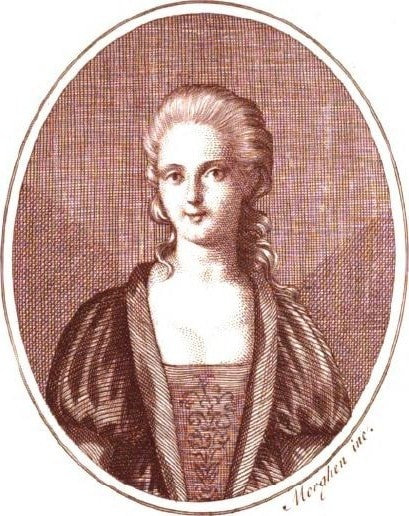
- Anna Maria Arduino (1819)
- Born: 1672; Messina, Italy
- Died: 29 December 1700 (aged 27–28); Naples, Italy
- Other names: Getilde Faresia, Maria Ardoini Lodovisia
- Education: Pontifical Academy of Arcadia
- Title: Princess of Piombino, from Messina

Anna Maria Arduino (1672–1700) was an Italian regent, socialite, painter and writer. She was the regent of the Principality of Piombino during the minority of her son Prince Niccolò II Ludovisi in 1699–1700.

== Life ==
She was born in Messina, Italy in 1672, to Giovanna Furnari and Paolo Arduino, the Prince of Polizzi and Marquis of Floresta. She was a descendant of the Notarbartolo family, an aristocratic family of the Sicilian nobility. She authored writings and attended school under the pseudonym Getilde Faresia.

She was married in 1697 to the Prince of Piombino, Giovan Battista Ludovisi (1647– 24 August 1699) and together they had a child named Niccolò II Ludovisi (c.1698–1699) and lived in Rome. She attended the Pontifical Academy of Arcadia (Accademia dell'Arcadia) in 1697.

She wrote poems and sonnets in Latin and Italian under the pseudonym Getilde Faresia.

Her spouse died in 1699 and the principality succession fell to Niccolò II Ludovisi for a few months, after his father's death, and Anna Maria Arduino served as the Regent during his minority.

That same year, in 1699 her young son died. Arduino died shortly after in Naples, Italy on 29 December 1700 at the age of 28. She is buried in the church of San Diego all'Ospedaletto, her grave is shared with her son and the sepulchres are marked by two marble bas-reliefs that depict the son and the half-length of the mother, they were sculpted between 1703 and 1704 by Giacomo Colombo.
