= Niccolò Ludovisi =

Italian nobleman (1610-1664)

Niccolò I Ludovisi
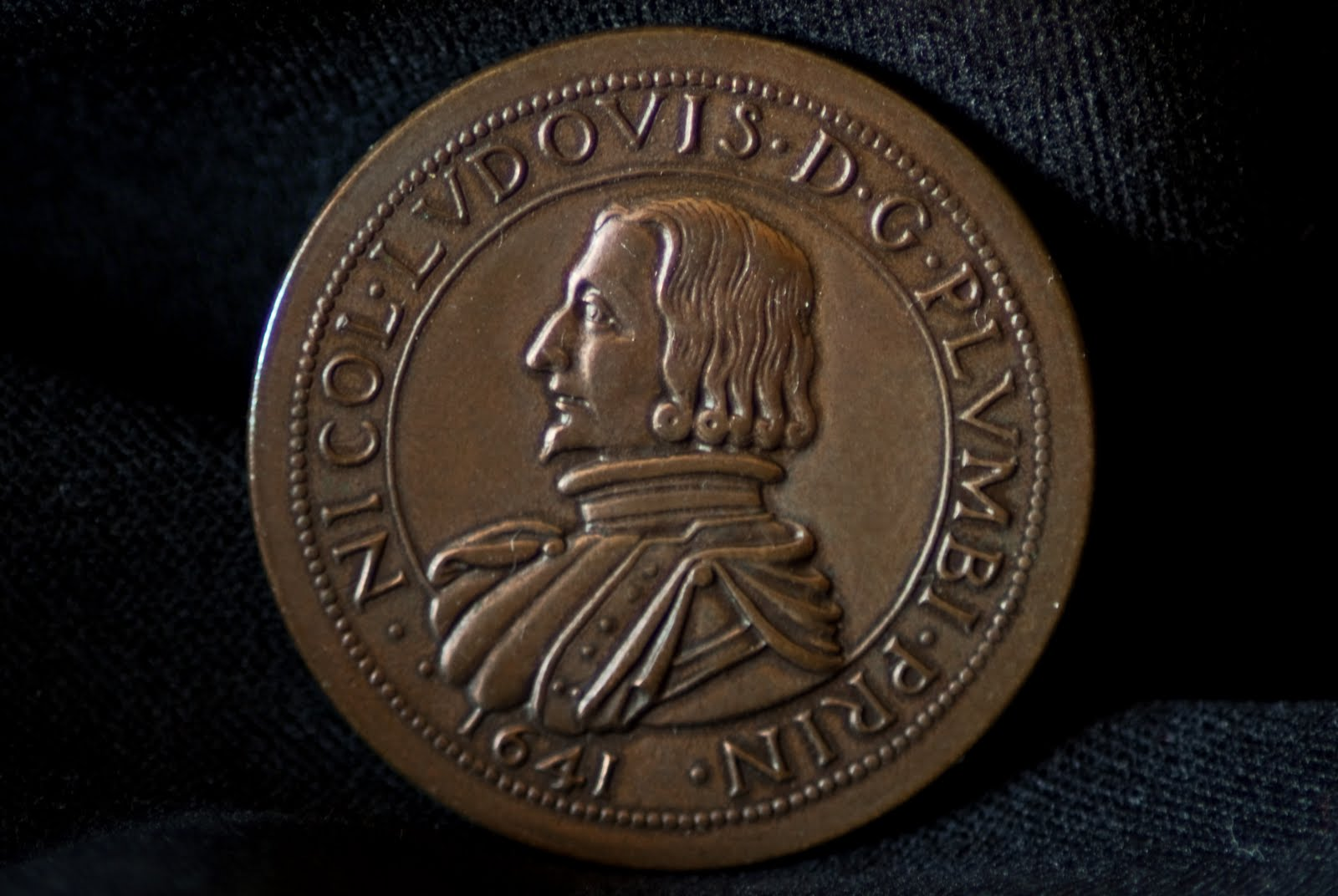

Prince of Piombino
- Reign: 1634–25 December 1664
- Predecessor: Philip IV of Spain
- Successor: Giovan Battista
- Born: 1610; Bologna
- Died: 25 December 1664 (aged 53–54); Cagliari
- Spouse: Isabella Gesualdo, 4th Princess of Venosa; Polissena de Mendoza-Appiani; Costanza Pamphili
- Issue: Lavinia, 5th Princess of Venosa; Gregorio Filippo; Giovan Battista, Prince of Poimbuno; Olimpia, Princess of Poimbino; Lavinia, Duchess of Atri; Ippolita, Princess of Poimbino; Nicolina
- House: Ludovisi
- Father: Orazio Ludovisi
- Mother: Lavinia Albergati

Niccolò I Ludovisi (1610 – 25 December 1664), 2nd Duke of Fiano and Zagarolo, was Prince of Piombino, Marquis of Populonia, Prince of Venosa and Count of Conza, Lord di Scarlino, Populonia, Vignale, Abbadia del Fango, Suvereto, Buriano, Cerboli e Palmaiolan, and Lord prince of the Tuscan Archipelago including the islands of Elba, Montecristo, Pianosa, Gorgona, Capraia, and Isola del Giglio from 1634 until his death.

== Family ==
He was born in Bologna, the son of Orazio Ludovisi, 1st Duke of Fiano and Zagarolo, patrician of Bologna and commander-in-chief of the Papal Army (as well as a brother of Pope Gregory XV), and wife Lavinia Albergati. He was the nephew of later-Cardinal Niccolò Albergati-Ludovisi. He was a brother of Ludovico Ludovisi who was made a cardinal by their uncle the pope.

== Marriages and legacy ==
Ludovisi was married three times.

He married firstly on 30 November 1622 Donna Isabella Gesualdo (Naples, June 1611 – Rome, 8 May 1629), 4th Princess of Venosa, 9th Countess of Conza, only daughter and heiress of Don Emanuele Gesualdo (Naples, 1588 - Torella, 20 August 1613), 8th Count of Conza, and wife as her first husband Martha Polyxèna, Countess zu Fürstenberg (Prague, 29 July 1588 - Atri, 31 May 1649), in turn only paternal granddaughter and heiress of Don Carlo Gesualdo, 3rd Prince of Venosa, and first wife as her third husband Donna Maria d'Avalos, and had:

- Donna Lavinia Ludovisi (1627 – 1634), 5th Princess of Venosa, 10th Countess of Conza, died in childhood

In 1632/1633 Niccolò married secondly Polissena de Mendoza-Appiani (? - 1642), second daughter and heiress of Giorgio de Mendoza, Count of Binasco, and wife and maternal niece Isabella Appiani, Princess of Piombino.

- Gregorio Filippo Ludovisi (1633 - c. 1637), died in childhood

His third marriage in 1644 was to Costanza Pamphili (1627 – 3 April 1665), daughter of Pamphilio Pamphili (c. 1564 - 29 August 1639) and wife (1614) Olimpia Maidalchini (c. 1593 - 1657), widow of Paolo Nini, Conservator of the Comune of Viterbo, sister of Maria Flaminia Pamphili (1619 - 1682), married on 12 October 1640 to Andrea Giustiniani, Marquess and 1st Prince of Bassano on 21 November 1644 (? - Rome, 1676), and had issue, and Camillo Francesco Maria Pamphili, 1st Prince of San Martino al Cimino and Valmontone, who married Niccolò Ludovisi's niece, Olimpia Aldobrandini. Her father, Pamphilio Pamphili, had moved to Naples with his wife Olimpia Maidalchini, after his brother, Cardinal Giovanni Battista Pamphili, (future Pope Innocent X), became papal nuncio to the Kingdom of Naples. They had:

- Giovan Battista Ludovisi (1647–1699), 3rd Duke of Fiano and Zagarolo, Prince of Piombino, etc, from 1664
- Olimpia Ludovisi (1656–1700), Princess of Piombino, etc (1700), unmarried
- Lavinia Ludovisi (1659–1682), married Giangirolamo, Duke of Atri, but had no issue
- Ippolita Ludovisi (1663–1733), Princess of Piombino, etc (1700–1733), married Don Gregorio II Boncompagni, 5th Duke of Sora, etc, Prince Consort of Piombino, etc, and had issue
- Nicolina Ludovisi (c. 1664 – 1665), died in infancy

Niccolò Ludovisi died in Cagliari and was succeeded in his state by his son Giovan Battista Ludovisi.

== Titles ==
Niccolò was recognized as the prince in 1634 after paying one million florins. He also inherited his father's titles, becoming marquis of Populonia and duke of Fiano.

He was Spanish viceroy in Aragon (1660–1662) and Sardinia (1662–1664) and in 1657 he was named a Knight of the Order of the Golden Fleece.

== Literature ==
Klaus Jaitner, Die Hauptinstruktionen Gregors XV.: Für die Nuntien und Gesandten an den europäischen Fürstenhöfen, 1621-1623, Bibliothek des Deutsches Historisches Institut in Rom, Max Niemeyer Verlag, 1997, pp. 167–178. ISBN 3-484-80146-8, ISBN 978-3-484-80146-2

Preceded by Philip IV	Prince of Piombino; 1634–1664	Succeeded by Giovan Battista Ludovisi
