= Orazio Ludovisi =

Italian nobleman, military commander and patrician of Bologna (1561–1640)

1st Duke of Fiano and Zagarolo
- Tenure: 1621–1624
- Successor: Niccolò Ludovisi
- Born: July 1561
- Died: 2-30 November 1624
- Offices: Gonfaloniere of the People (1611 and 1617)
- Noble family: Ludovisi
- Spouse: Lavinia Albergati
- Issue: Niccolò Ludovisi; Ludovico Ludovisi; Ippolita Ludovisi
- Father: Pompeo Ludovisi, Count of Samoggia
- Mother: Camilla Bianchini

Orazio Ludovisi (July 1561 – 2-30 November 1624) was an Italian nobleman, military commander and patrician of Bologna. During his brother's reign as Pope Gregory XV, he became Commander of the Papal Armies, Roman Noble and 1st Duke of Fiano and Zagarolo.

== Early life ==
Ludovisi was born in 1561, son of Pompeo Ludovisi (c. 1530 - 3 December 1565), Count of Samoggia (now Savigno in the Province of Bologna), Patrician of Bologna, Podestà of Loiano, and wife Camilla Bianchini (c. 1535 - 30 July 1591). He was the third of seven children. His siblings were Ludovico Ludovisi (1549 - Siena, 1585), married to Isotta Oldofredi, Girolamo Ludovisi (1552 - 3 October 1591), first husband of Laura Bianca Angelelli, Cardinal Alessandro Ludovisi, the third of seven children, Virginia Ludovisi (1555 - ?), married to Marcantonio Angelelli and Ippolita Ludovisi (1556 - ?), married firstly to Giulio Paltroni and married secondly to Giasone Visani.

He married Lavinia Albergati (c. 1575 - ?), daughter of Fabio Albergati (Bologna, 1538 - Bologna, 18 August 1606), Patrician of Bologna, and wife Flaminia Bentivoglio, and the two had a number of children including:

- Niccolò Ludovisi, who inherited his titles
- Ludovico Ludovisi, who was made Cardinal by Pope Gregory XV
- Ippolita Ludovisi (c. 1595 - Rome, 29 April 1674), who married firstly Giorgio Aldobrandini (1591 - 6 May 1637), Prince of Rossano, Count of Sarsina and Meldola, and was mother of Olimpia Aldobrandini, and married secondly as his first wife Flavio Orsini (4 March 1620 - Rome, 5 April 1698), Duke of Bracciano.

He was Gonfaloniere of the People in 1611 and 1617.

== Papacy of Gregory XV ==
In February 1621 Ludovisi's brother, Alessandro Ludovisi, was elected to the papal throne as Pope Gregory XV. A month later, on 13 March 1621, Ludovisi moved to Rome and was immediately appointed General of the Roman Catholic Church and Commander of the Papal Armies by his brother. Setting a precedent for his successor (Pope Urban VIII, who would later make habit commonplace), the Pope also purchased the comune of Fiano from the House of Sforza for 200,000 Écu and Ludovisi was duly appointed Duke of Fiano and also Duke of Zagarolo.

During his brother's reign, Ludovisi and his wife were patrons of the Bolognese painter Giovanni Valesio.
