= Francesco Gaetano =

Most Reverend Francesco Gaetano
- Titular Archbishop of Rhodus
- Church: Catholic Church
- In office: 1652–1670
- Predecessor: Karl Kaspar von Leyen-Hohengeroldseck
- Successor: Lorenzo Gavotti
- Previous post: Apostolic Nuncio to Spain (1652–1654)

Orders
- Consecration: 1 September 1652 by Fabio Chigi

Personal details
- Died: 17 March 1670

Francesco Gaetano or Francesco Caetani (died 1670) was a Roman Catholic prelate who served as Titular Archbishop of Rhodus (1652–1670) and Apostolic Nuncio to Spain (1652–1654).

== Biography ==
On 12 August 1652, Francesco Gaetano was appointed during the papacy of Pope Innocent X as Titular Archbishop of Rhodus. On 1 September 1652, he was consecrated bishop by Fabio Chigi, Cardinal-Priest of Santa Maria del Popolo, with Ranuccio Scotti Douglas, Bishop Emeritus of Borgo San Donnino, and Carlo Carafa della Spina, Bishop of Aversa, serving as co-consecrators. On 28 November 1652, he was appointed during the papacy of Pope Innocent X as Apostolic Nuncio to Spain until his resignation in December 1654. He served as Titular Archbishop of Rhodus until his death on 17 March 1670.

While bishop, he was the principal co-consecrator of Giovanni Battista del Tinto, Archbishop of Trani (1666).

== External links and additional sources ==
- Cheney, David M. "Rhodus (Titular See)". Catholic-Hierarchy.org. (for Chronology of Bishops) ^{[self-published]}
- Chow, Gabriel. "Archdiocese of Rhodes". GCatholic.org. (for Chronology of Bishops) ^{[self-published]}
- Cheney, David M. "Nunciature to Spain". Catholic-Hierarchy.org. ^{[self-published]}
- Chow, Gabriel. "Apostolic Nunciature Spain". GCatholic.org. Archived from the original on 2018-07-02. ^{[self-published]}

Catholic Church titles
Preceded by Giulio Rospigliosi	Apostolic Nuncio to Spain; 1652–1654	Succeeded by Camillo Massimi
Preceded by Karl Kaspar von Leyen-Hohengeroldseck	Titular Archbishop of Rhodus; 1652–1670	Succeeded by Lorenzo Gavotti
