= Luigi Veronelli =

Italian food writer (1926–2004)

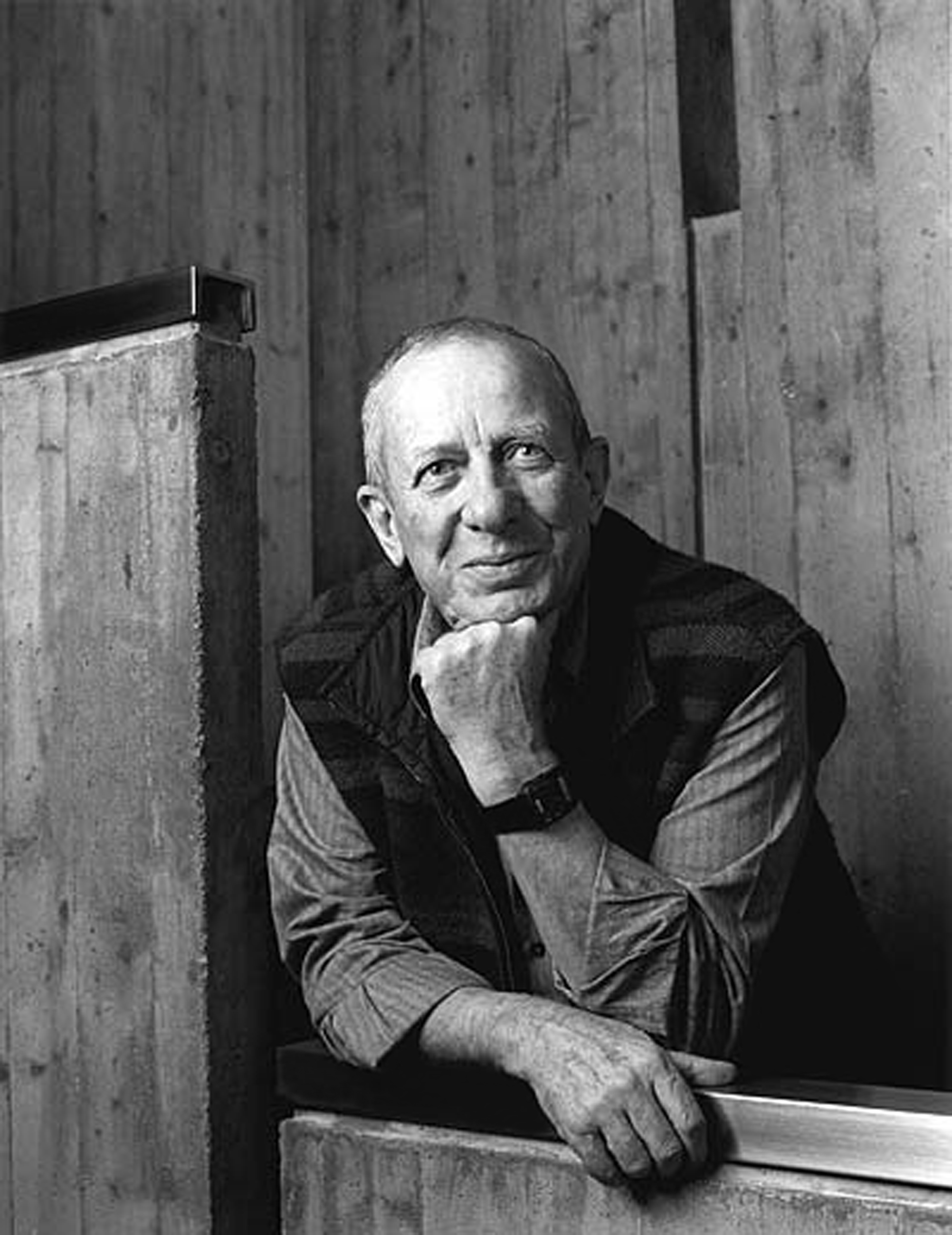
Luigi Veronelli

Luigi Veronelli (2 February 1926 in Milan – 29 November 2004 in Bergamo) was an Italian gastronome, wine critic, anarchist and intellectual.

== Career ==
In 1990, Luigi Veronelli founded the Veronelli publishing house with "the specific objective of thoroughly classifying the immense national gastronomic inheritance and contributing to the heightening of awareness of the touristic appeal of the loveliest country in the world".

His classical training was evident in his writing, and he was often described as ‘the bard’ as he coined many of the common phrases used to describe Italian wine. ‘Vino da meditazione’ for particularly structured, complex, and often sweet, wines that require time and calm to be appreciated intellectually; and ‘Vino da favola’ (which means fairy tale wine, instead of Vino da tavola) are just a few examples. Italian wine producers recognized him as their guru. In the words of Bruno Giacosa: "Gino (as he was known to friends) was all heart, he was the first person to teach us that a great wine was born in the vineyards. He was the first to point out the absolute necessity of carefully selecting grapes in the vineyards, the importance of terroir, of realising the potential of one vineyard or cru over another. He believed Italian wine could be brought to exceptional levels if we worked closely with the earth. Back in the (19)60s and (19)70s, no one thought like this. He truly was a pioneer."
