= Sarsina =

- Comune
- Comune di Sarsina
- Cathedral of St Vicinius.

- Coat of arms

- Location within Italy Location within Emilia-Romagna
- Coordinates: 43°55′10″N 12°08′35″E
- Country: Italy
- Region: Emilia-Romagna
- Province: Forlì-Cesena (FC)
- Frazioni: Calbano, Pieve di Rivoschio, Quarto, Ranchio, Sorbano, Tezzo, Turrito

Government
  - Mayor: Malio Bartolini

Area
  - Total: 100 km^{2} (39 sq mi)
- Elevation: 243 m (797 ft)

Population (31 May 2007)
  - Total: 3,659
  - Density: 37/km^{2} (95/sq mi)
- Demonym: Sarsinati
- Time zone: UTC+1 (CET)
  - Summer (DST): UTC+2 (CEST)
- Postal code: 47027
- Dialing code: 0547
- Patron saint: Vicinius of Sarsina
- Saint day: August 28
- Website: Official website www.sarsina.info

Sarsina (Romagnol: Sêrsna) is an Italian town situated in the province of Forlì-Cesena, Emilia-Romagna, northern Italy, in the Tuscan-Romagnolo Apennines.

== History ==
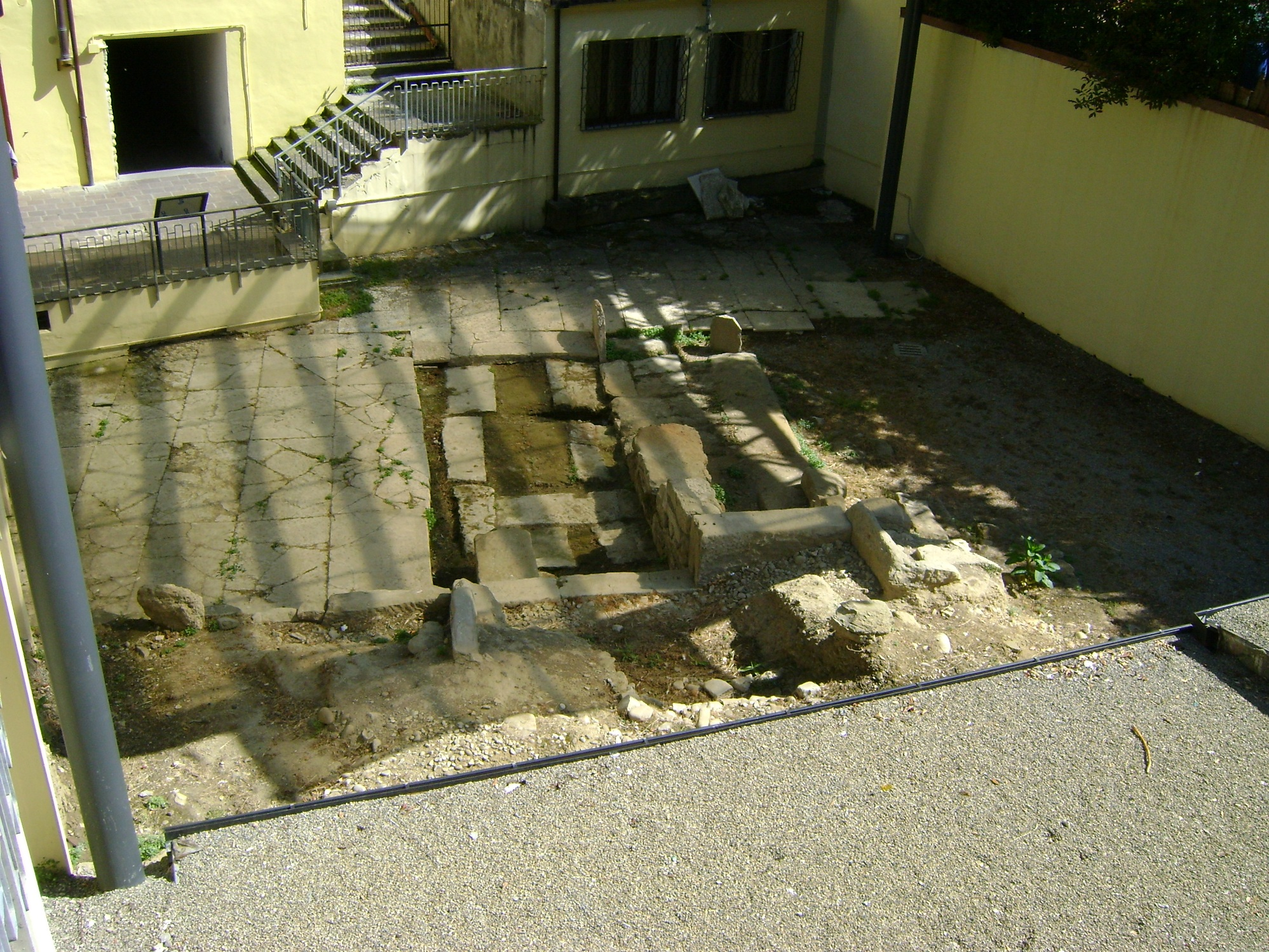
Remains of the Roman forum.

Ancient Sarsina or Sassina was a town of the Umbri in the Savio River valley. In 266 BC Roman consuls celebrated a triumph over the Sassinates. It is mentioned in the Fasti, and in the enumeration of the Italian allies of the Romans in 225 BCE the Umbri and Sassinates are mentioned, on an equal footing, as providing 20,000 men between them. It is possible that the tribus Sapinia (the name of which is derived from the river Sapis) mentioned by Livy in the account of the Roman marches against the Boii in 201 BC and 196 BC formed a part of the Sassinates. Remains of the Roman forum and necropolis can still be seen.

The playwright Plautus was a native of Sassina. The town had a strategic importance, as inscriptions, preserved in the local museum, show. Its milk is frequently mentioned; it was the centre of a pasture district and it provided a number of recruits for the Praetorian Guard.

Sarsina suffered devastation towards the end of the 3rd century, perhaps attributable to barbarian tribes, as evidenced by signs of fire on the floors of some houses, with further incursions by the Visigoths and the Heruli between 409 and 470.

Saint Vicinius of Sarsina was the first bishop of Sarsina from around 303 to 330, the year of his death. In the 10th century the bishops obtained the temporal sovereignty of the city and the surrounding district, which thus became a prince-bishopric and construction of the cathedral began around the year 1000.

From 1327 until 1400 it was disputed by the Ordelaffi of Forlì, the popes and the bishops. In the fifteenth century it was subject in turn to the Malatesta family of Cesena, and then to the Malatesta branch of Rimini, from whom it was taken by Cesare Borgia (1500–03), on whose death it was captured by the Venetians (1503–09).

In 1518 it was enfeoffed to the Pio di Meldola, passing later to the Aldobrandini.

In a reprisal action in 1944, the German Wehrmacht killed or injured many people and burned down several public buildings and private houses.

On 25 August 2008 Ennio Morricone premiered his composition Vuoto d'anima piena), a work for vocalists, an orchestra of 40 and a choir of 60, in the cathedral. The text is based on texts by the Persian mystic Rumi.

== Main sights ==
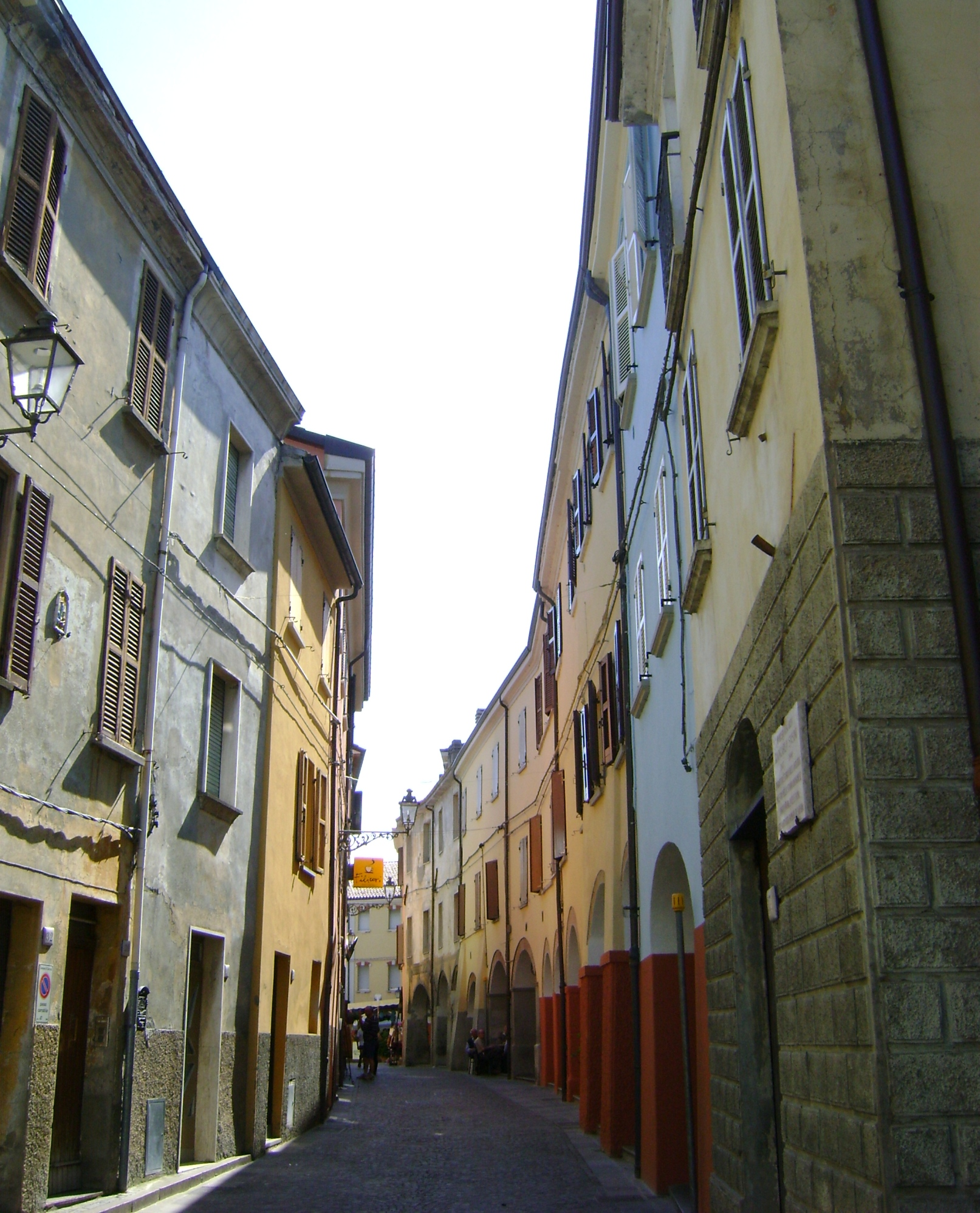
Via Cesio Sabino.

The city contains the remains of the Roman forum and several ancient buildings, one of which probably was the public baths. Furthermore, remains of temples and fortifications have been found, as well as a number of urns, pillars, bronze objects, etc.

Romanesque Sarsina cathedral dating back to around the year 1000.

The adjacent Sanctuary of San Vicinio (Saint Vicinius) is a place of veneration.

Via Cesio Sabino is the main street of the old town, with some houses made of marble.

The archaeological museum holds remains from the Roman era.

== Economy ==
Besides agriculture and cattle breeding, the principal employments of the population are the sulphur and manganese industries. There are some charcoal deposits and sulphur springs.

== Twin towns ==
- Grebenstein, Germany
- Lezoux, France
- Lopik, the Netherlands

== See also ==
- Bishopric of Sassina
