= Ludovisi (family) =

Prominent family in Rome, Venetian patrician family

- Coat of arms of Ludovisi family
- Country: Papal States; Principality of Piombino; Crown of Aragon; Kingdom of Sardinia
- Founded: 15th century
- Founder: Bertrando di Monterenzi
- Titles: Pope (non-hereditary); Prince of Piombino; Viceroy of Aragon; Viceroy of Sardinia; Prince of Gallicano; Prince of Venosa; Duke of Fiano; Duke of Zagarolo; Marquis of Populonia; Senator of Bologna
- Deposition: 1700; 326 years ago (male line); 1733; 293 years ago (female line)
- Cadet branches: Boncompagni-Ludovisi

The House of Ludovisi was an Italian noble family, originating from Bologna. They had close ties with the Papacy and were influential in the Papal States. Alessandro Ludovisi became a cardinal and later Pope Gregory XV. His cardinal-nephew was Ludovico Ludovisi.

Beginning in 1634 with Niccolò I Ludovisi, one branch of the family ruled the Principality of Piombino. They owned the Villa Ludovisi in Rome. In 1894, they sold their art collection to the state. Alberico Boncompagni Ludovisi, prince of Venosa, was a winemaker at his estate Fiorano from the late 1940s to 1995.

== Origins ==
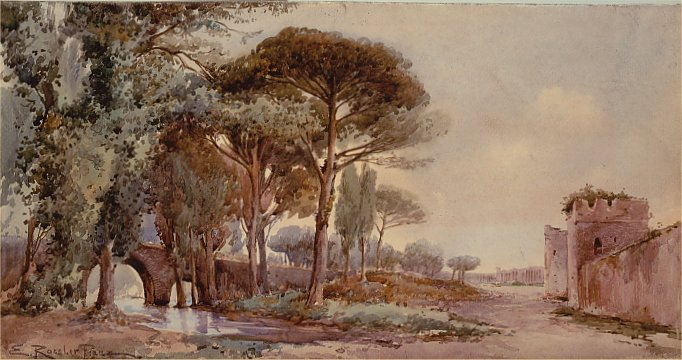
Villa Ludovisi in the 1880s

The Ludovisi were an ancient noble family originally from Bologna. It originated from a certain Bertrando di Monterenzio, also called Bertrando di Monterenzoli (the name derived from that of a Bolognese castle), who was adopted by his maternal uncle Giovanni Ludovisi, without descendants and with whom the family would have died out. Bertrando then inherited the surname and the coat of arms of the Ludovisi, and, through his descendants, began a new dynasty. During his political career, he was a member of the Council of the Elders of Bologna from 1458 to 1465. His son, Girolamo Ludovisi, was a senator and gonfalonier of Bologna, only to be deposed by the Bentivoglio family in 1511 and murdered. Girolamo's son, Niccolò Ludovisi, was count of Samoggia and Tiola and again a senator. But it was from Ludovico Ludovisi, brother of Niccolò, and from his son, Pompeo Ludovisi, that the one who gave the real beginning to the fortunes of the dynasty was born: Alessandro Ludovisi, future Pope Gregory XV.

== Ludovisi treasures ==
- Ludovisi Battle sarcophagus
- Ludovisi Gaul
- Ludovisi Dionysus
- Ludovisi Throne
