= Ludovico Ludovisi =

Catholic cardinal (1595–1632)

His Eminence Ludovico Ludovisi
- Cardinal, Archbishop of Bologna
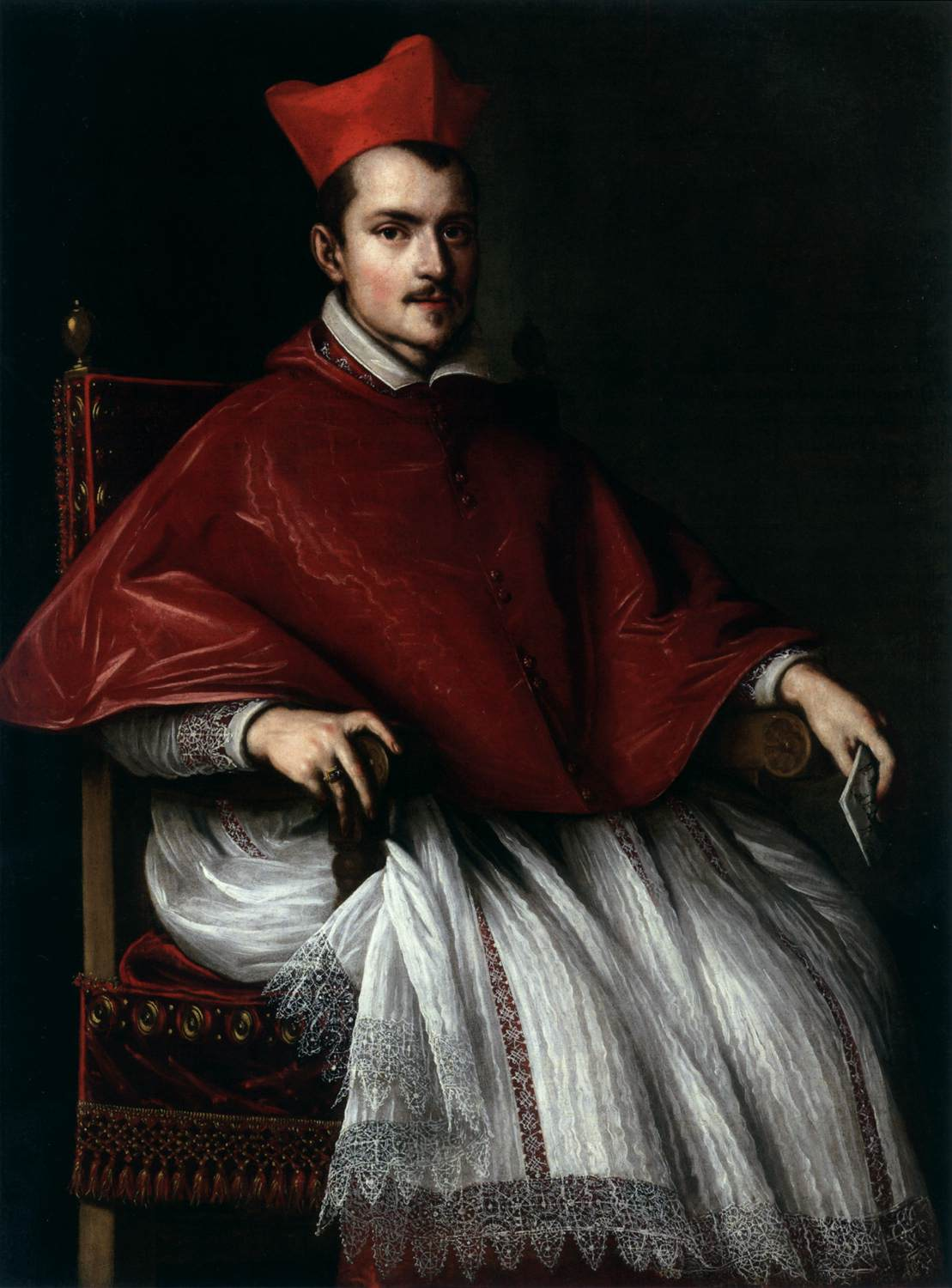
- Portrait by Ottavio Leoni, 1621
- Church: Catholic Church
- Archdiocese: Bologna
- Appointed: 27 March 1621
- Term ended: 18 November 1632
- Predecessor: Alessandro Ludovisi
- Successor: Girolamo Colonna
- Other post: Cardinal-Priest of San Lorenzo in Damaso
- Previous post: Camerlengo of the Holy Roman Church (1621-1623) Cardinal-priest of Santa Maria in Traspontina (1621-1623)

Orders
- Consecration: 2 May 1621 by Galeazzo Sanvitale
- Created cardinal: 17 March 1621 by Pope Gregory XV
- Rank: Cardinal-priest

Personal details
- Born: 27 October 1595 Bologna, Papal States
- Died: 18 November 1632 (aged 37) Bologna, Papal States
- Coat of arms

Ludovico Ludovisi (22 or 27 October 1595 – 18 November 1632) was an Italian cardinal and statesman of the Roman Catholic Church. He was an art connoisseur who formed a famous collection of antiquities, housed at the Villa Ludovisi in Rome.

== Biography ==
Ludovico Ludovisi was born in Bologna, then part of the Papal States, the son of Orazio Ludovisi and Lavinia Albergati. Following in the footsteps of his uncle Alessandro Ludovisi, he was trained at the Jesuit Collegio Germanico in Rome, and went on to the University of Bologna, where he received his doctorate in canon law on 25 February 1615.

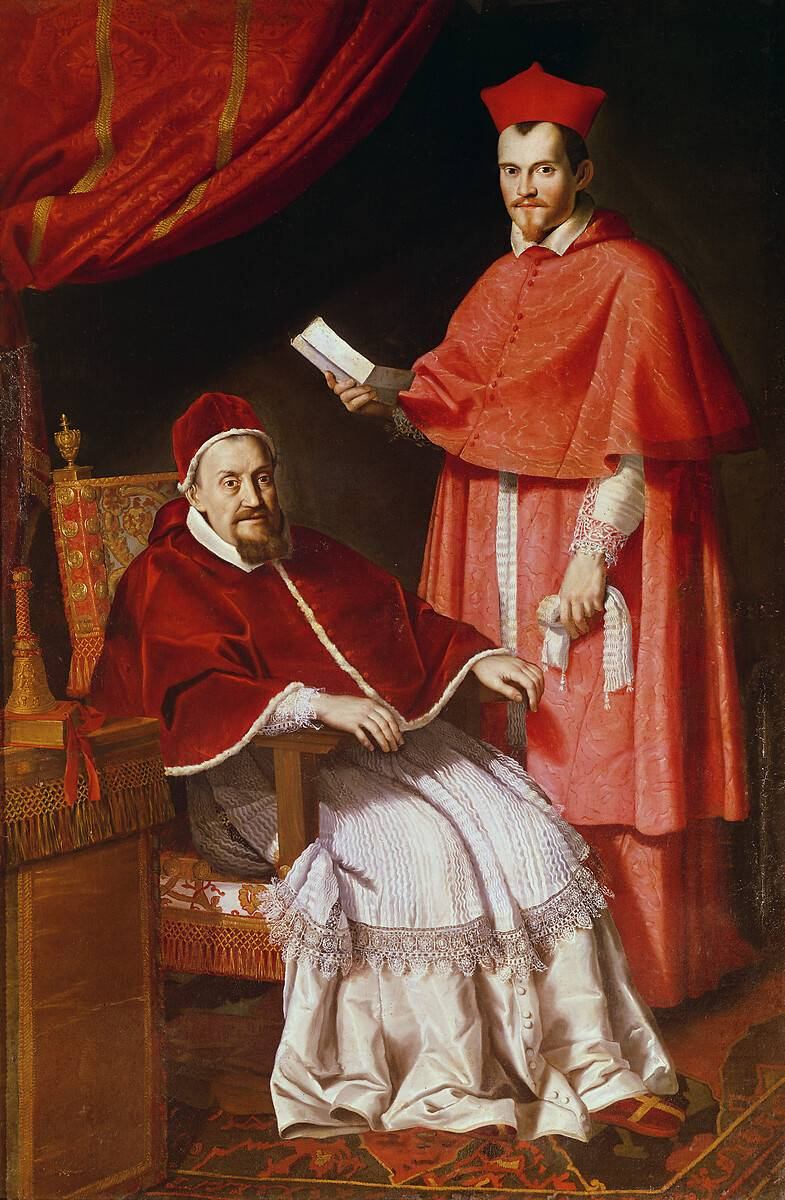
Pope Gregory XV with his Cardinal-Nephew of unprecedented income and authority, Ludovico Ludovisi, known as il cardinale padrone (the Cardinal Boss).

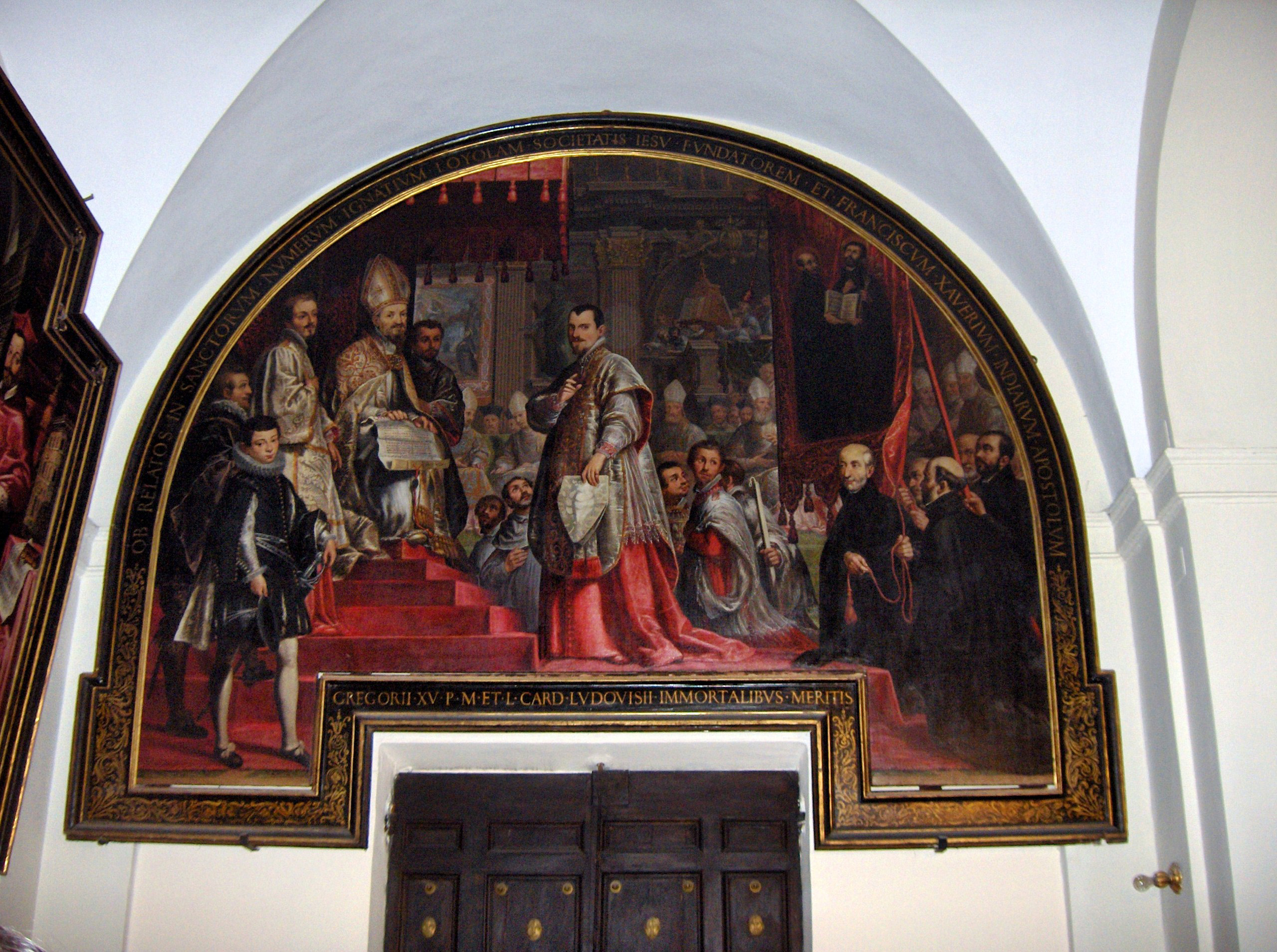
Pope Gregory XV and his nephew Cardinal Ludovico Ludovisi.

When Alessandro Ludovisi was acclaimed pope, taking the name Gregory XV, Ludovico was made cardinal the day after his coronation, though he was only 25. The following month he was made archbishop of Bologna, though he remained in Rome. His uncle had great faith in his judgement and energy and was in need of a strong and able assistant to help govern the Papal States (the Pope was, after all, in his late 60s). On the same day, Orazio Ludovisi, Ludovico's father, was put at the head of the pontifical army. Gregory XV was not disappointed in his nephew. As the Catholic Encyclopedia avers:

Ludovico, it is true, advanced the interests of his family in every possible way, but he also used his brilliant talents and his great influence for the welfare of the Church, and was sincerely devoted to the pope.

He was sent as legate in Fermo in 1621 and in Avignon, 1621–1623. He served briefly as Camerlengo of the Holy Roman Church (19 April 1621 to 7 June 1623).

In August 1623, Ludovisi participated in the papal conclave that elected Pope Urban VIII. Due to conflict with the new pope's family, Ludovisi was then forced to leave Rome.

He continued, however, as prefect of the sacred consulta of the Propaganda Fide (1622 to 1632) and Vice-Chancellor of the Holy Roman Church (1623 to 1632). He died in Bologna in 1632.

== Patron of the arts ==
Cardinal Ludovisi is remembered as a connoisseur and patron of arts. He paid for the construction of the Jesuit Chiesa di Sant'Ignazio and Palazzo Ludovisi (now Palazzo Montecitorio), where Gian Lorenzo Bernini was his architect. He rapidly assembled from private owners and the Carmelite brothers of Santa Maria in Traspontina a holding of vineyards and small plots to create the Villa Ludovisi, a vast complex of gardens and buildings on the Monte Pincio near Porta Pinciana, in the so-called "Gardens of Sallust" on the site where Julius Caesar and his heir, Augustus, had had their villas. The Ludovisi Ares, a spectacular discovery of 1622, found its way quickly to the collection. He employed Alessandro Algardi to restore other finds, some of which were unearthed in the grounds of the Villa itself. The sculpture was lightly restored by Bernini and joined the Dying Gaul in the Cardinal's gallery. The Ludovisi collection was enlarged with purchases from Cardinal Altemps' collection, all housed at the splendid Villa Ludovisi, which he surrounded with gardens. Guercino painted frescoes at the villa, and Cardinal Ludovisi's house poet was Alessandro Tassoni.

At the casino of the Villa, Cardinal Ludovisi employed Carlo Maderno to rebuild a simple house further up the hill. In a small ground-floor gallery of the casino, Guercino frescoed a ceiling with his Chariot of Aurora (1621–1623). It remains one of the most famous painted decors of Rome.

His cousin, Niccolò Albergati-Ludovisi, was made cardinal in 1645.

== Episcopal succession ==
Episcopal succession of Ludovico Ludovisi

While bishop, he was the principal consecrator of:

- Aurelio Archinto, Bishop of Como (1621);
- Giuseppe Acquaviva, Titular Archbishop of Thebae (1621);
- Pierre François Maletti, Bishop of Nice (1622);
- Carlo Bovi, Bishop of Bagnoregio (1622);
- Marco Antonio Gozzadini, Bishop of Tivoli (1622);
- Luigi Caetani, Titular Patriarch of Antioch (1622);
- Giovanni Pietro Volpi, Auxiliary Bishop of Novara (1622);
- Alfonso Manzanedo de Quiñones, Titular Patriarch of Jerusalem (1622);
- Giovanni Battista Agucchi, Titular Archbishop of Amasea (1623); and
- Francisco Sánchez Villanueva y Vega, Archbishop of Taranto (1628).
