= Pope Gregory XV =

Head of the Catholic Church from 1621 to 1623

- Bishop of Rome
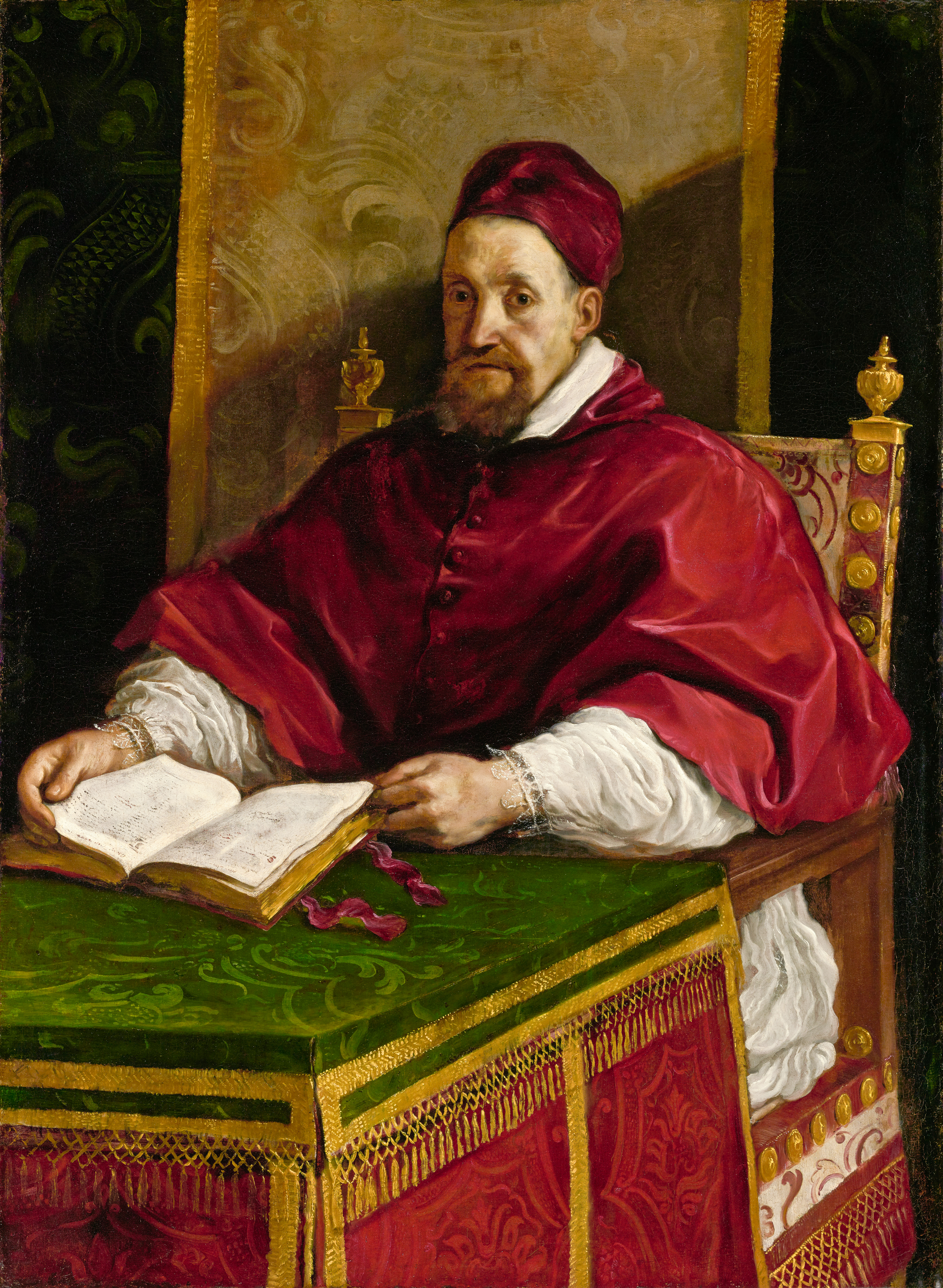
- Portrait by Guercino, 1622 (oil on canvas, Getty Center, Los Angeles)
- Church: Catholic Church
- Papacy began: 9 February 1621
- Papacy ended: 8 July 1623
- Predecessor: Paul V
- Successor: Urban VIII
- Previous posts: Referendary of the Apostolic Signatura (1593–1596); Vicegerent of Rome (1597–1598); Auditor of the Sacred Roman Rota (1599–1612); Archbishop of Bologna (1612–1621); Cardinal-Priest with no Title assigned (1616–1618); Cardinal-Priest of Santa Maria in Traspontina (1618–1621)

Orders
- Consecration: 1 May 1612 by Scipione Cardinal Caffarelli-Borghese
- Created cardinal: 19 September 1616 by Paul V

Personal details
- Born: Alessandro Ludovisi; 9 January 1554 Bologna, Papal States
- Died: 8 July 1623 (aged 69) Rome, Papal States
- Education: University of Bologna
- Signature: Gregory XV's signature

- Coat of arms: Gregory XV's coat of arms

Pope Gregory XV (Latin: Gregorius XV; Italian: Gregorio XV; 9 January 1554 – 8 July 1623), born Alessandro Ludovisi, was the head of the Catholic Church and ruler of the Papal States from 9 February 1621 until his death in 1623. He is notable for founding the Congregation for the Propagation of the Faith, an organization tasked with overseeing the spread of Catholicism and missionary work. Gregory XV was also responsible for the canonization of Saints Ignatius of Loyola, Francis Xavier, Teresa of Ávila, and Philip Neri, which solidified his commitment to the Counter-Reformation.

== Biography ==
Papal styles of Pope Gregory XV
- Reference style: His Holiness
- Spoken style: Your Holiness
- Religious style: Holy Father
- Posthumous style: None

=== Early life ===
Alessandro Ludovisi was born in Bologna on 9 January 1554 to Pompeo Ludovisi, Count of Samoggia (now Savigno in the Province of Bologna) and Camilla Bianchini. He was the third of seven children.

He was educated at the Roman College run by the Society of Jesus in Rome, and also at the German College in Rome. He later attended the University of Bologna to obtain degrees in canon and Roman law, which he received on 4 June 1575. His early career was as a papal jurist in Rome, and there is no evidence that he had been ordained to the priesthood.

He returned to Rome in 1575 and he served as the Referendary of the Apostolic Signatura from 1593 to 1596 and was appointed as the Vicegerent of Rome in 1597, a position he maintained until 1598. He also served as the Auditor of the Sacred Roman Rota from 1599 to 1612.

On 12 March 1612, Pope Paul V appointed him as the Archbishop of Bologna, for which he was presumably ordained to the priesthood and then, he was consecrated a bishop on 1 May of that year in the church of Sant'Andrea al Quirinale in Rome.

In August 1616, the pope sent him as Apostolic Nuncio to the Duchy of Savoy, to mediate between Charles Emmanuel I, Duke of Savoy and Philip III of Spain in their dispute concerning the Gonzaga Duchy of Montferrat. (Note: The dispute eventually led to the War of the Mantuan Succession, which lasted 1628–31.)

On 19 September 1616, Pope Paul V elevated him to the cardinalate and on 3 December 1618, appointed him as a Cardinal Priest with the titular church of Santa Maria in Traspontina.

== Papacy ==
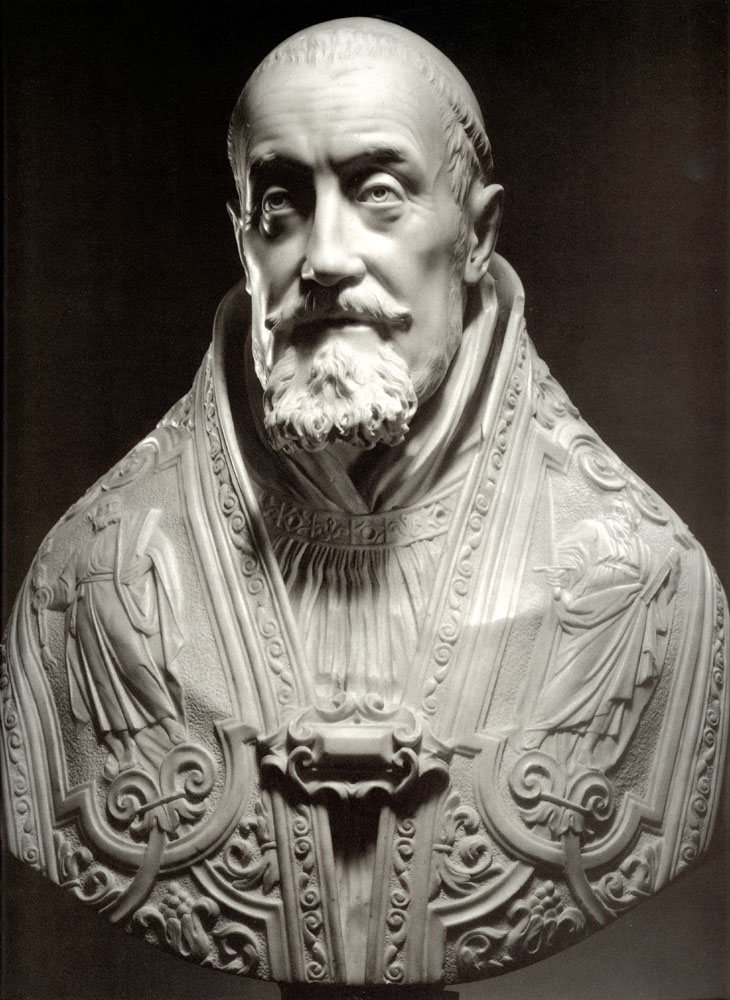
Bust of Pope Gregory XV, 1621 by Gian Lorenzo Bernini

=== Papal conclave ===
Ludovisi remained in his episcopal see in Bologna until he went to Rome after the death of Pope Paul V to take part in the conclave at which he was chosen as pope and he selected the pontifical name of "Gregory XV". He was crowned on 14 February 1621 by the protodeacon, Cardinal Andrea Baroni Peretti Montalto, and assumed possession of the Basilica of Saint John Lateran on 14 May 1621.

At the moment of his election, chiefly through the influence of Cardinal Scipione Borghese, at his advanced age (he was 67) and with his weak state of health he saw at once that he would need an energetic man, in whom he could place implicit confidence, to assist him in the government of the Church. His nephew Ludovico Ludovisi, a young man of 25 years, seemed to him to be the right person and, at the risk of being charged with nepotism, he created him cardinal on the third day of his pontificate. On the same day, his youngest brother Orazio was appointed Captain General of the Church at the head of the Papal army.

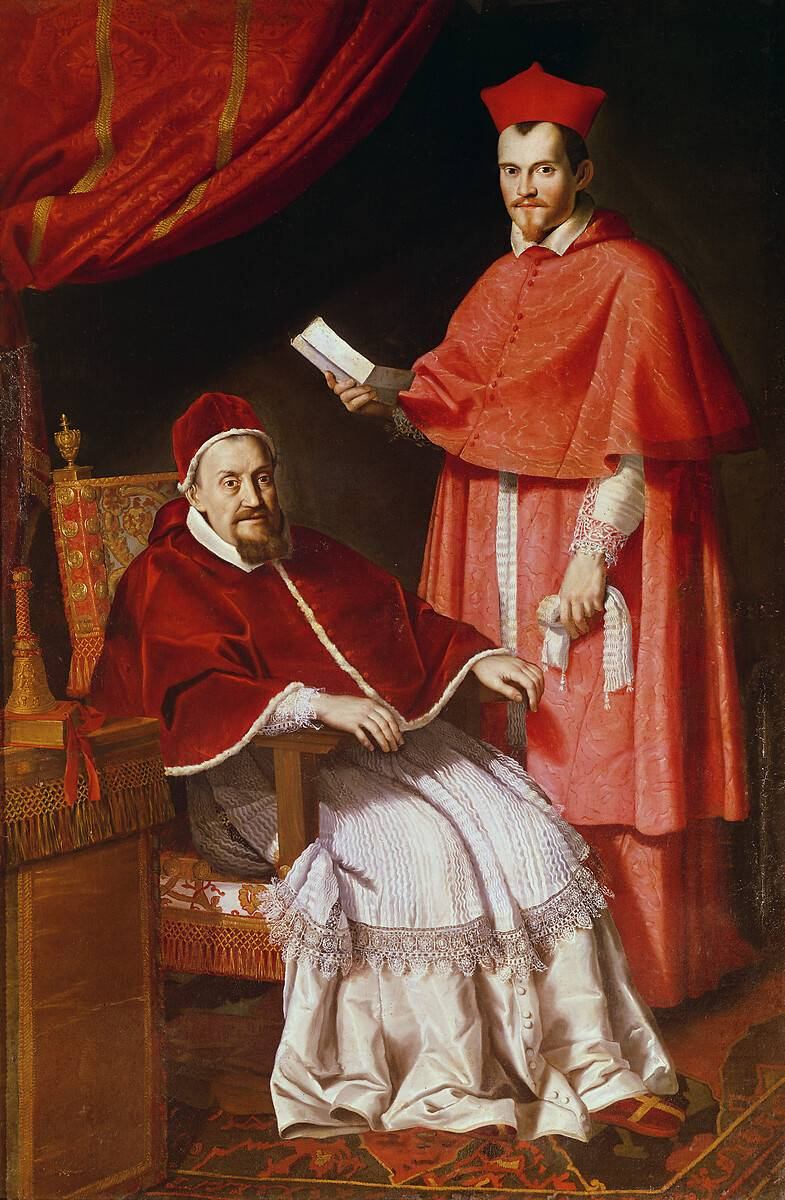
Pope Gregory XV with his cardinal-nephew of unprecedented income and authority, Ludovico Ludovisi, known as il cardinale padrone

The future revealed that Gregory XV was not disappointed in his nephew. The Catholic Encyclopedia allows that "Ludovico, it is true, advanced the interests of his family in every possible way, but he also used his brilliant talents and his great influence for the welfare of the Church, and was sincerely devoted to the pope". Gregory secured for the Ludovisi two dukedoms, one for his brother Orazio, made a Nobile Romano and Duke of Fiano Romano, 1621, and the other, the Duchy of Zagarolo, purchased from the Colonna family by his nephew Ludovico Ludovisi in 1622. A second nephew, Niccolò, was made reigning Prince of Piombino and Lord of the Isola d'Elba in 1634, having married the heiress, 30 March 1632.

=== Actions ===
Gregory XV interfered little in European politics, beyond assisting Ferdinand II, Holy Roman Emperor, and the Catholic League against the Protestants, to the tune of a million gold ducats, and Sigismund III Vasa, King of the Polish–Lithuanian Commonwealth, against the Ottoman Empire. His Declaration against Magicians and Witches (Omnipotentis Dei, 20 March 1623) was the last papal ordinance against witchcraft. Former punishments were lessened, and the death penalty was limited to those who were "proved to have entered into a compact with the devil, and to have committed homicide with his assistance".

He was a learned theologian and manifested a reforming spirit. As an example, his papal bull of 15 November 1621, Aeterni Patris Filius, regulated papal elections, which henceforth were to be by secret ballot; three methods of election were allowed: by scrutiny, compromise and quasi-inspiration. Whereas Popes Gregory XIII and Clement VIII had previously established temporary congregations of cardinals to look after the interest of particular foreign missions, Gregory XV established a permanent congregation, the Congregation for the Propagation of the Faith, on 6 January 1622, to operate as the missionary arm of the Holy See.

He was influential in bringing the Bolognese artist Guercino to Rome, a landmark in the development of the High Baroque style. He sat for his portrait busts, one of which was by Gian Lorenzo Bernini and by Alessandro Algardi, whose restrained bust in a tondo is in the Church of Santa Maria in Vallicella.

=== Consistories ===
The pope created eleven cardinals in four consistories that saw him elevate his nephew Ludovico and his cousin Marcantonio Gozzadini as cardinals; he also elevated the noted Armand Jean Richelieu as a cardinal.

=== Canonizations and beatifications ===
On 12 March 1622, the pope canonized several saints: Francis Xavier, Ignatius of Loyola, Isidore the Laborer, Philip Neri and Teresa of Ávila.

Gregory XV also beatified three individuals during his pontificate: Ambrose Sansedoni of Siena, Albert the Great, and Peter of Alcantara.

=== Death and burial ===
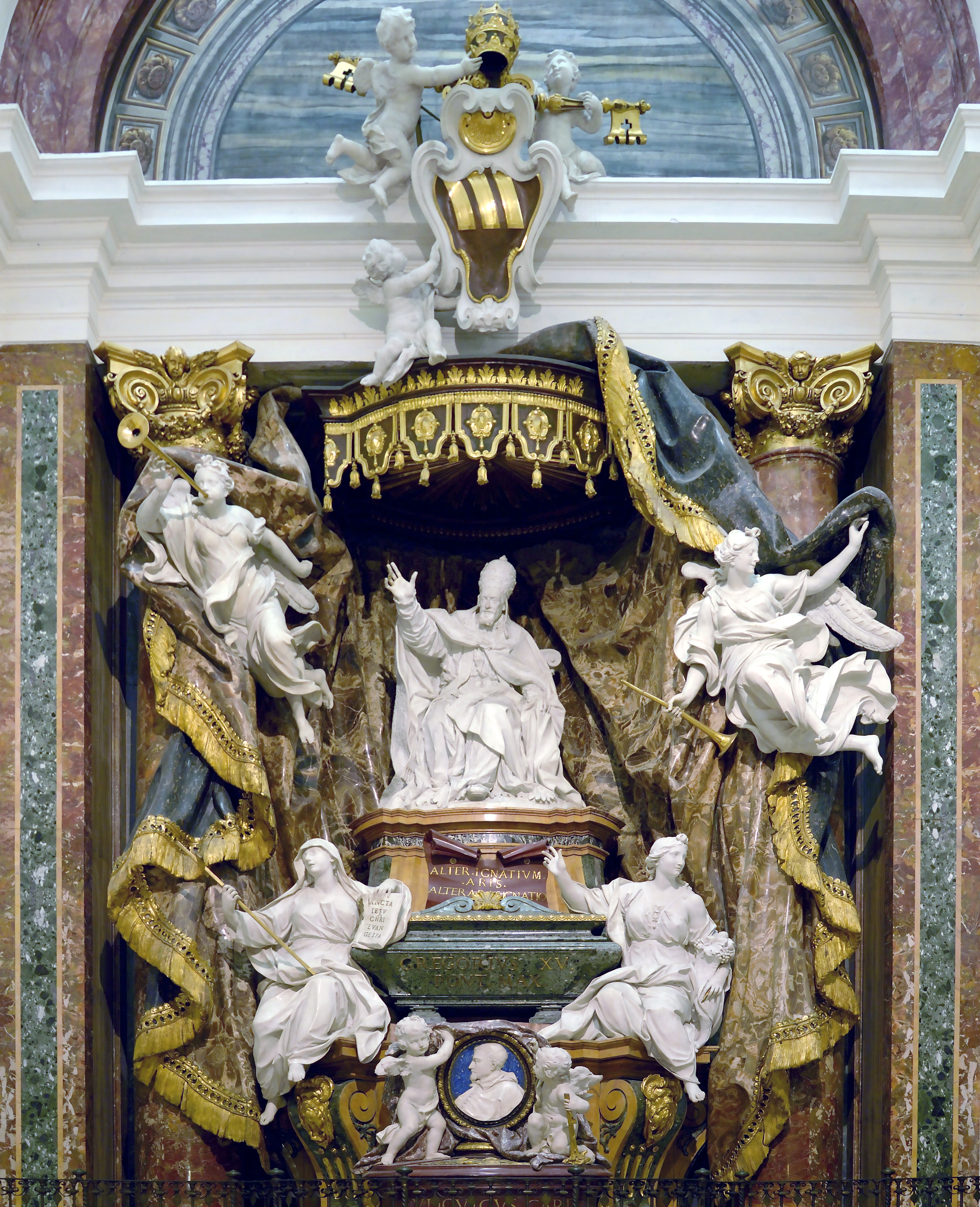
Monument to Pope Gregory XV and Cardinal Ludovico Ludovisi in Sant'Ignazio, by Pierre Le Gros the Younger (c. 1709–1714)

He had been suffering from kidney stones for some time and was bedridden from 16 June to 1 July 1623, having been suffering from diarrhea and a stomach disorder that caused him great discomfort. His condition worsened on 4 July, as a fever greatly weakened him, leading to his receiving the Viaticum on 5 July and the Extreme Unction on 6 July, before succumbing to his illness two days later.

Pope Gregory XV died in the Quirinal Palace on 8 July 1623. He was buried in the Church of Sant'Ignazio where more than 80 years later, the Jesuits erected a magnificent monument following the wish of Cardinal Ludovico Ludovisi, who was also honoured in this monument.

Gregory XV was succeeded by Pope Urban VIII.

== See also ==
- Cardinals created by Gregory XV
- Ludovisi

== Sources ==
- "Alessandro Ludovisi". Cardinals of the Holy Roman Church.
- "Alessandro Ludovisi, no. F3". Genealogy of the Ludovisi. Archived from the original on 10 May 2006.

Attribution:

Catholic Church titles
Preceded by Scipione Borghese	Archbishop of Bologna; 12 March 1612 – 9 February 1621	Succeeded by Ludovico Ludovisi
Preceded by Erminio Valenti	Cardinal-Priest of Santa Maria in Traspontina; 3 December 1618 – 9 February 1621	Succeeded by Ludovico Ludovisi
Preceded by Paul V	Pope; 9 February 1621 – 8 July 1623	Succeeded by Urban VIII
