= Villa Giulia (disambiguation) =

Villa Giulia is a villa in Rome, Italy.

Other notable Villa Giulias in Italy include:

- Villa Giulia, Bellagio
- Villa Giulia, Naples
- Villa Giulia, Palermo
- Villa Giulia, San Giorgio a Cremano, a villa in San Giorgio a Cremano
- Villa Giulia, Trieste, a public park in Trieste
- Villa Giulia, Ventotene, a Roman imperial villa or palace on Ventotene
- Villa Giulia, Verbania, a villa in Verbania
