= Dying Gaul =

Roman copy of Greek sculpture

- Galata Morente (Italian)
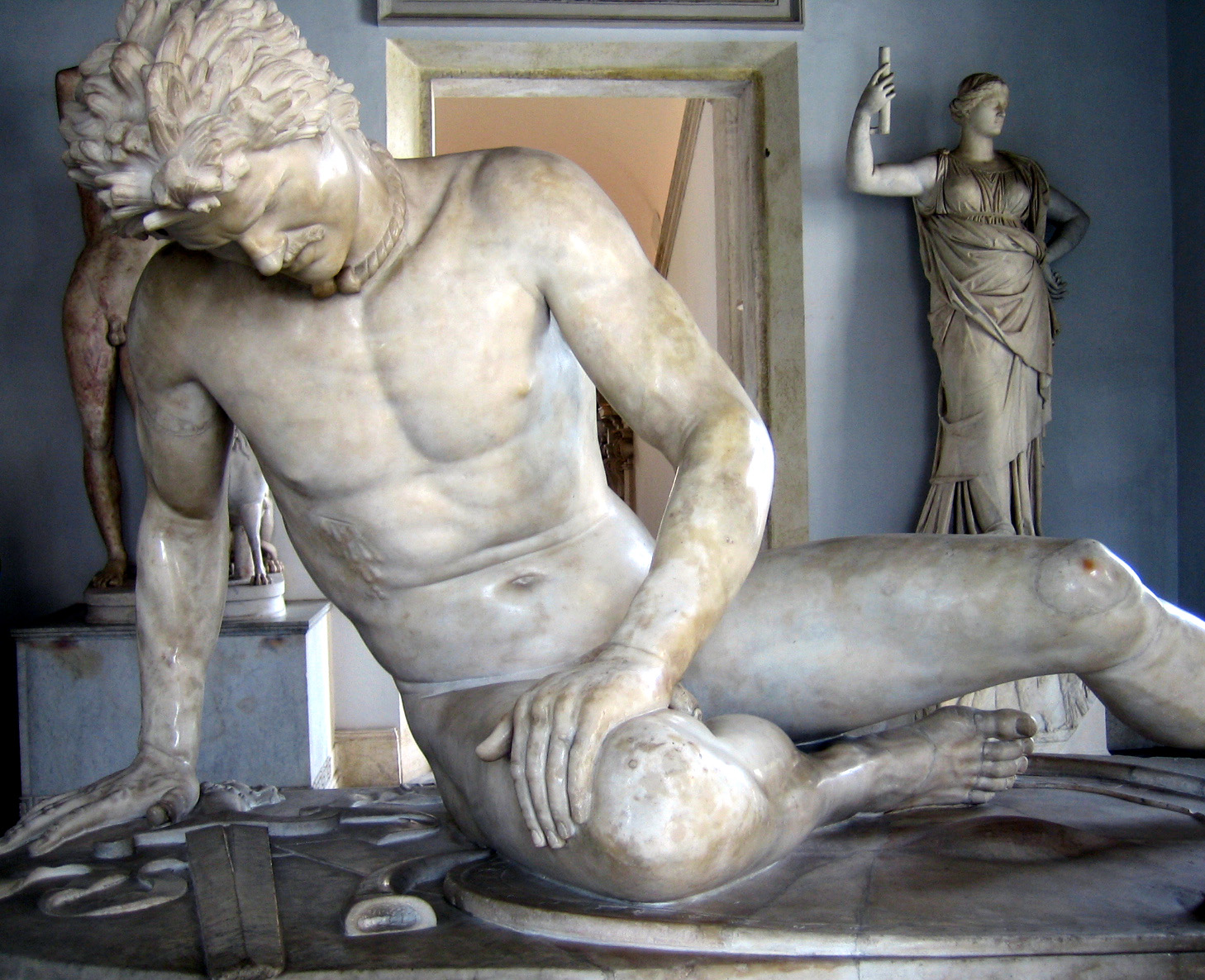
- Medium: Marble
- Dimensions: 93 cm × 186 cm × 89 cm (3 ft 1 in × 6 ft 1 in × 2 ft 11 in)
- Location: Capitoline Museums, Rome

The Dying Gaul, also called The Dying Galatian (Italian: Galata morente) or The Dying Gladiator, is an ancient Roman marble semi-recumbent statue now in the Capitoline Museums in Rome. It is a copy of a now lost Greek sculpture from the Hellenistic period (323–31 BC) thought to have been made in bronze. The original may have been commissioned at some time between 230 and 220 BC by Attalus I of Pergamon to celebrate his victory over the Galatians, the Celtic or Gaulish people of parts of Anatolia. The original sculptor is believed to have been Epigonus, a court sculptor of the Attalid dynasty of Pergamon. The marble copy in Rome is thought to date from the 1st or 2nd century AD.

Until the 20th century, the marble statue was usually known as The Dying Gladiator, on the assumption that it depicted a wounded gladiator in a Roman amphitheatre. It was first identified as a "barbarian" by Ennio Quirino Visconti based on the figure's neck torc, matted hair, bushy moustache, distinctive eyebrows, and wide nose. In the mid-19th century it was identified as a Gaul or Galatian and the present name "Dying Gaul" gradually achieved popular acceptance.

== History ==
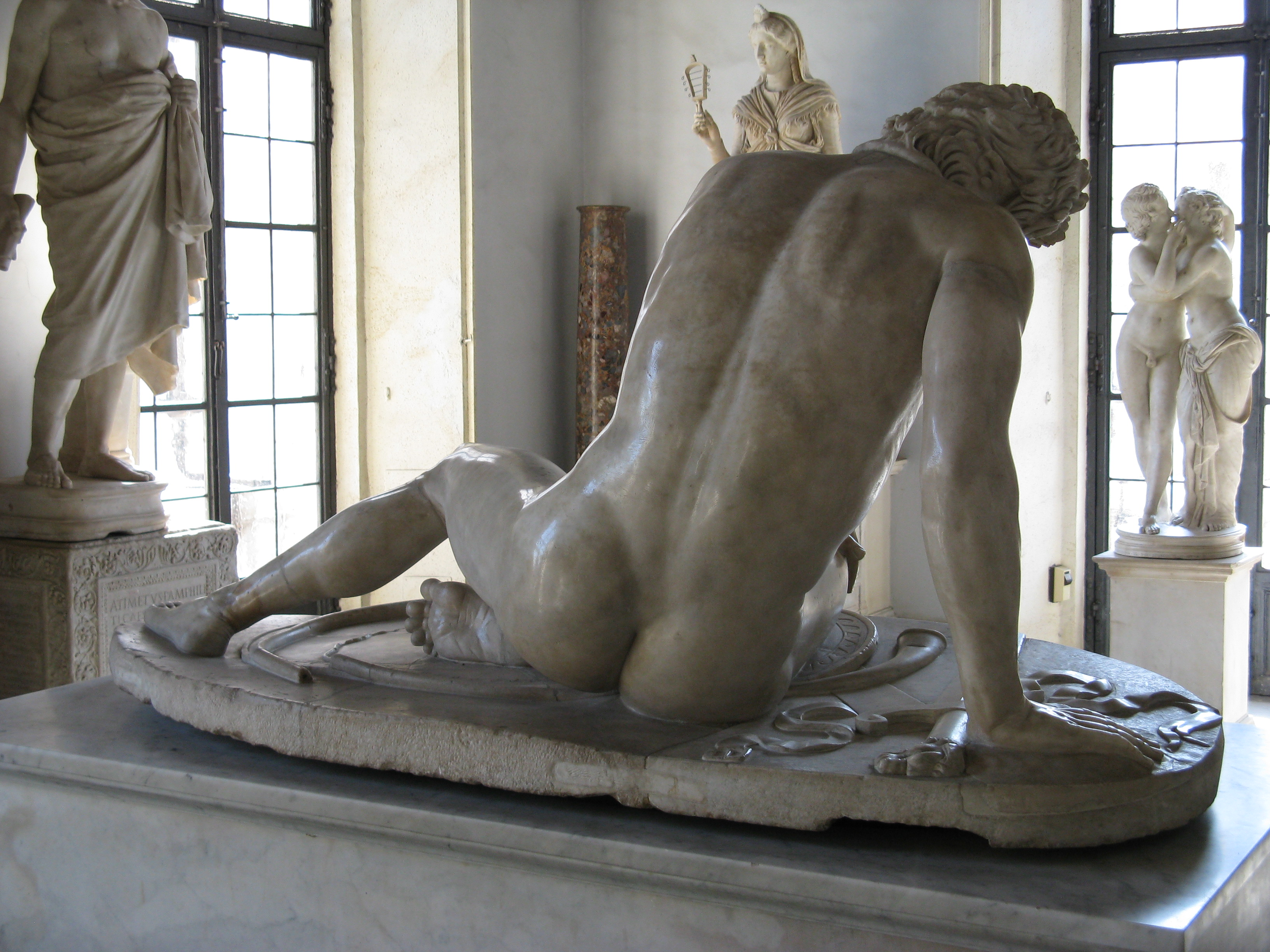
Back of the sculpture.

The Dying Gaul was first recorded in a 1623 inventory of the collections of the Ludovisi family. The 16th-century Ludovisi inventories do not mention the so-called Ludovisi barbarians, thus it is likely that the Ludovisi acquired them early in the 17th century, during excavations for the building of the Villa Ludovisi commissioned by Cardinal Ludovico Ludovisi on the site of the Roman Gardens of Sallust (Latin: Horti Sallustiani). It is very likely that the barbarian figures came from these gardens. Many other antiquities (most notably the "Ludovisi Throne") were subsequently discovered on the site in the late 19th century when the Ludovisi estate was redeveloped and built over.

When the first inventory was made, the Ludovisi antiquities had already been restored, apparently by the sculptor Ippolito Buzzi in 1623 with the assistance of the young sculptor and painter, Gian Lorenzo Bernini. Those restorations that are not Bernini's are believed to be Buzzi's according to Miranda Marvin, an archaeologist and a scholar of art and classics. Conjectures on the date of the carving of the Dying Gaul and the Gaul Killing Himself and His Wife, the Ludovisi barbarians, range from ca. 48-46 BC to ca. AD 100. Kimberly Cassibry writes that the majority of scholars believe they are faithful copies of statues erected by the Attalids at Pergamon (or possibly Delphi), while others consider them original creations in the "Grand Manner" of that dynasty's artistic style.

In 1670, Giambattista Ludovisi considered selling the Dying Gladiator (Gladiatore morente), as it was known then, valuing it at 70,000 scudi, almost twice as much as the value of any other single figure in his collection. The sculpture was displayed in the Palazzo Grande of the Villa Ludovisi until it was seized in about 1688–1689 by Livio Odescalchi, the Duke of Bracciano, as payment of a debt, returned, and again seized by Odescalchi in 1695. It was finally returned to the last surviving Ludovisi, Ippolita Boncompagni, in 1715 or 1716.

In the early 1730s Pope Clement XII (ruled 1730–1740) gave large sums of money to the Marquis Capponi to acquire ancient Roman sculpture and other antiquities, thereby establishing the Capitoline Museum. Capponi, its first director, soon began adding more objects to its collections. Upon the death of Ippolita Ludovisi in December 1733, he began negotiations with the legal representative of her heirs, Cardinal Troiano Acquaviva, for the acquisition of the Dying Gladiator. The sculptor Agostino Cornacchini set the starting price at 12,000 scudi, but this amount was subsequently reduced to 6,000 scudi. It was later taken by Napoleon's forces in 1797 under the terms of the Treaty of Tolentino, and reached Paris in the triumphal procession of July 1798 celebrating Bonaparte's Italian campaign, following which it was displayed with other Italian works of art in the Musée Central des Arts with its inauguration on 9 November 1800. The statue remained in Paris until October 1815 when it was repatriated following the intervention of the sculptor Antonio Canova (1757-1822). It arrived in Rome in the first half of 1816, and was returned to the Capitoline Museum later that year. The Dying Gaul now sits in the gallery at the top of the stairs of the Capitoline Museum, where it was placed in 1733.

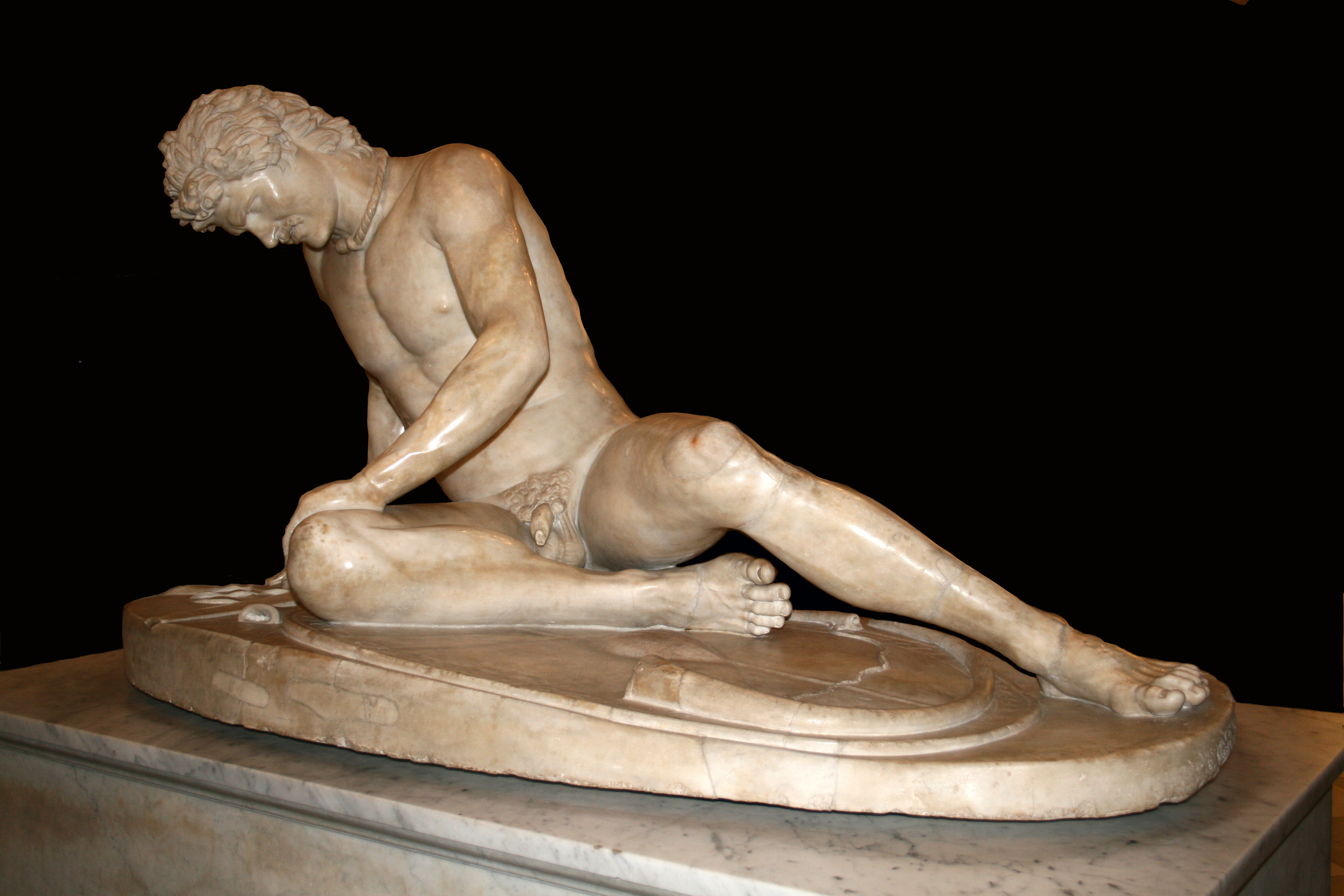
Different view

Marvin says the Ludovisi pieces are considered to date to the 2nd century A.D. by most specialists in Roman sculpture, but that the archaeologist Filippo Coarelli, an expert in Roman antiquities, regards them as dating to the 1st century B.C, and Beatrice Palma follows this in her 1985 catalogue of the Ludovisi sculptures in the Museo Nazionale Romano. Marvin proposes that the Ludovisi barbarians are not necessarily Gauls, that they represent Hellenistic stereotypes of Celts perpetuated by the Greeks and inherited by the Romans, and they are not literal illustrations of a specific ethnicity. These stereotypes survived into late antiquity virtually unchanged, even though by then the Romans were encountering actual barbarians more often. The Greeks conceived of the barbarian as "other", a conception the Romans used more loosely, but never completely shed.

Donato Attanasio, a chemist and spectroscopist, conducted an analysis of a sample of the Dying Gaul statue to determine the provenance of the marble. He says scholars still disagree on many important matters regarding the Ludovisi and Capitoline Gauls and other replicas, such as their dating, details of their appearance, the chronology of the Roman copies, and whether or not the statues are exact copies or eclectic Roman interpretations of the Pergamene prototypes.

Marvin has reviewed the historiographic scholarship on the Ludovisi barbarians, long believed to be marble copies of the bronze originals from Attalid Pergamon. She concludes that arguments for their being mere copies of the presumed second-century B.C. Pergamene originals are "deeply flawed" regarding the identity of their subjects, details about their context, reconstruction, and date. Marvin advances the hypothesis, rather, that the sculptures are second century A.D. Roman creations in the grand manner associated with the art of Hellenistic Pergamon, which was widely emulated around the Mediterranean in both Hellenistic and Roman times.

This view is rejected by Massimiliano Papini, a specialist in Greek and Roman sculpture, who dismisses as "improbable" the "attempts to attribute the original bronzes of defeated Gauls reflected in the large-scale copies to Attalos I's terrace at Delphi, and even more the interpretation of the marble pieces as Roman works evoking Pergamon 'in the grand manner'".

=== Restoration and conservation ===
Copy in the gardens of Villa Giulia, Bellagio

Emma Payne cites research by the conservator Giovanna Martellotti and her colleagues suggesting that years after Ippolito Buzzi's comparatively light-touch restoration, the Dying Gaul underwent a major restoration, possibly as a result of the earlier composition suffering breakage, specifically the right arm. The researchers believe that in the original Roman composition and in the Buzzi restoration, the arm was positioned closer to the body and at a steeper angle, as if the man were falling to the ground. In the academic literature, the newer restoration has been observed for many years to be incorrect.

Martellotti says the Dying Gaul is generally believed to be a 2nd-century AD Roman copy of a Hellenistic work, the original dating from the end of the 3rd century or the beginning of the 2nd century BC. When first excavated, it was found broken into several pieces, and had experienced other significant damage. In a paper delivered to a symposium held at the J. Paul Getty Museum in 2001, Martellotti summarizes the statue's careful restoration, including the extensive reconstruction ascribed to the Lombard sculptor Ippolito Buzzi, who worked from 1621 to 1625 on restoring the Ludovisi collection:

She considers the reconstruction of the right arm as the feature of the figure most decisive for its interpretation by the conservators, and describes the arm, carved in white marble like Buzzi's other inserts, as a very fine work on its own merits that was long credited to Michelangelo. The lengths of the upper and lower parts of the arm are slightly disproportionate; the entire arm is 3–5 cm (1.181–1.969 in) shorter than the left arm. Martellotti says the conservators' close examination led them to believe that the sculpture had been subjected to a later procedure in which the 17th-century arm was severed at its upper join and then reattached. This is indicated partly by an empty hole for a pin in the figure's trunk and a small variation in height between the arm and the original marble of the shoulder at their joining, which only became apparent after a doubtlessly recent plaster filling was removed.

Martellotti points out inconsistencies in the manner that the right hand is inserted into the base, saying that the thumb is broken and has been reattached several times, and the surface at the join between the two parts of the base has been recarved with a chisel. The straight edge of the base to which the hand is attached bisects the hilt of the sword and continues beneath the thumb. She notes that the remainder of the reconstructed base to which the hand has been attached is a veined grey marble that is not polished, unlike the rest of the sculpture, and its surface features are crudely worked.

As recounted in her presentation, the conservators' examination showed that Buzzi had also reassembled the three fragments of the left leg by pinning the pieces together. The calf was a separate piece, but the foot and knee were attached to two different fragments of the base, which he joined together by removing a piece from the knee and inserting a pin from the knee into the leg. After removing this marble insert that restores the knee, the team found the head of the pin, set in lead. They also discovered that aside from joining the broken parts with clamps and pins, Buzzi had performed other restoration work to give the sculpture visual integrity. He made marble inserts to hide clamps or restore missing parts, reworked the stone in several places, and reattached loosened flakes and other fragments of stone. Martellotti says it is obvious that the marble has been polished at some point in its history, and almost all traces of the original working of the surface have been obliterated. It is uncertain whether the surface now seen is due to Buzzi's treatment or to the later polishing of the entire Ludovisi collection directed by Alessandro Algardi.

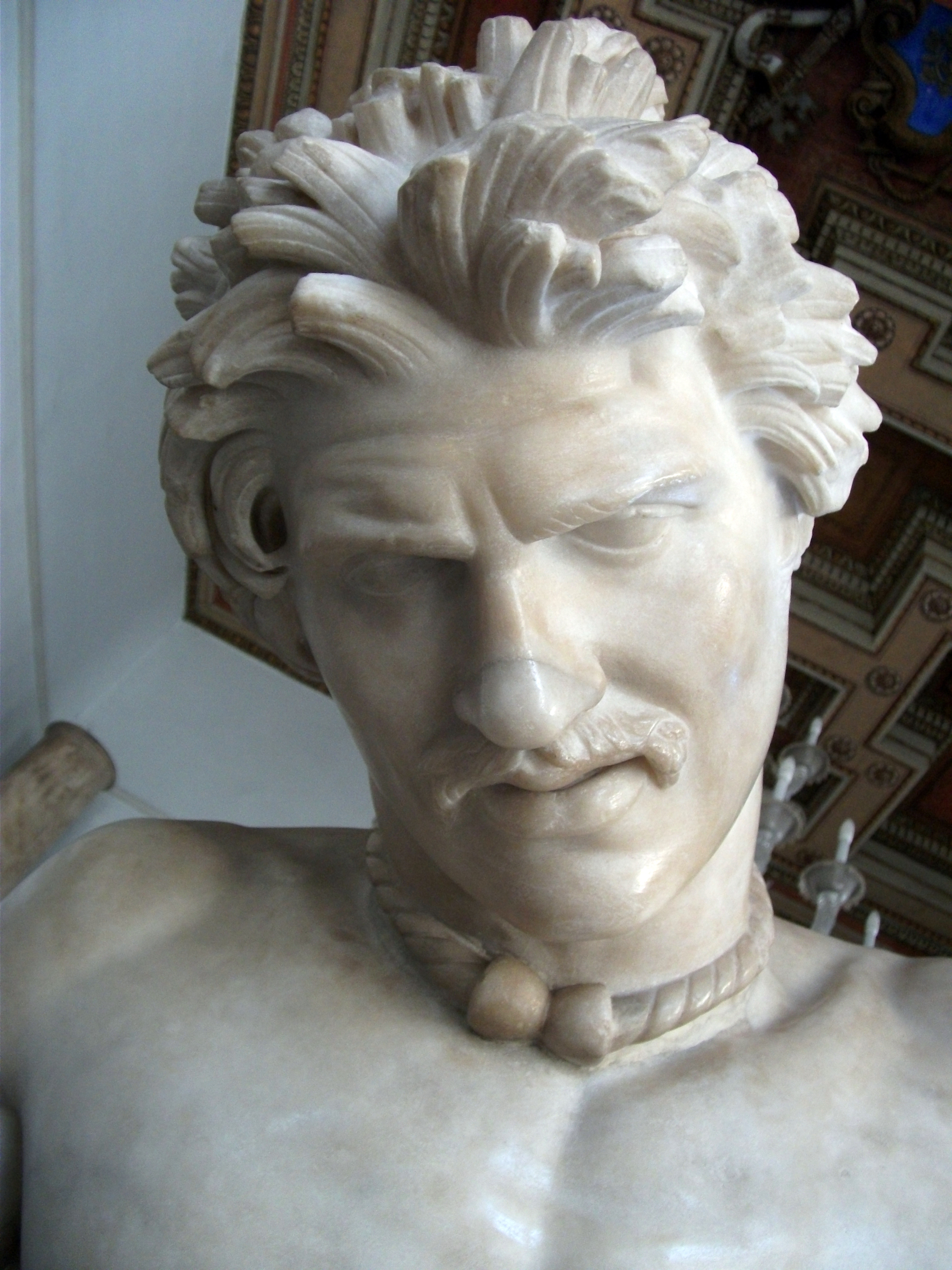
Detail showing the face, hairstyle and torc of the sculpture

The head of the Dying Gaul is broken at the neck, and according to Kim Hartswick, it appears to have been repaired in the Roman period. This is indicated by a pour channel (used for pouring molten lead) of ancient form, preserved at the back near a much larger, U-shaped hole made in the course of the repairs carried out in the 17th century. The head is attached to the neck exactly below the torque necklace—the break as it appears now is too regular to be natural and too irregular to be a joining surface worked for the purpose—leading Marina Mattei and other scholars to hypothesize that the break is natural and was either fixed in a Roman restoration or more likely during the 17h-century repairs. Thus, the present attachment and positioning of the head must be slightly altered from the original configuration.

Almost all the originally long locks of the Dying Gaul's hair have been broken over the years, and its appearance today is a result of the remaining stubs having been reworked. Katherine Schwab and Marice Rose write that Greek society was keenly observant of non-Greek peoples, and hair style was an identifying characteristic of foreigners. The carved hair of the Dying Gaul is distinctive: "thick tufts project outward from the scalp now with tips cut off". He has no beard and his only facial hair is a moustache, which Schwab and Rose say is a combination unknown in Greek art.

From December 12, 2013, until March 16, 2014, the work was on display in the main rotunda of the west wing of the National Gallery of Art in Washington D.C. This temporary tenure marked the first time the statue had left Italy since it was returned in the second decade of the 19th century.

== Provenance ==
According to Attanasio et al, their provenance analysis proves that the marble used in the Dying Gaul is white Docimian marble. These marbles are extremely difficult to distinguish from Göktepe white marbles visually, some of which are also analytically very similar to the Docimian marbles, especially those Göktepe marbles originating from the so-called district 4 quarries. The researchers report that the results of their strontium analysis in comparing marble samples from Göktepe with the statues of the Ludovisi Gauls indicated "uncommonly high" strontium levels in Göktepe marbles, and much lower levels in those from Docimium, ruling out any possible provenance from the Göktepe quarries. They say mathematical analysis of their data confirms that the Dying Gaul is made of white Docimian marble originating from Afyon, probably from one of the Roman imperial quarries.

== Portrayal of Celts ==
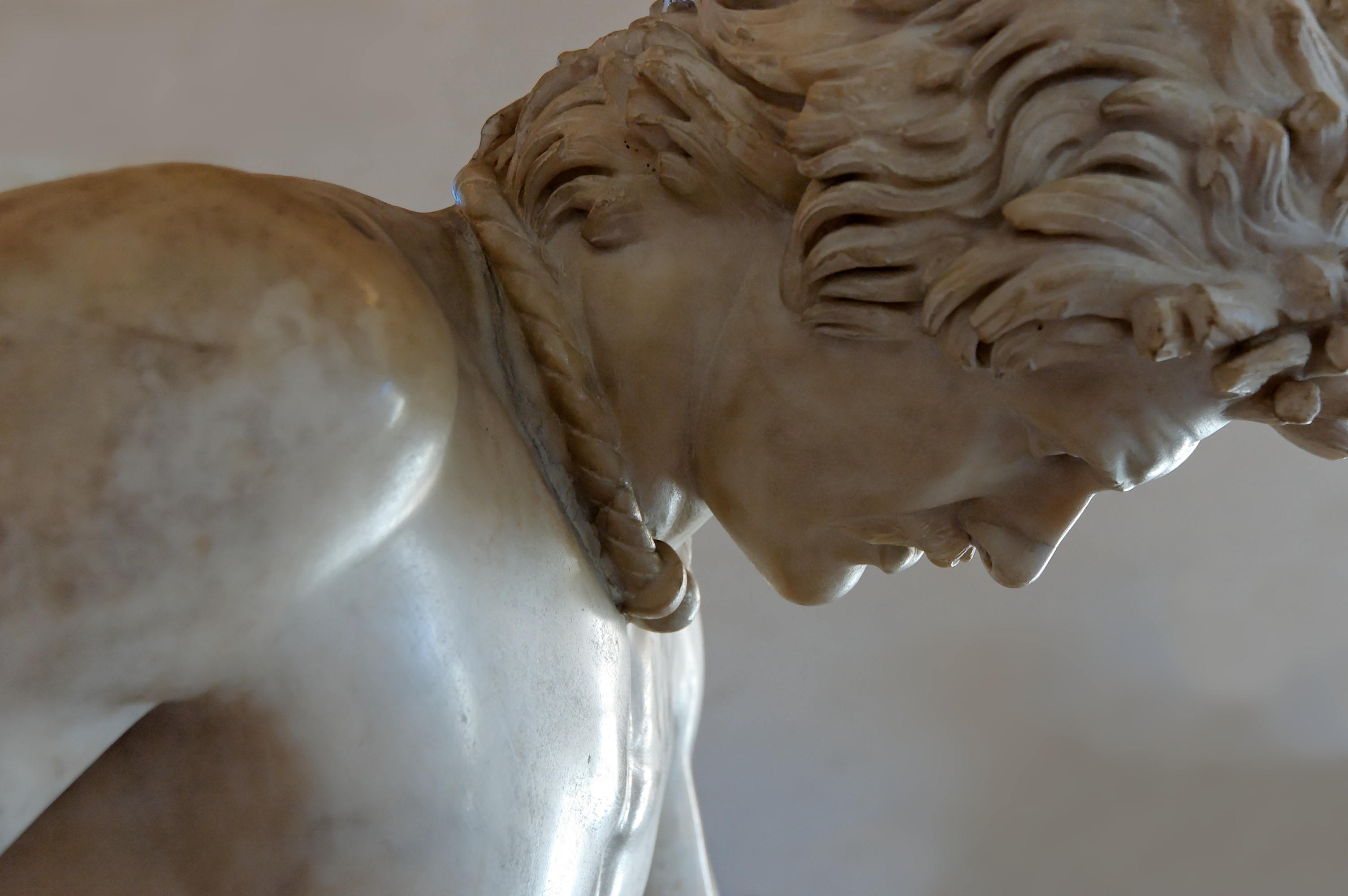
Detail showing his neck torc.

The statue serves both as a reminder of the Celts' defeat, thus demonstrating the might of the people who defeated them, and a memorial to their bravery as worthy adversaries. The statue may also provide evidence to corroborate ancient accounts of the fighting style—Diodorus Siculus reported that "Some of them have iron breastplates or chainmail while others fight naked". Polybius wrote an evocative account of Galatian tactics against a Roman army at the Battle of Telamon of 225 BC:

The Insubres and the Boii wore trousers and light cloaks, but the Gaesatae, in their love of glory and defiant spirit, had thrown off their garments and taken up their position in front of the whole army naked and wearing nothing but their arms... The appearance of these naked warriors was a terrifying spectacle, for they were all men of splendid physique and in the prime of life.—Polybius, Histories II.28

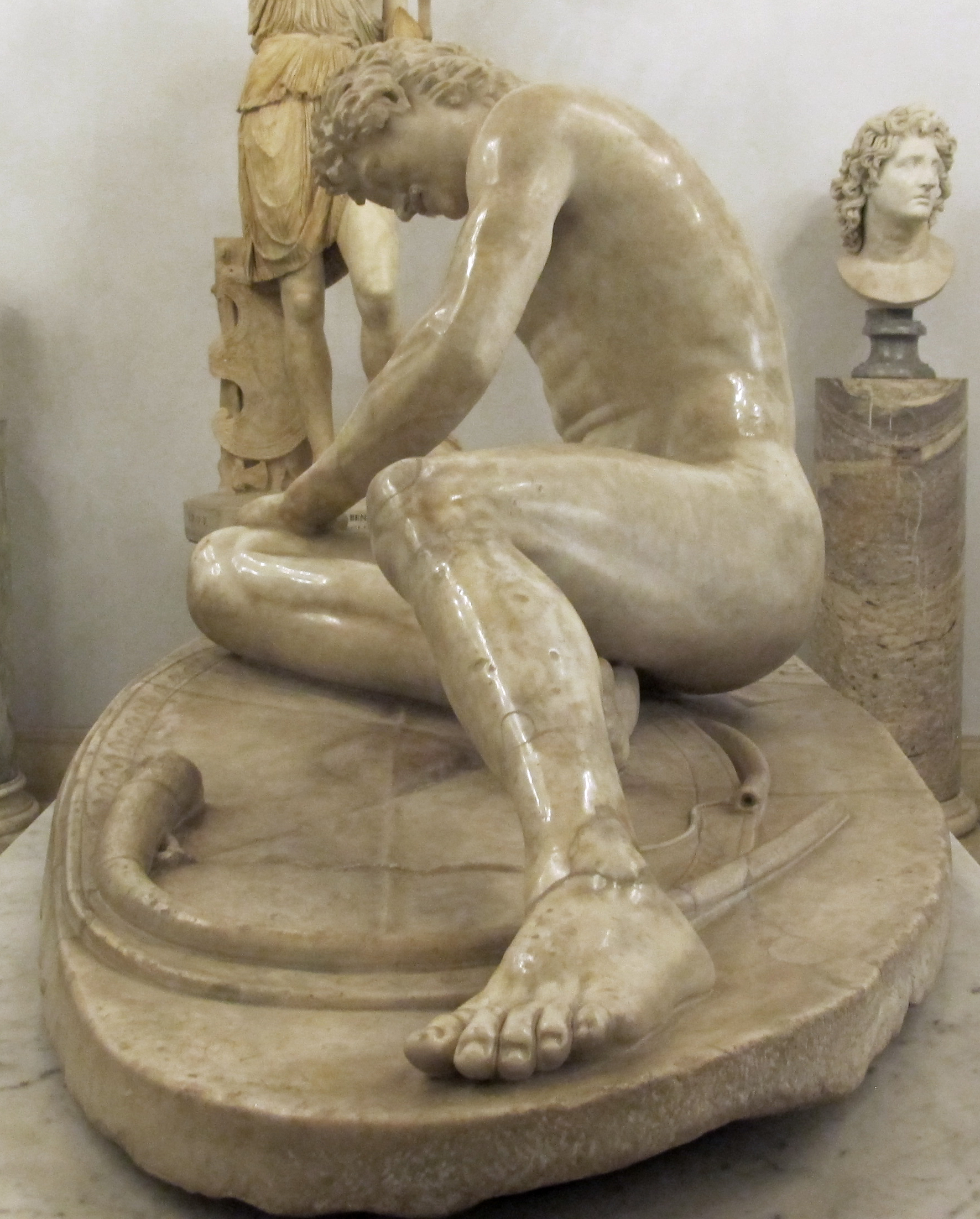
Sideview of the dying trumpeter

The Roman historian Livy recorded that the Celts of Asia Minor fought naked and their wounds were plain to see on the whiteness of their bodies. The Greek historian Dionysius of Halicarnassus regarded this as a foolish tactic:

Our enemies fight naked. What injury could their long hair, their fierce looks, their clashing arms do us? These are mere symbols of barbarian boastfulness.

— Dionysius of Halicarnassus, History of Rome XIV.9

The depiction of this particular Galatian as naked may also have been intended to lend him the dignity of heroic nudity or pathetic nudity. It was not infrequent for Greek warriors to be likewise depicted as heroic nudes, as exemplified by the pedimental sculptures of the Temple of Aphaea at Aegina. The message conveyed by the sculpture, as H. W. Janson comments, is that "They knew how to die, barbarians though they were".

== Influence ==
The Dying Galatian became one of the most celebrated works to have survived from antiquity and was first engraved by François Perrier in his work Segmenta nobilium signorum et statuarum que temporis dentem invidium evase (Rome and Paris 1638, plate 91). The statue was endlessly copied by artists, for whom it was a classic model for depiction of strong emotion, and by sculptors.

During this period, the statue was widely interpreted as representing a defeated gladiator, rather than a Galatian warrior. Hence it was known as the "Dying" or "Wounded Gladiator", "Roman Gladiator", and "Murmillo Dying". It has also been called the "Dying Trumpeter" because one of the scattered objects lying beside the figure is a horn, which is broken. According to the classicist Nigel Spivey, it is a curved war-trumpet, the cornu.

The artistic quality and expressive pathos of the statue aroused great admiration among the educated classes in the 17th and 18th centuries and was a "must-see" sight on the Grand Tour of Europe undertaken by young men of the day. Byron was one such visitor, commemorating the statue in his poem Childe Harold's Pilgrimage:

I see before me the Gladiator lie

He leans upon his hand—his manly brow
Consents to death, but conquers agony,
And his drooped head sinks gradually low—
And through his side, the last drops, ebbing slow

From the red gash, fall heavy, one by one...

== Reproductions and copies ==
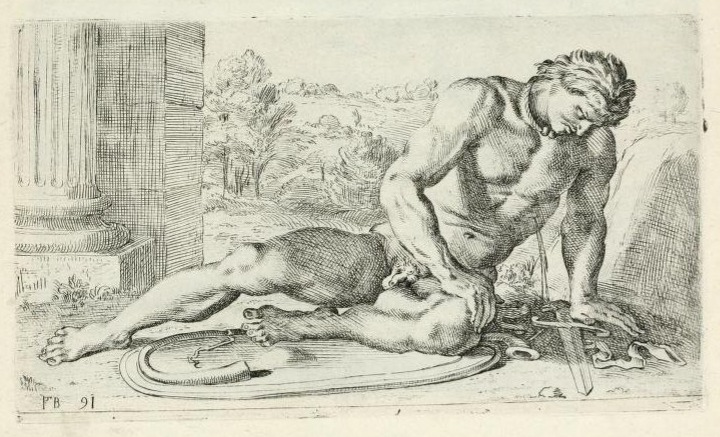
Engraving by François Perrier of the Dying Gladiator statue in the Capitoline Museums of Rome

According to the art historian Francis Haskell, an engraving of the Dying Gladiator was published in François Perrier's 1638 folio of engravings of Rome's "finest sculptures", marking the first of innumerable times it has been reproduced. The first known copy is the plaster cast made for Philip IV of Spain in 1650. Another cast was made for the French Academy in Rome, and no later than 1684 Michel Monnier in Rome carved a marble copy for Louis XIV that was sent to France, where it remains at Versailles. In 1743 Peter Scheemakers sculpted a version in stone for the garden at Rousham House in Oxfordshire—his rendering was judged by Haskell to be badly done. Simon Vierpyl carved a version in marble for Wilton House, the earl of Pembroke's Wiltshire country house, before 1769. Another was cast in bronze by Luigi Valadier for the great hall of Syon House, the Duke of Northumberland's mansion, in 1773.

Haskell and Nicholas Penny say that the diarist John Evelyn travelled in Italy during the years 1644–1645 and when writing up his travel notes many years later, claimed that copies and statues made by artists following the Dying Gladiator were dispersed throughout all of Europe. Small bronzes were made in the 17th and 18th centuries, and Thomas Jefferson wanted a copy of the Gladiator for his proposed library at Monticello.

In 1776, the body of a hanged smuggler who had been dissected by the anatomist William Hunter for the Royal Academy of Arts teaching schools was cast by Agostino Carlini in the same pose as that of the Dying Gladiator.
