= Ludovisi Gaul =

Sculpture by Epigonus of Pergamum

- The Galatian Suicide
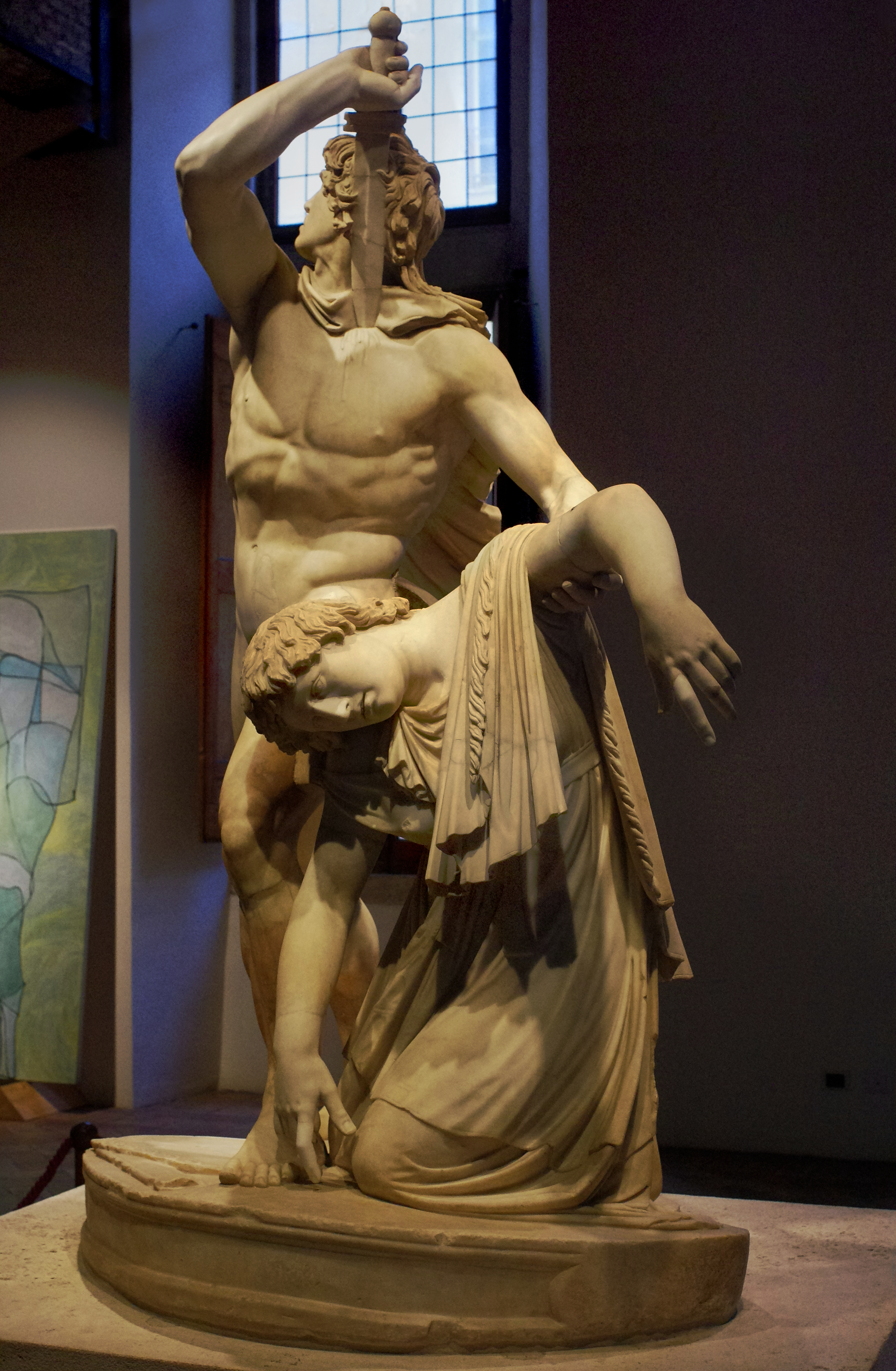
- Artist: Epigonus
- Year: 2nd century AD
- Medium: Marble copy
- Dimensions: 2.11 m (83 in)
- Location: National Roman Museum – Palazzo Altemps, Rome
- Accession: Inv. 8608

The Ludovisi Gaul (sometimes called "The Galatian Suicide") is an ancient Roman statue depicting a Gallic man plunging a sword into his breast as he holds up the dead body of his wife. This sculpture is a marble copy of a now-lost Greek bronze original. The Ludovisi Gaul is on display in the Palazzo Altemps in Rome. This statue is unique for its time because it was common to depict the victor but instead, the Ludovisi Gaul depicts the defeated.

== Description ==
The statue depicts a Gaulish man or Galatian Celt who has just killed his wife and is holding her lifeless body in one arm and a sword in another which he is about to use to kill himself. It is believed to depict a chieftain who has killed his wife and is killing himself to prevent them both from being captured.

The sculpture is considered a good example of Hellenistic art because of its dramatic characteristics. The postures of the characters are exaggerated and their bodies contort in every way. Each limb is spread out in different directions, which gives the feeling that the figures are coming to life. The statue is dramatic in many ways and represents what is known as Hellenistic Baroque art. Hellenistic sculptures incorporated three main characteristics in their work to create a more lifelike aesthetic: expressive movement, realistic anatomy and ornate detail.

The fluid motion of the bodies can be seen in how the man's arm flows in a serpentine motion into the woman's arm.

When viewing this sculpture from the front, the man's face is only visible in profile. If the viewers move to the side of the statue, they can see his face but no longer the sword. There is blood dripping from where the sword meets his chest. The dramatic posture of the bodies and spread limbs are very commonly found in Hellenistic art.

== History ==
The Ludovisi Gaul is a Roman copy of the early second century AD, of a Hellenistic original, ca 230–20 BC. The original bronzes may have been commissioned by Attalus I of Pergamon to celebrate his victory over the Galatians, the Celtic or Gaulish people of parts of Anatolia. A court sculptor of the Attalid dynasty of Pergamon named Epigonus is believed to be the original sculptor of the pieces. Other Roman marble copies from the same project are the equally famous Dying Gaul, and the less well-known Kneeling Gaul. It is believed that these sculptures were meant to be shown together along with others to create a monument. This group of statues was believed to be displayed in Pergamon, which used to be an important capital in the Greek Hellenistic world (323–31 BCE) close to the coast of modern-day Turkey.

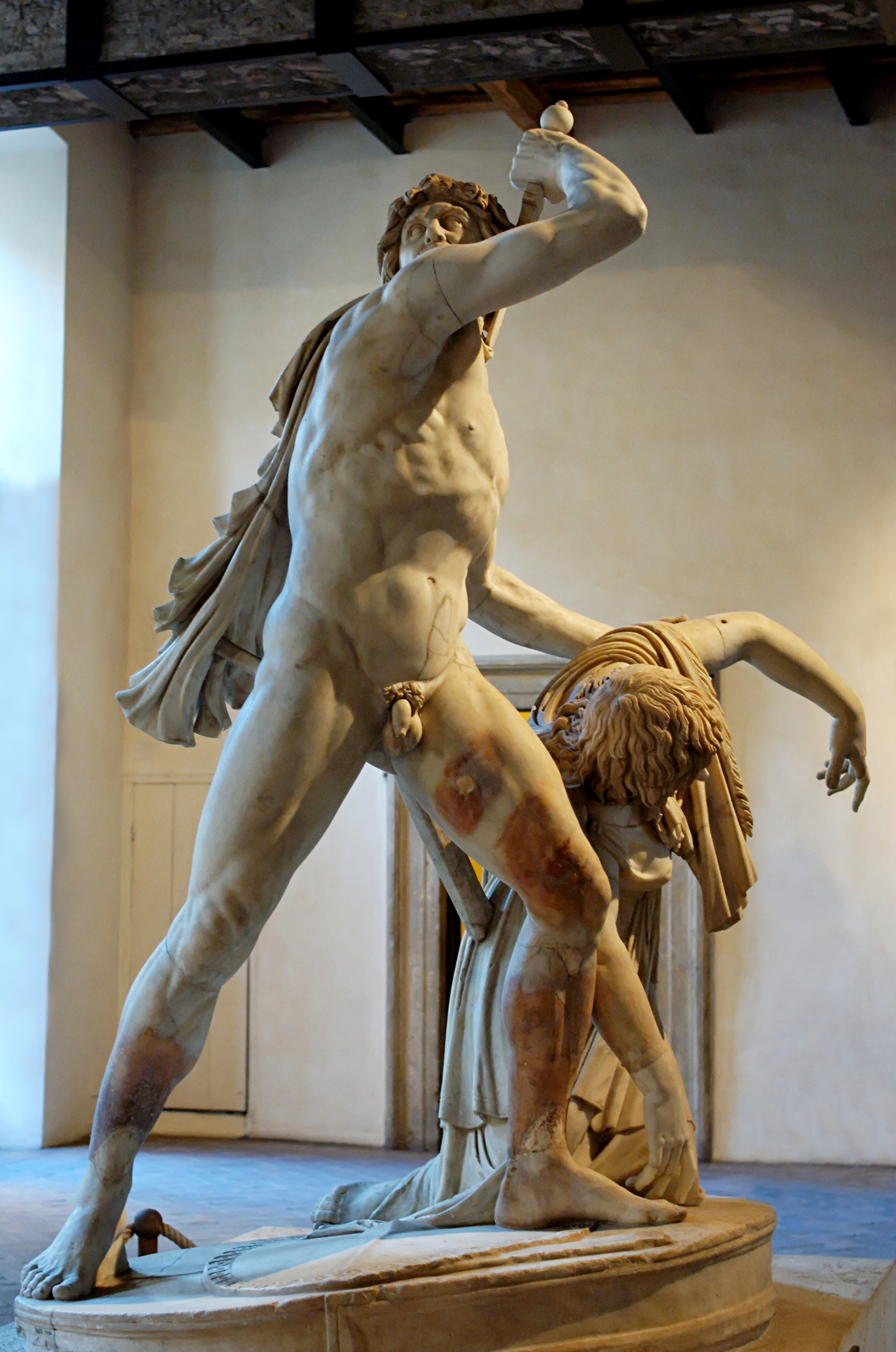

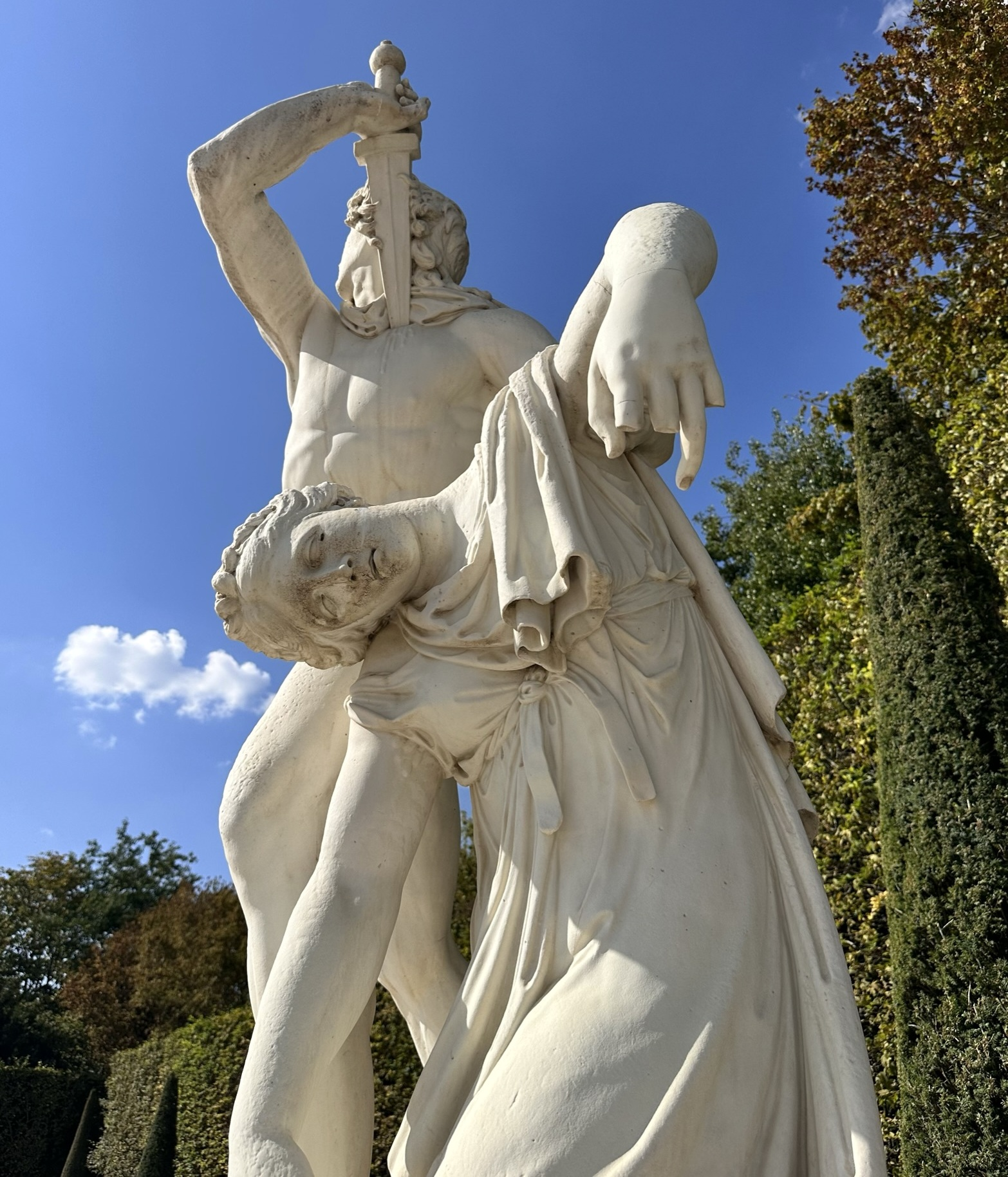
Ludovisi Gaul in the Gardens of Versailles

=== Monument Base ===
An argument regarding where the originals were placed at Pergamon started in the mid-twentieth century. Massimiliano Papini believes that the statues were placed on a circular pedestal with the Ludovisi Gaul as the centerpiece. Others argue that the sculptures were lined up on a rectangular base. Both arguments are weak due to the scarce and ambiguous archaeological evidence.

The theory that these larger than lifesize statues were placed on a rectangle pedestal created by Epigonos is favored. It is thought that about eighteen statues belonged on the base of the monument but unfortunately only two of them remain. There are existing fragments of the head of the Dying Persian and also the Dying Barbarian Women in the Museo Palatino in Rome that may also be a part of this sculpture group.

A circular pedestal would have been rare for its time. Although there is an example of one used at Miletos/Miletus to support a gilded statue of Eumenes II dedicated to the ruler in 167-166 B.C.

=== Provenance ===
After being lost for many years, the statue was rediscovered in the early 17th century. During excavations for the building of Villa Ludovisi, the sculpture was found along with The Dying Gaul. Years later when the villa was redeveloped, more antiquities were found such as the Ludovisi Throne. The sculpture group made its first appearance in a Ludovisi inventory taken 2 February 1623, and was possibly found in the grounds of the Villa Ludovisi, Rome, shortly before that. The area had been part of the Gardens of Sallust (formerly owned by Julius Caesar) in Classical times, and proved a rich source of Roman (and some Greek) sculpture through the 19th century (Haskell and Penny, 282). Among the last of the finds at Villa Ludovisi, before the area was built over, was the Ludovisi Throne.

The sculpture, in the Museo Nazionale di Roma, Palazzo Altemps, Rome, was greatly admired from the 17th century. It appeared in engravings in therepertory of sculpture in Rome by Perrier and was codified by Audran as one of the sculptures of Antiquity that defined the canon of fine proportions of the human body. Nicolas Poussin adapted the figure for the group in the right foreground of his Rape of the Sabine Women at the Metropolitan Museum of Art (Friedlaender 19 and fig. 108). Visitors and writers of guidebooks found many subjects drawn from Roman history to account for the action: the 1633 Ludovisi inventory lists it as "a certain Marius who kills his daughter and himself", drawing upon the story of a certain patrician Sextus Marius, who in seeking to protect his daughter from the lust of Tiberius, was accused of incest with her.

Giovanni Francesco Susini rendered the group in a small bronze. The marble was copied by François Lespingola for Louis XIV and may still be seen paired with the Laocoön at the entrance to the Tapis Vert at Versailles; the cast prepared in preparation for the copy was retained at the French Academy in Rome (where it remains). The Ludovisi heirs prohibited further casts, but in 1816–19 Prince Luigi Boncompagni Ludovisi sent plaster casts to the Prince Regent; the Grand Duke of Tuscany, Prince Metternich; and the diplomat at the Congress of Vienna, Wilhelm von Humboldt (Haskell and Penny 284).

== Subject ==
It was common for victory statues to display the triumphant but instead in this piece we see a sympathetic portrait of the defeated. This man is believed to represent a chieftain who is killing himself and his wife so that they would not be captured and taken as prisoners. It was also typical that the Gauls would bring their wives to battle with them. He is identifiable as a Gaul because of his thick wavy hair, and facial mustache.

=== History of the Celts ===
The expansion of the Celtic people (also known as the Galatians or the Gauls, as Romans called them, coming from their homelands in Central Europe in the south and east) was put on hold during the third century B.C. Their expansion in Balkans was brought to a halt in the winter of 279 B.C. by allies of the Greeks. The Greeks viewed the invaders as Barbarians who sought to attack Hellenic Liberty. The Gallic chief Brannos and his army had high hopes of taking the sanctuary of Apollo at Delphi after having successfully overwhelmed the Greeks in a battle in Thermopylae. Here in Delphi, the Gauls were driven away by what was believed to be supernatural and mythical events that took place. A great thunderstorm took place which was believed to be created by Apollo himself with the help of Artemis and Athena. After this event, the Greeks decorated Delphi with Gallic shields they obtained from the battle, built monuments, and statues of the gods to commemorate their victory. The Greeks believed that the Gaul's unprecedented brutality should not be forgotten and that the women and children of Kallion near Delphi which they murdered should be remembered and honored.

When discovered, the two statues (Ludovisi Gaul and Dying Gaul) were believed to depict gladiators. It wasn't until the nineteenth century that these statues were connected to the works of Pliny the Elder which celebrated the victories of Pergamon over the Gauls of Asia Minor and were reinterpreted as Celtic warriors.
