= François Lespingola =

French sculptor

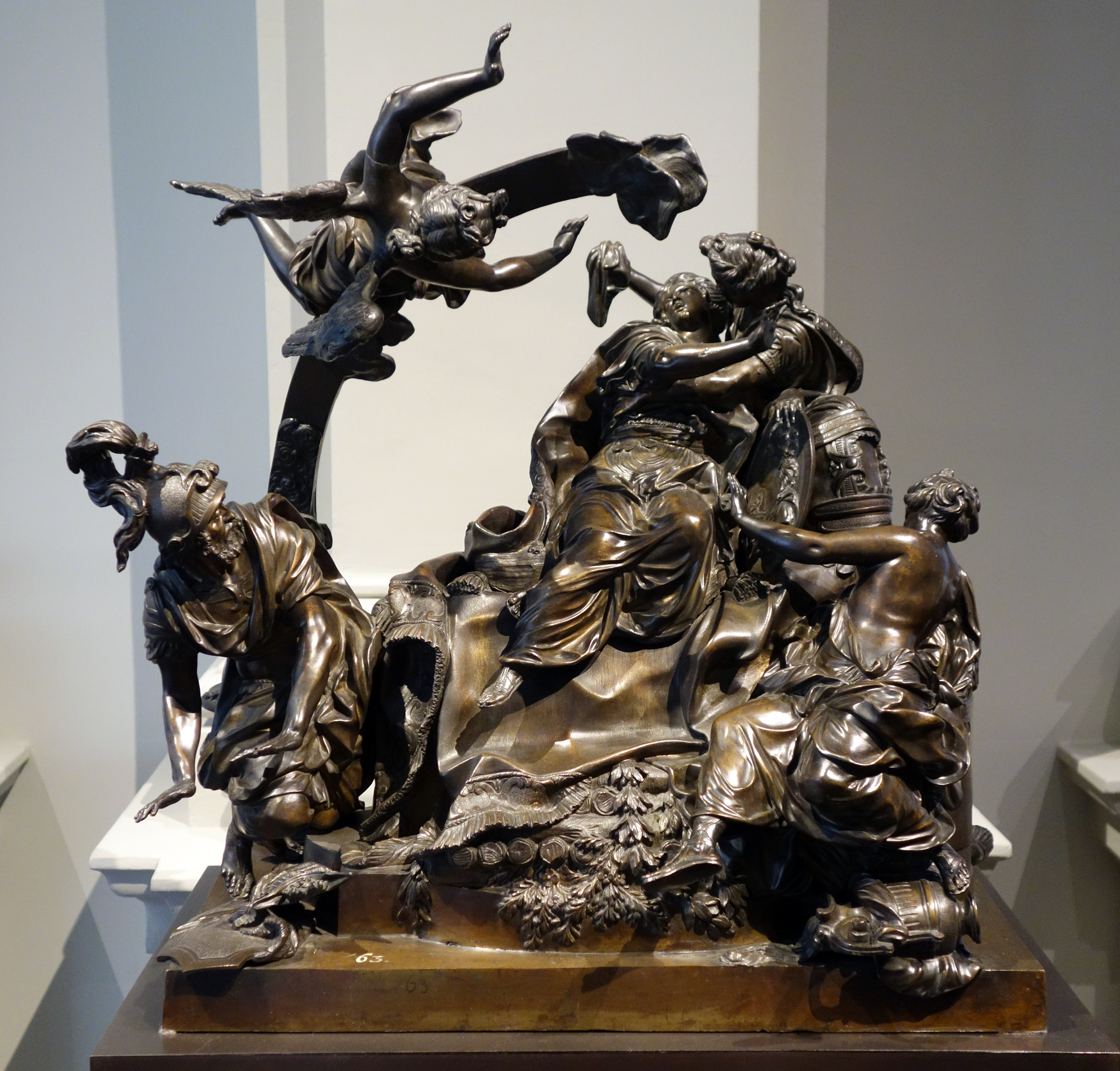
Dido on the Pyre (Staatliche Kunstsammlungen Dresden)

François Lespingola (Joinville, 1644 - Paris, 16 July 1705) was a French sculptor in the team that provided original sculptures, vases and copies after the Antique for the gardens at Versailles. From 1665 until 1675, Lespignola was a student in Rome at the Académie de France. In 1675, he became a member of the Accademia di San Luca. Once he returned to France, Lespingola was received as a member of the Académie royale de peinture et de sculpture in 1676.

His main employments were royal works at the Palace of Versailles and elsewhere. The Ludovisi Gaul, then known as Arrius and Paeta was copied by Lespingola in Rome in 1684 for Versailles: it still stands, paired with Laocoön, at the entrance to the Tapis Vert.

Lespignola also collaborated on a number of decorative works with Jacques Buirette (1631–99). These include models for trophies as well as the lively group of "Three Children Playing with a Swan" (1685–7).
