= Epigonus =

Hellenistic sculptor

Epigonus (Greek: Ἐπίγονος) of Pergamum was the chief among the court sculptors to the Attalid dynasty at Pergamum in the late third century BCE.

== Biography ==
Pliny the Elder, who offers the only surviving list of the sculptors of this influential Pergamene school, attributes to him works among the sculptures on the victory monument erected by Attalus I in the sanctuary of Athena at Pergamum to commemorate his victory over the Gauls of Galatia (223 BCE). Among works there by other sculptors, Pliny attributes to Epigonos a masterful Trumpeter and "his infant pitiably engaged in caressing its murdered mother"; the male figure in his group, once part of the dedication of Attalus I at Pergamon, is probably the original of the marble copy known in modern times as The Dying Gaul, in the Capitoline Museums, Rome. The Weeping Child pitifully caressing its murdered mother is "associated with the so-called Dead Amazon in Naples, a copy of a group which was once part of the later, second Gallic dedication of Attalos, at Athens.... From drawings of this composition made in the Renaissance, we learn that the child was removed from the Naples statue during the sixteenth century". Another sculpture from the same monument exists in marble copy of the Gaul Killing Himself and His Wife, formerly in the Ludovisi collection. Eight signed bases from the acropolis of Pergamon have lost their sculptures of valuable bronze, which was doubtless laboriously cut apart for the sake of the metal and refounded during Christian times.
