= Boston Throne =

Unusual marble sculpture

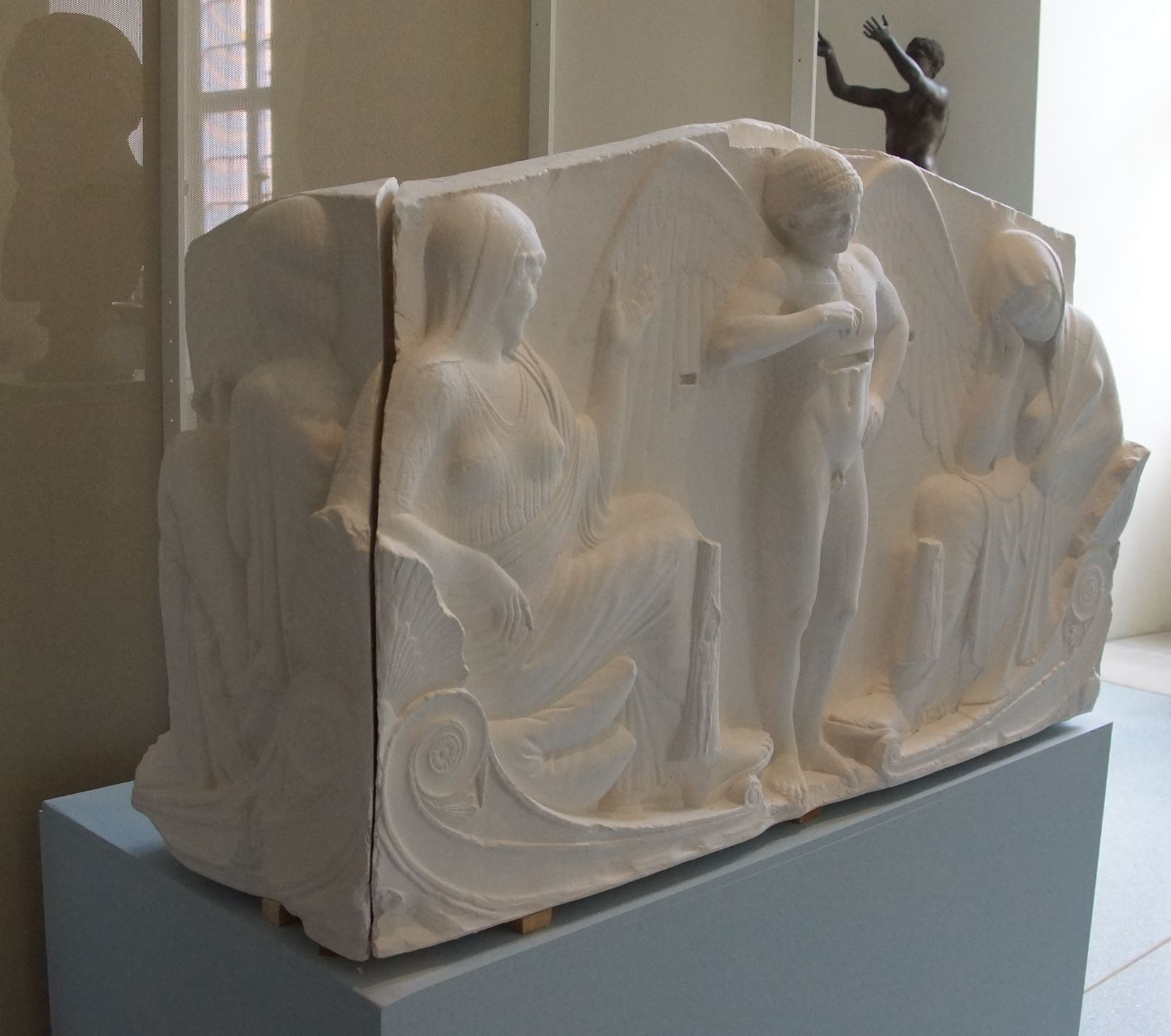
Unfinished plaster cast of the Boston Throne exhibited in Tübingen

The Boston Throne is an unusual marble sculpture, similar to the Ludovisi Throne. It probably dates from classical antiquity, and first appeared in modern times in 1894, shortly after the Ludovisi Throne was found and sold at auction. It was purchased by Edward Perry Warren for the Museum of Fine Arts, Boston in 1896.

== Description ==
The Boston Throne is a cuboid block of marble, carved in relief on three sides. The main panel on one long side shows a central naked winged youth, holding scales (mostly now lost). The pans of the scales remain, each containing the small figure of a youth. The central figure stands between two figures of women dressed in Ionian tunics and mantles, seated on palmettes and volute. The composition has been interpreted as a psychostasia (weighing of souls), and the figures have variously been identified as Eros, Persephone and Aphrodite, or Eros, Venus and Juno. The two shorter side panels also show figures: one, an old woman mourning; the other, a boy playing a lyre.

The consensus is that the sculpture of the Boston Throne is lower in quality than that of the Ludovisi Throne, with less subtle and less figurative characterisation. The Ludovisi Throne is thought to be a 5th-century BC Greek original, but it seems likely that the Boston Throne has a substantially later date; perhaps it was a 1st-century BC Roman companion-piece to the Ludovisi Throne, created for that piece's assumed display-arrangement in the Gardens of Sallust, or it may even be a forgery, possibly by Alceo Dossena.
