= Villa Giulia, Ventotene =

Roman imperial palace

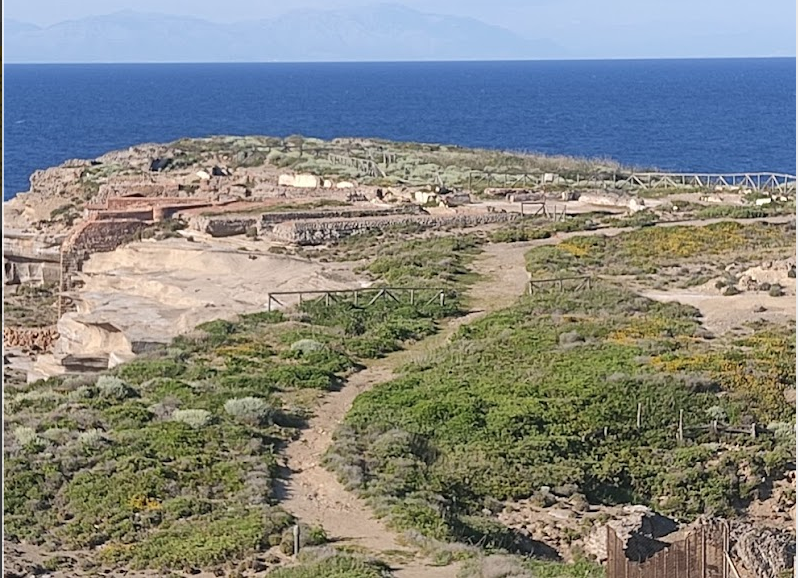
Baths of the Villa Giulia

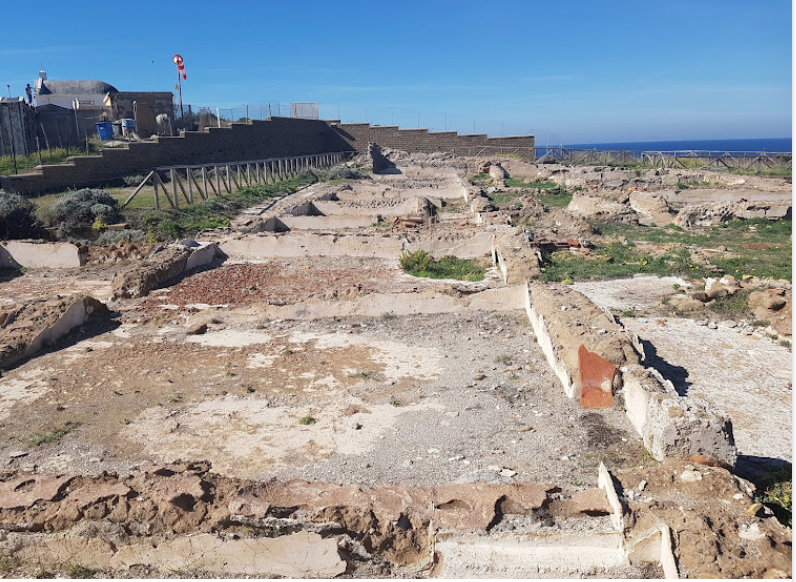
Domus farm area of Villa Giulia

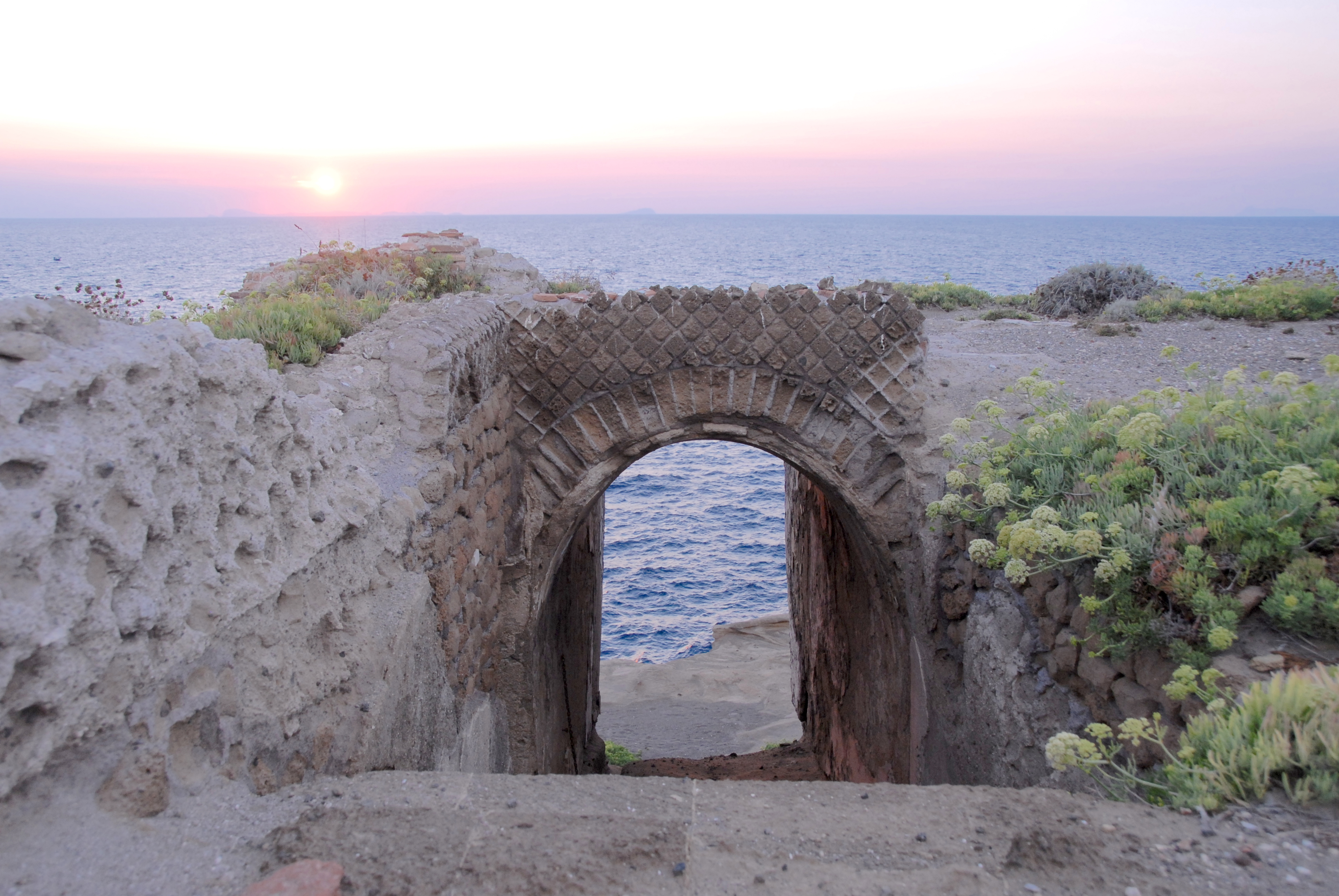
Baths sea gate and staircase

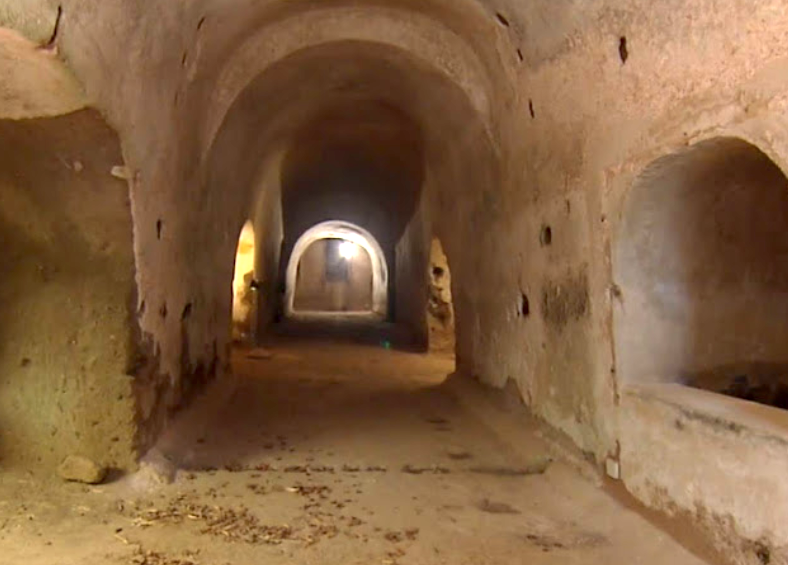
Cistern

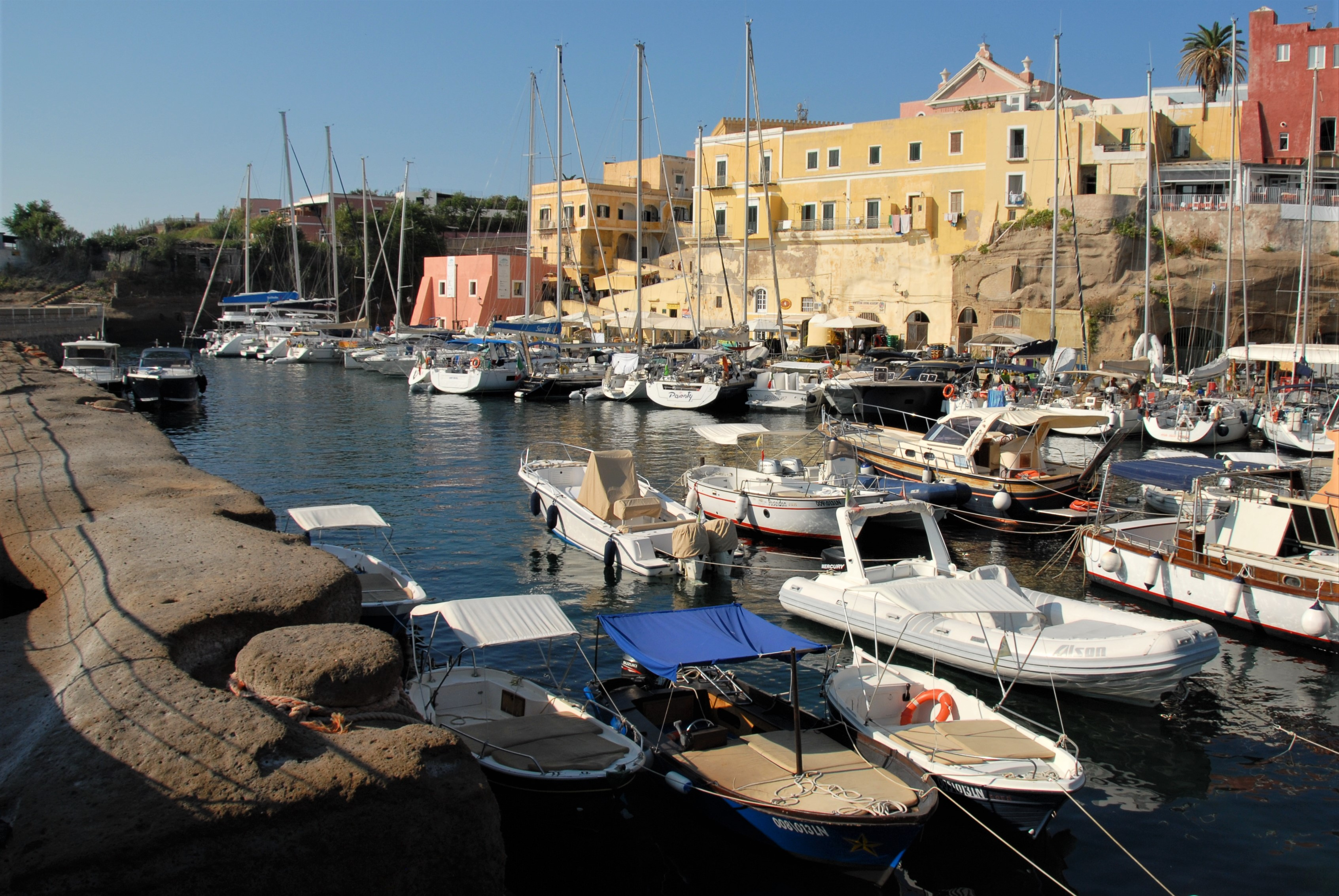
The Roman port of Ventotene with moorings on the left

Villa Giulia is an ancient Roman imperial villa or palace on the north tip of the island of Ventotene (ancient name: Pandateria) which lies between the Campania and Lazio regions of Italy.

The huge villa complex of over 3,000 m^{2} area included thermae (thermal baths), terraces, gardens, an exedra and aqueducts.

== History ==
Emperor Augustus had this villa built in the early part of his reign as a summer palace. Its maritime climate was pleasant and the land was flatter than nearby islands, making construction easier.

It became known as Villa Giulia as it was the place of exile of Augustus's daughter Julia the Elder in 2 BC, as a reaction to her excessive adultery. Ventotene, like all the Pontine Islands, was exclusively owned by the Emperor; he could therefore easily keep an eye on her. Augustus had two villas on the island; Julia was probably sent to the one located on the Punta d'Eolo, on the north of the island, with all the facilities of an imperial retreat.

Later, in 29 AD, emperor Tiberius banished Augustus' granddaughter Agrippina the Elder, who perished, probably of malnutrition, in 33 AD. After Agrippina the Elder's son Caligula became emperor in 37 AD, he went to Ventotene to collect her remains and reverently brought them back to Rome. Her youngest daughter, Julia Livilla, was exiled here twice: the first time by her brother Caligula for plotting to depose him, and the second time by her uncle, the emperor Claudius, at the instigation of his wife, Messalina, in 41 AD.

Sometime later, Julia Livilla was discreetly starved to death and her remains probably brought back to Rome when her older sister Agrippina the Younger became influential as Claudius' wife. Another distinguished lady of the Julio-Claudian dynasty, Claudia Octavia, who was the first wife of the emperor Nero, was banished to Ventotene in 62 AD and then executed on his orders.

This is also the island to where emperor Vespasian banished his granddaughter Flavia Domitilla.

Over the centuries, the villa has been subject to systematic plundering and senseless excavations that destroyed many of the walls. Extraction of tuff in tunnels on the shore caused edges of the villa above to collapse.

== The site ==
Ventotene has numerous remains of Roman buildings around the island; those of the ancient port near to the villa can be seen at Punto Eolo at the entrance to the modern port.

The villa occupied most of the peninsula of Punto Eolo, extending over an area of 300x100 m. The urban complex included the Imperial villa, the port, the fishery and water cisterns. The villa itself had three main sectors:

- the so-called domus, which was a farm area
- the central garden that linked the domus to the villa through a scenic stairway,
- the northern area of the residential quarters and the baths.

The baths are well preserved, with calidarium, tepidarium, and frigidarium which had a splendid view over the sea and built in opus reticulatum that dates to the early Augustan era.

Many architectural decorations including frescoes, stuccoes, mosaics and Campana reliefs were found in the northern area of the villa in 1990–2005.

As there were no natural springs on the island, rain water had to be collected in cisterns and two huge ones covering 700 m^{2} and over 1200 m^{2} were built further south on the island, today called the Cistern di Villa Stefania and that of the Prisoners on the north-west.

=== The baths ===
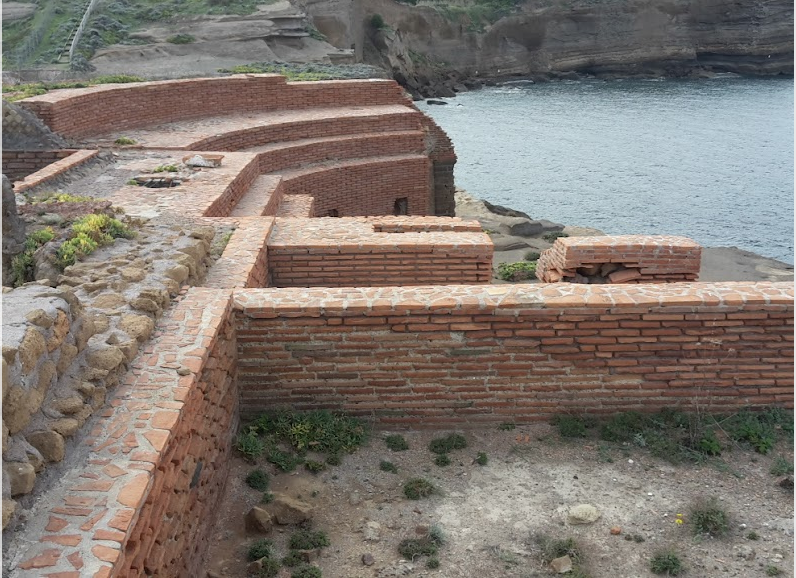
Baths great hot pool

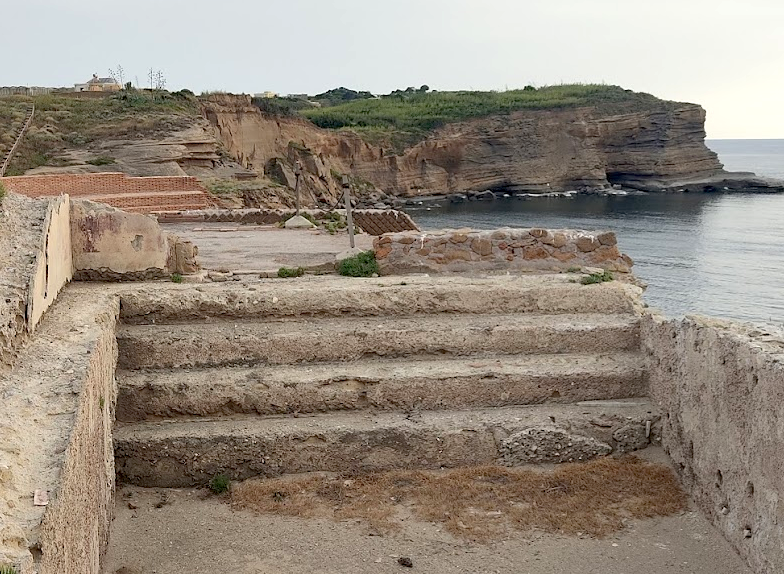
Baths pool

The baths are the best preserved part of the villa and are near to the residential area, along the edge of the cliffs where erosion has caused parts of the buildings to collapse. They are laid out on a different axis than the garden area. They included several pools and had a monumental stairway down to the sea.

The large baths included a suite of heated rooms: after the apodyterium (the dressing room) were the heated rooms, the tepidarium and the calidarium. Most notable of several pools is a grand semi-circular piscina calida (hot pool), with a novel and complex heating system on several levels, and the largest example in the ancient world. Of a later date, the calidarium had an exedra on its smallest side and was not aligned with the piscina calida, suggesting it was a later hot pool.

To heat such a large piscina calida, three tunnels for stokers led to circular furnace rooms, higher than the tunnels and where a tuff wall prevented fumes from entering the tunnels. Heat rose from the furnaces through three openings into the hypocaust above, between the suspended floor of the pool and a subfloor.

In a rare example of the use of metal in a Roman heating system, above each of the three furnaces was a so-called samovar, a domed metal plate supported by brick pilae on the sides, and which was part of the pool floor and in direct contact with the water. The hypocaust was also unusual in using metal verticals and grids to free the heating space from brick obstacles and increase circulation of hot air improving the heating of the pool floor.

The use of metal and iron which were only used in Roman times in buildings where the high cost for this type of advanced technology could be borne or justified in terms of cultural prestige, as in imperial buildings, shows the exceptional quality of the baths.

== Excavations ==
Excavation campaigns began in 1990 and lasted to 2005. The main areas excavated include the so-called 'Cistern of Villa Stefania', the so-called 'Cistern of Prisoners' and the thermal baths of the residential complex.
