= Villa Giulia, Bellagio =

Villa Giulia
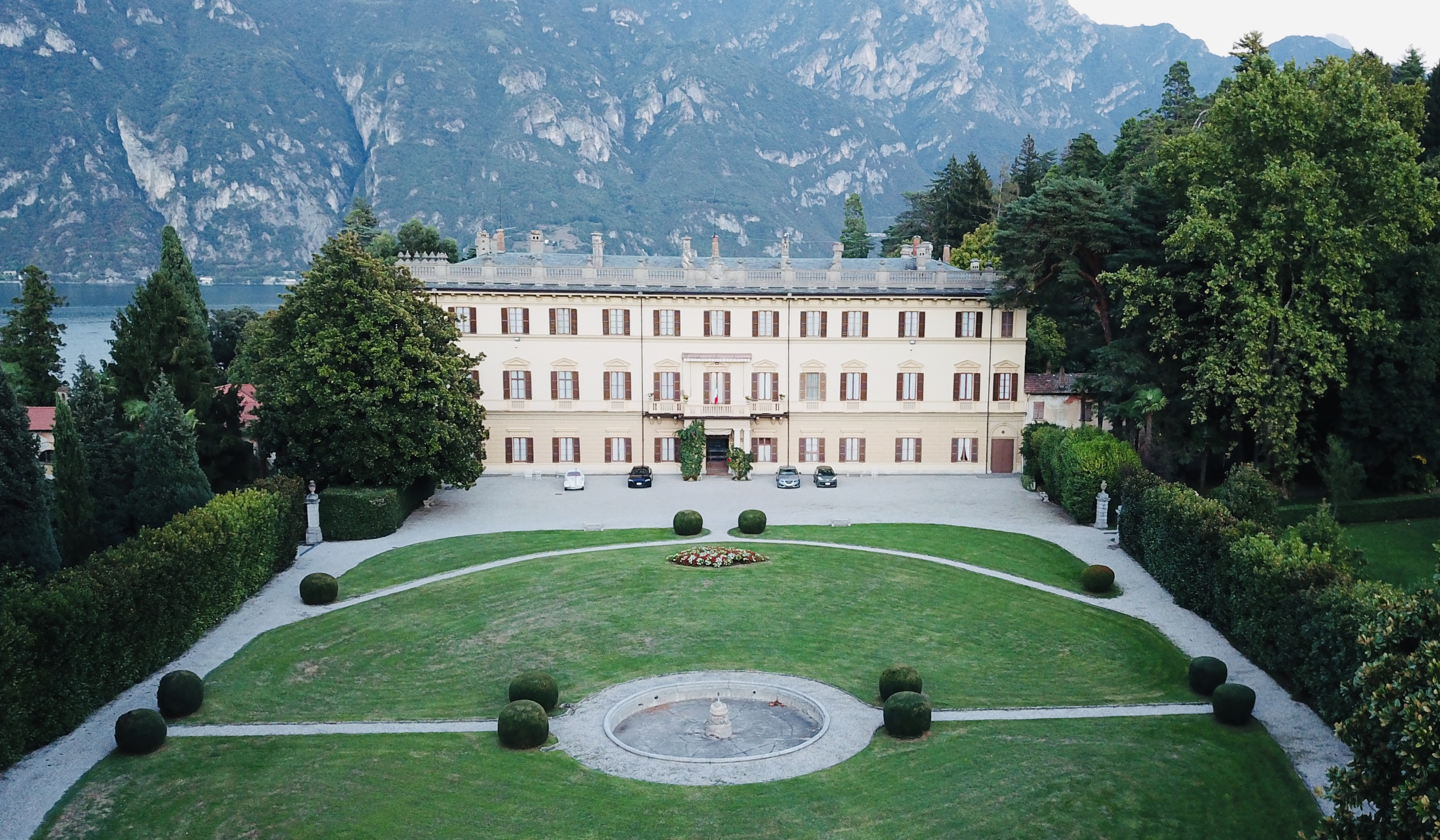
- Villa Giulia in 2022
- Click on the map for a full-screen view

General information
- Architectural style: Neoclassical
- Location: Bellagio, Italy
- Coordinates: 45°58′33.14″N 9°15′48.96″E

Villa Giulia is a neoclassical villa located in Bellagio on the shores of Lake Como, Italy.

== History ==
Built at the end of the 18th century by Count Pietro Venini on the site where the Camozzi family's summer residence once stood, the villa was completed in 1806 and dedicated to his wife, Giulia. Works also included significant landscaping to level the terrain around the building.

The villa passed briefly from the Venini family to Leopold I of Belgium who, however, did not frequent the property regularly due to his numerous political commitments. In 1865, following the king’s death, the villa was sold once again and became, for a few years, a luxury hotel. During that time, it was visited by a wealthy Polish banker, Baron Gay, who was seeking a mild climate where his wife—long afflicted with tuberculosis—could reside. Moved by the beauty of the place, he decided to purchase it. After his wife’s death, overwhelmed by grief and perhaps also affected by political and economic troubles, Gay sold the villa to the Romanian nobleman Enrico Kirakirschen, from whom it eventually passed to its current owners.

== Description ==
Positioned on elevated ground above the Bellagio peninsula, the villa overlooks both branches of Lake Como, creating a striking double perspective made possible by extensive landscaping work. The three-story, neoclassical building features symmetrical façades and a floor plan with a central section and two outward wings. The main floor is distinguished by large windows topped with pediments.

== Gallery ==
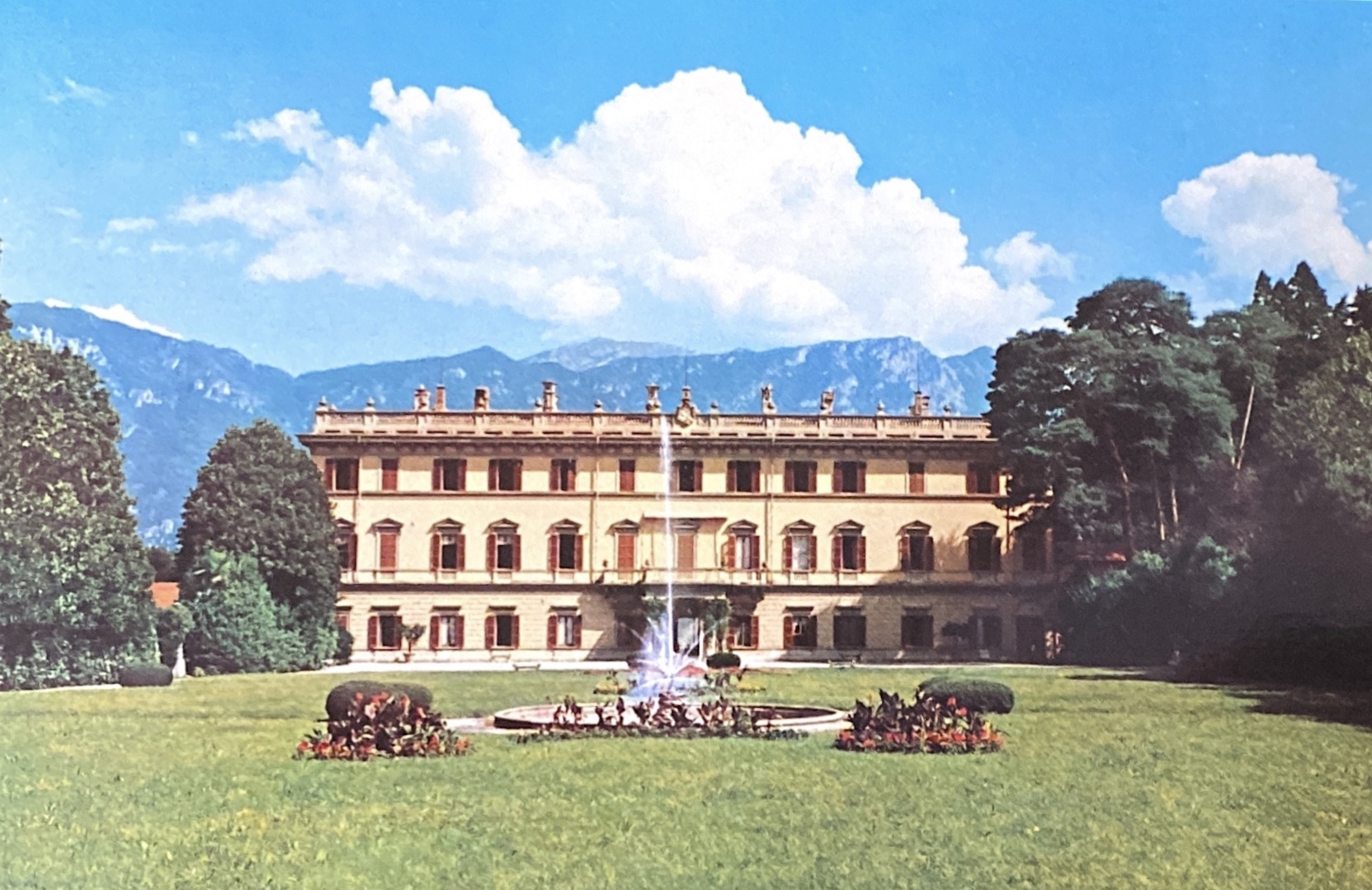

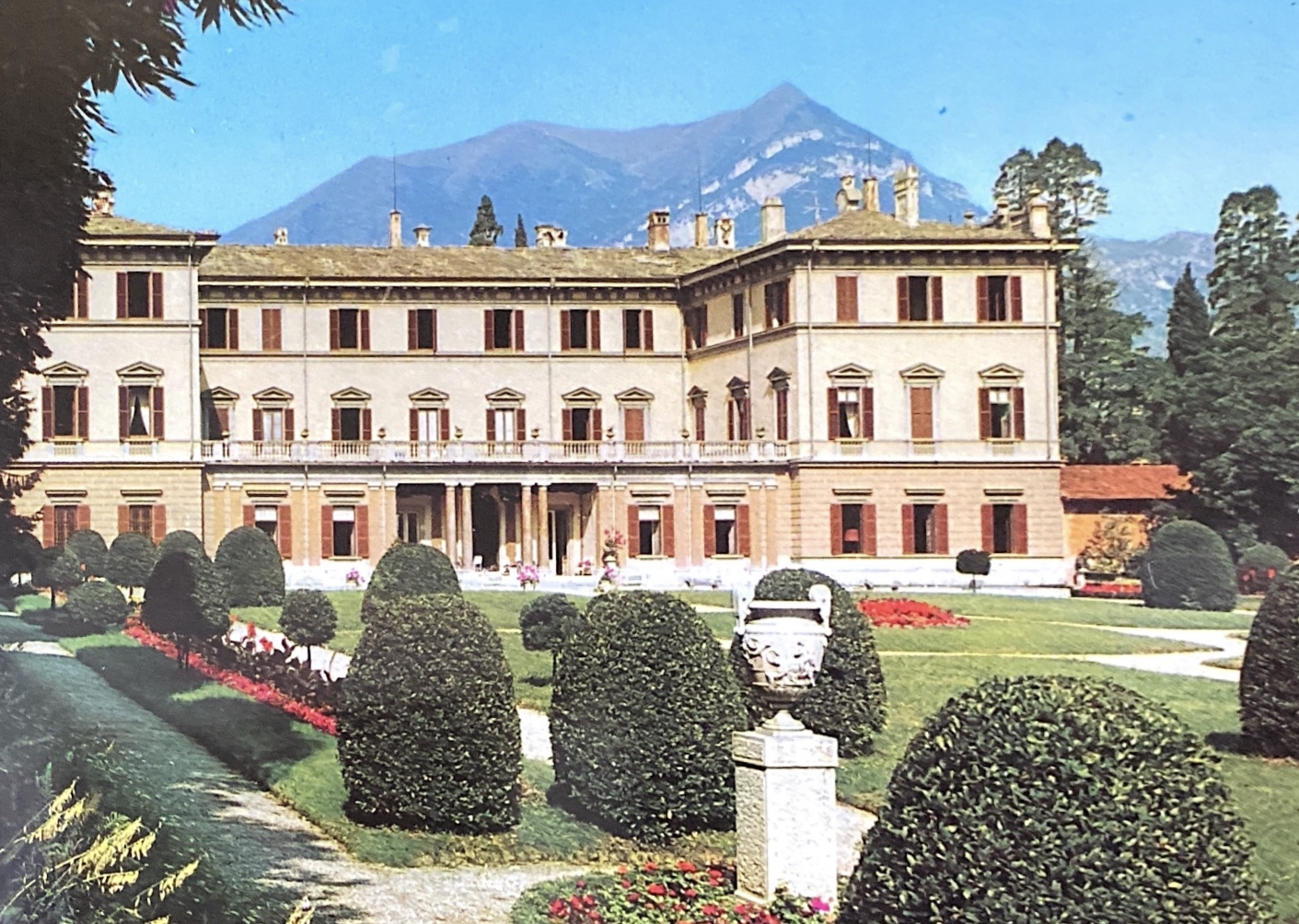

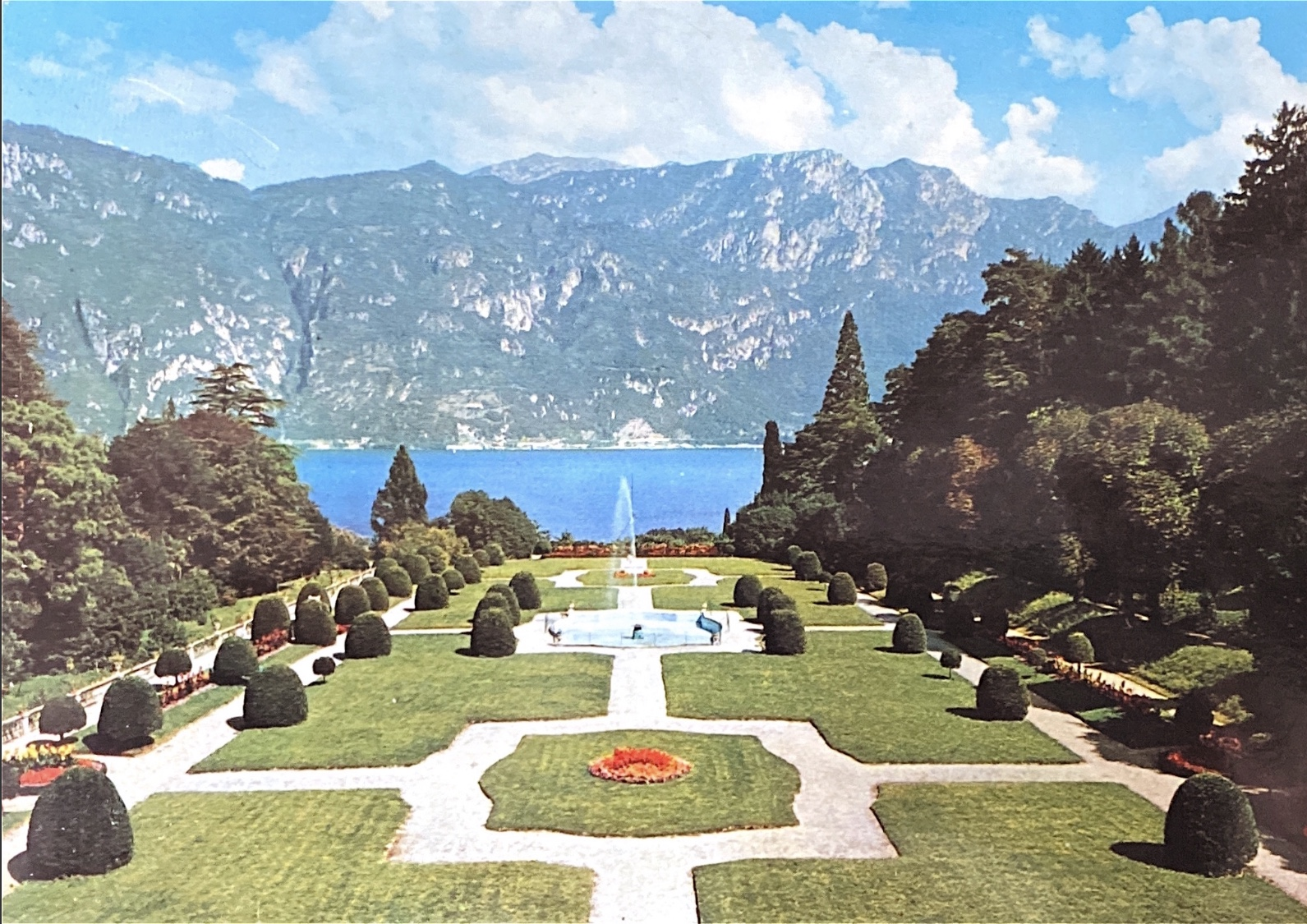
