= Ludovisi Throne =

Ancient sculpture from Locri, Italy

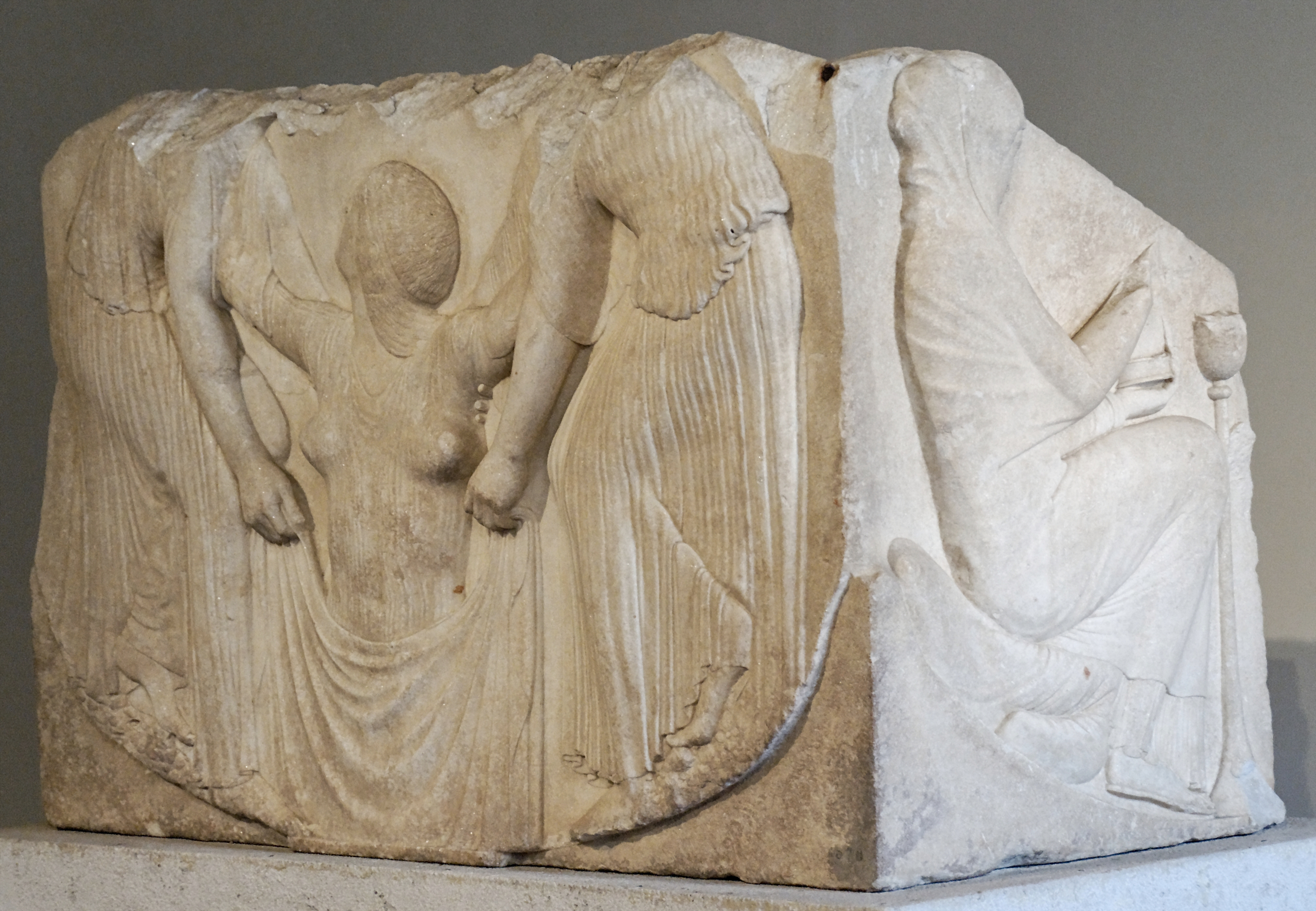
- Back and right side of the Thasos marble, Greek artwork, ca. 460 BC (authenticity disputed). Found in 1887 during public works in the Villa Ludovisi.
- Artist: Unknown (Western Greek artist from Magna Graecia)
- Year: 460 BC
- Medium: White marble
- Movement: Transitional between Archaic and Early Classical
- Subject: Aphrodite rising from the sea (disputed interpretations include Persephone and Hera Parthenos)
- Dimensions: 0.9 m × 1.42 m (35 in × 56 in)
- Location: Museo Nazionale Romano of Palazzo Altemps, Rome
- Owner: Italy
- Accession: 1894

The Ludovisi Throne is an ancient Greek sculpture from Locri, Southern Italy. Not an actual throne, the sculpture is a block of white marble intricately carved with bas-reliefs on its three visible sides, with the primary side's relief considered by many to depict Aphrodite rising from the sea. It is a product of a transitional phase between the Archaic and Early Classical styles of Greek art, circa 460 BC. Currently, it resides in the Museo Nazionale Romano of Palazzo Altemps in Rome, having been acquired by Italy in 1894.

The central relief of the throne, encompassing a height of 0.9 m and a length of 1.42 m, is traditionally interpreted as the goddess Aphrodite, enveloped in her signature diaphanous attire, being aided by two Horae on the shore. Despite this, the unique iconography present makes identification uncertain, prompting some experts to speculate alternative subjects, like the chthonic deity Persephone, or even Hera Parthenos emerging from the waters. The side panels are also subject to various interpretations, with one showcasing a veiled woman with incense and the other, a young girl playing the aulos, a double flute.

== Description ==
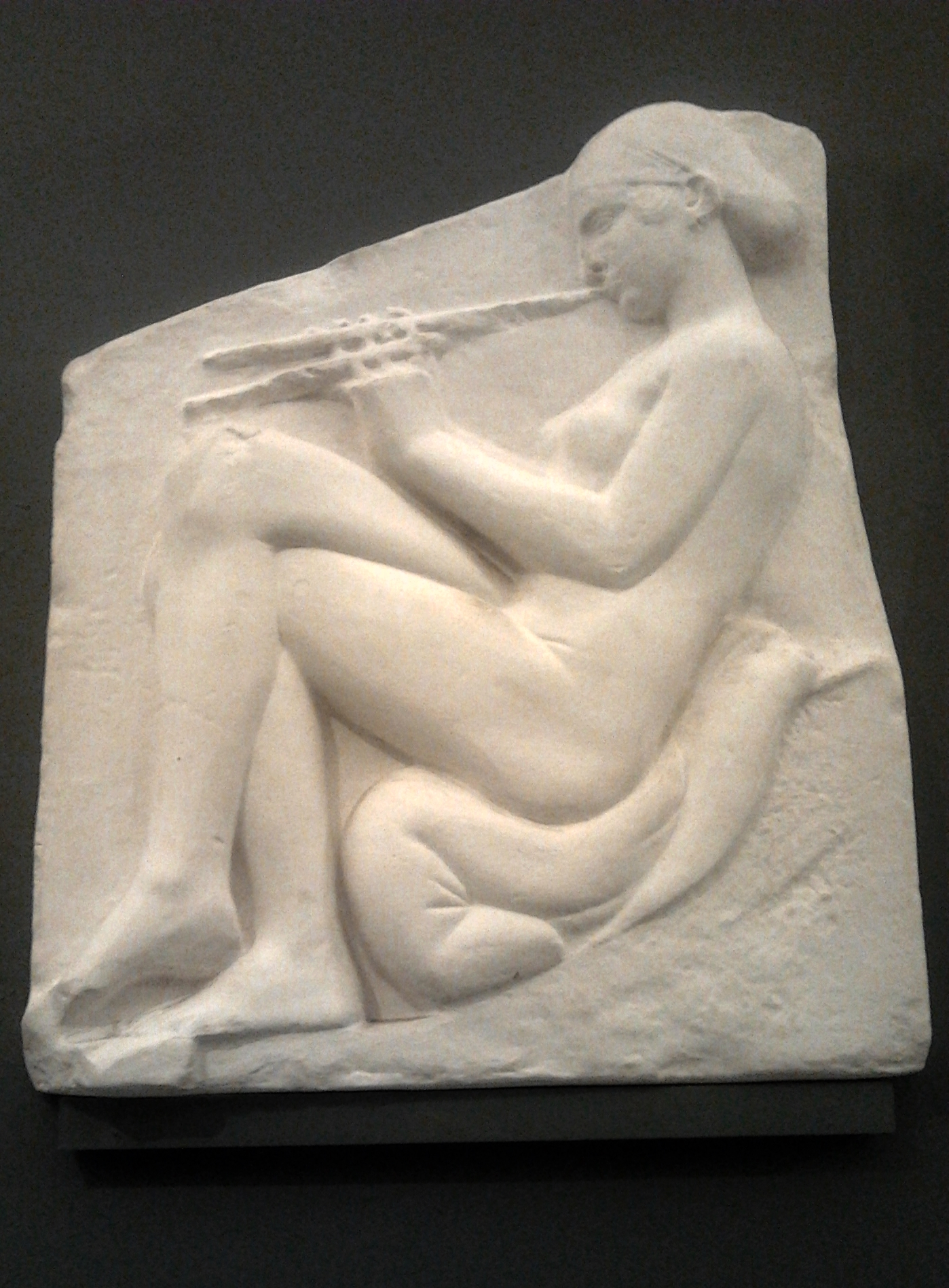
Left-hand panel: a woman playing the aulos

The central relief is most customarily read as Aphrodite rising from the sea, a motif known as Venus Anadyomene (height 0.9 m, length 1.42 m). The goddess, in clinging diaphanous draperies, is helped by two attendant Horae standing on the shore, who prepared to veil her with a cloth they jointly hold, which hides her from the waist down. The two reliefs on the flanking sides discreetly turn their backs to the mystery of the central subject. The right relief shows a crouching veiled woman who offers incense from a thymiaterion held in her left hand, in an incense burner on a stand. The right slab's dimensions are height 0.87 m, length 0.69 m. The other shows a young nude girl, seated with one knee thrown over the other who plays the double flute called the aulos; her hair is bound in a kerchief. The dimensions of the left slab are height 0.84 m, length 0.68 m.

The iconography of the subject is without a parallel in Antiquity, thus the very subject of the relief is in doubt. Alternative views, since the flanking attendants stand on pebbled ground, have been offered: that the emerging figure is that of the ritual robing of a chthonic goddess, probably Persephone, rising from a cleft in the earth (Pandora is similarly shown in Attic vase-paintings) or of Hera emerging reborn from the waters of Kanathos near Tiryns as Hera Parthenos.

== Provenance ==
The Throne was found in 1887, in the formerly extensive grounds of the Villa Ludovisi, Rome, where the ancient gardens of Sallust had been located. It was moved into the Villa Ludovisi, whence the name. The Ludovisi are a papal family who have been patrons and collectors since the early seventeenth century. Financial difficulties forced a sale of the Ludovisi collections to the Italian State in 1894. The Villa Ludovisi grounds were broken into lots, streets put through and the district developed and unalterably changed. Conclusions about the object's original purpose, the meaning of its reliefs and its place of facture are all debated, but in 1982 it was securely linked to a newly studied temple at Marasà, near Locri, in Calabria, an Ionic temple of Aphrodite that was rebuilt internally in 480 BCE. A reconstruction of the throne was shown to fit exactly into remaining blocks in the temple's foundations, and it has been suggested that terracotta votive plaques, or pinakes, of cults at Lokri Epizefiri, are the only stylistic parallel to the Throne.

== Doubts ==
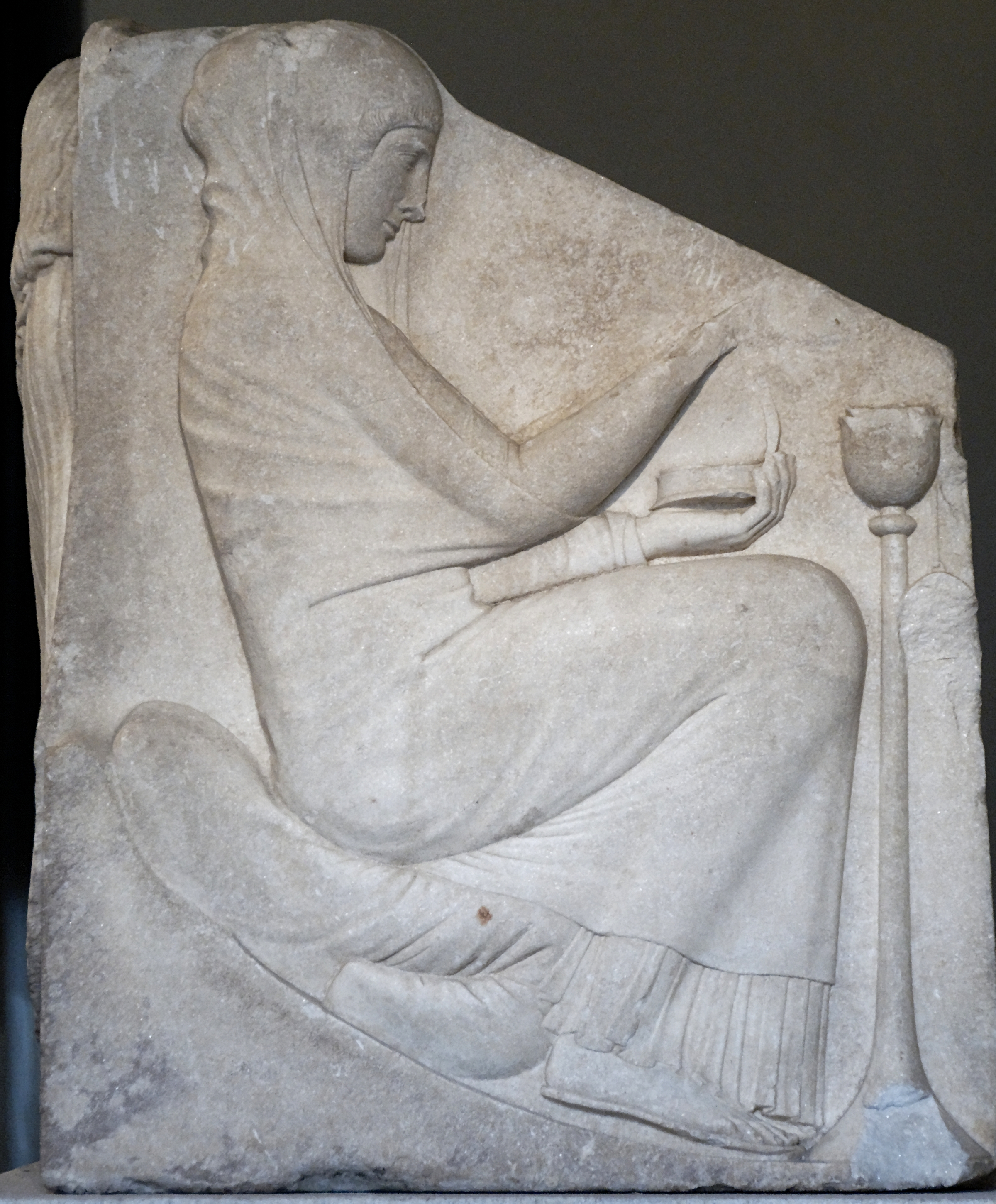
Right-hand panel: crouching veiled woman offering incense

The time period's notable lack of similar female nudes and anatomical discrepancies in the artwork led some scholars to cast doubt on its origins and authenticity. Notably, a 1996 article pointed out potential derivations from known artworks of that era.

Further complicating the Throne's history is its counterpart, the so-called "Boston Throne." Housed in the Museum of Fine Arts in Boston, this similarly designed artifact emerged shortly after the Ludovisi Throne's auction. Some speculate it is a Roman creation or even a forgery from the late 19th century.

The only other representations of the female nude at this period (c. 460) are on Attic pottery. Criticisms of anomalies in anatomy and detail and doubts of the Ludovisi Throne's authenticity were, for example, that the much-later Roman representation of Penelope mourning for Odysseus is the only iconological type in classical sculpture which depicts a woman with legs crossed: the Penelope is fully clothed. Penelope awaiting (along with Telemachus) for Odysseus' return to Ithaca is depicted with legs crossed (left leg over right leg, viewed from the left) on an Attic red-figure skyphos from Chiusi, dated ca. 440 BC.

== Boston Throne ==
The Ludovisi Throne's less accomplished twin, the Boston Throne in the Museum of Fine Arts, Boston, which appeared in 1894, shortly after the Ludovisi auction and was bought by the connoisseur Edward Perry Warren, who donated it to Boston, is widely doubted. A conference at Palazzo Grassi, Venice, 1996, compared the two objects. If it is not a forgery of c. 1894, it may be a Roman sculpture designed to complete the Greek one in a setting in the gardens of Sallust. Thomas Hoving, once director of the Metropolitan Museum of Art, recollects being told by an art dealer in Italy that the twin throne in Boston was the work of the great faker Alceo Dossena.

== Gallery ==
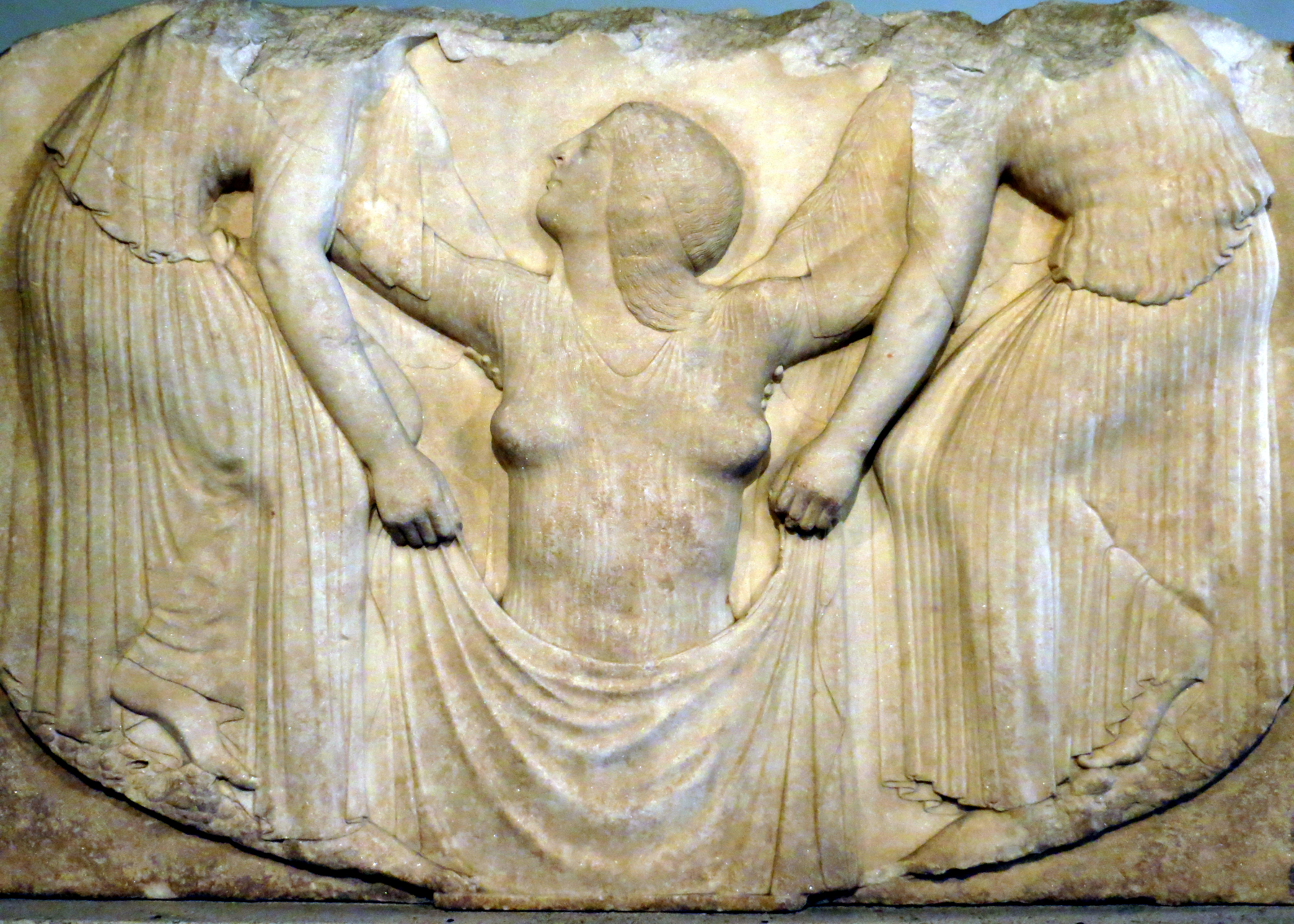
Back of Ludovisi Throne.

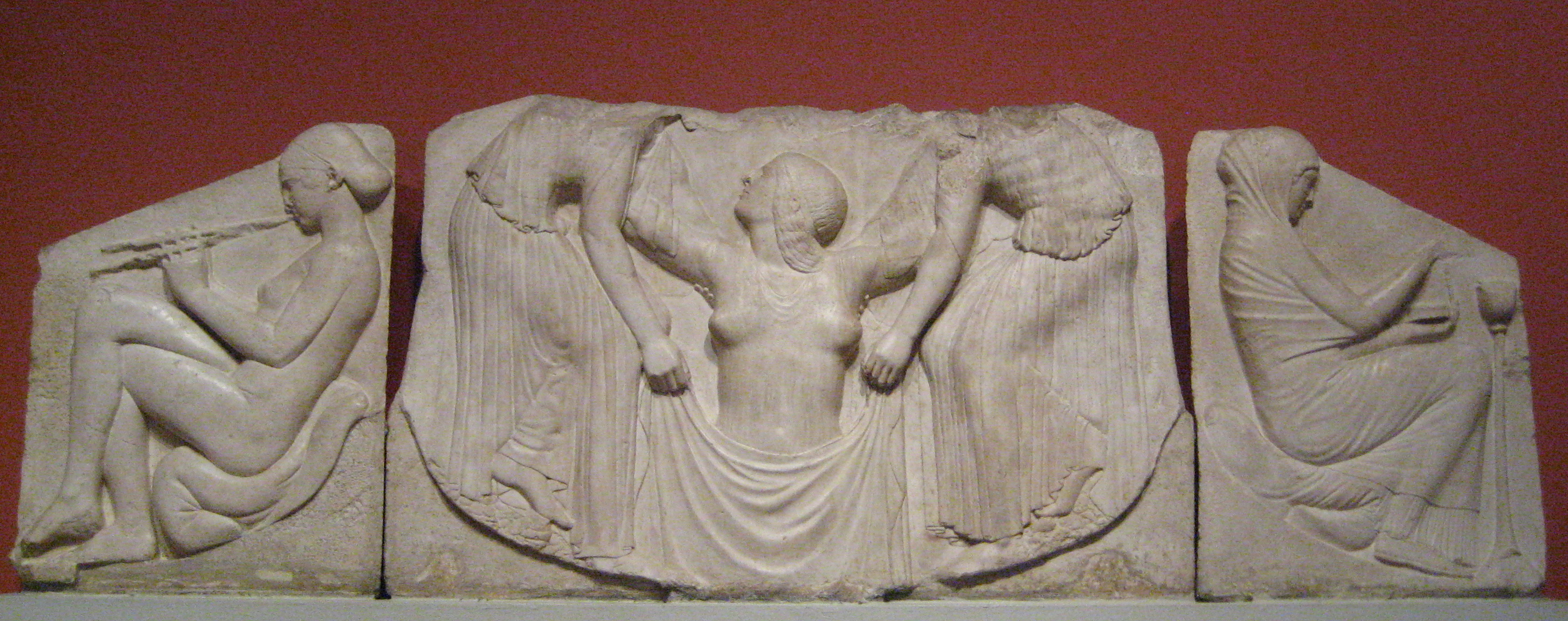
Ludovisi Throne (casting in Pushkin museum).

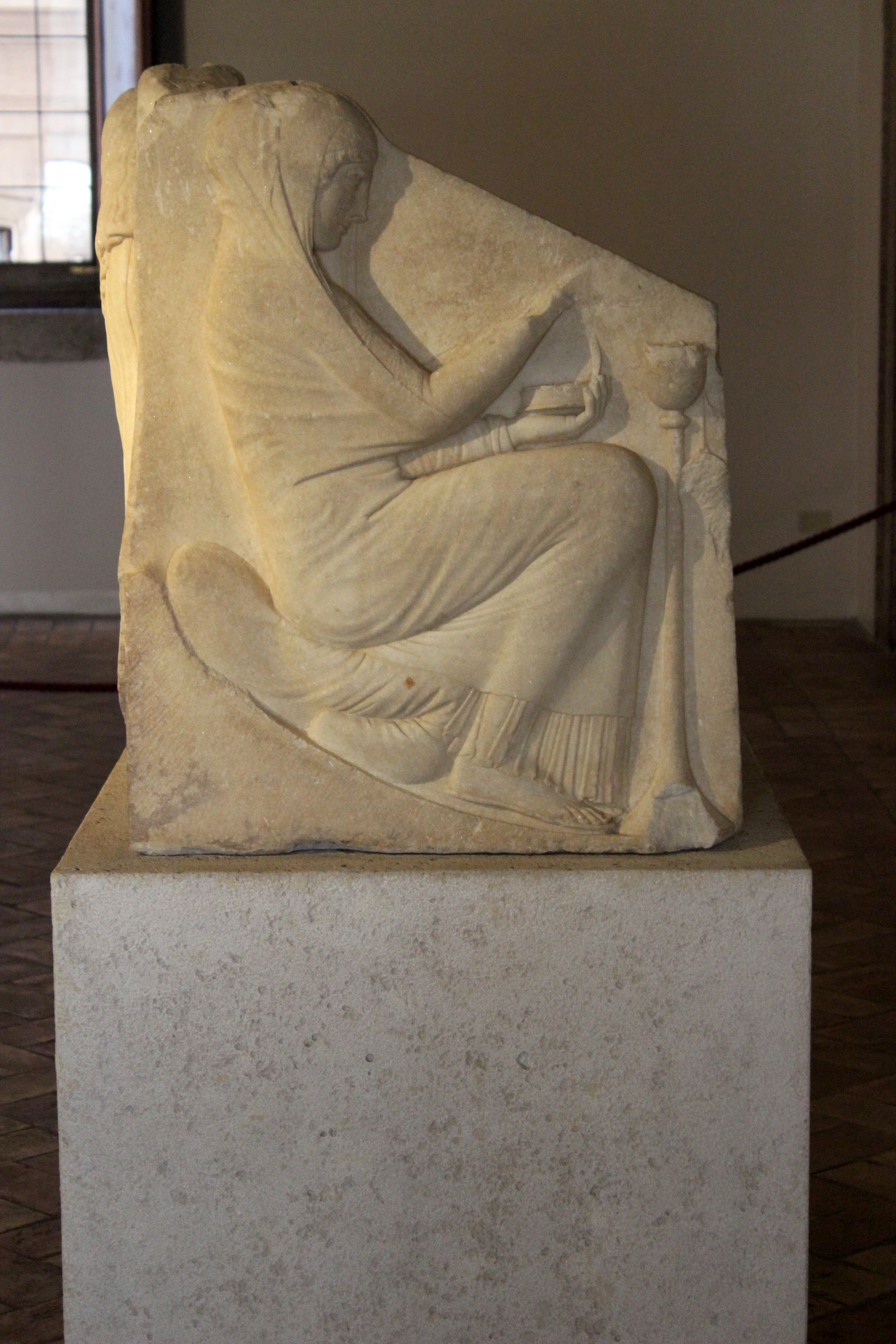
Detail of veiled woman burning incense.

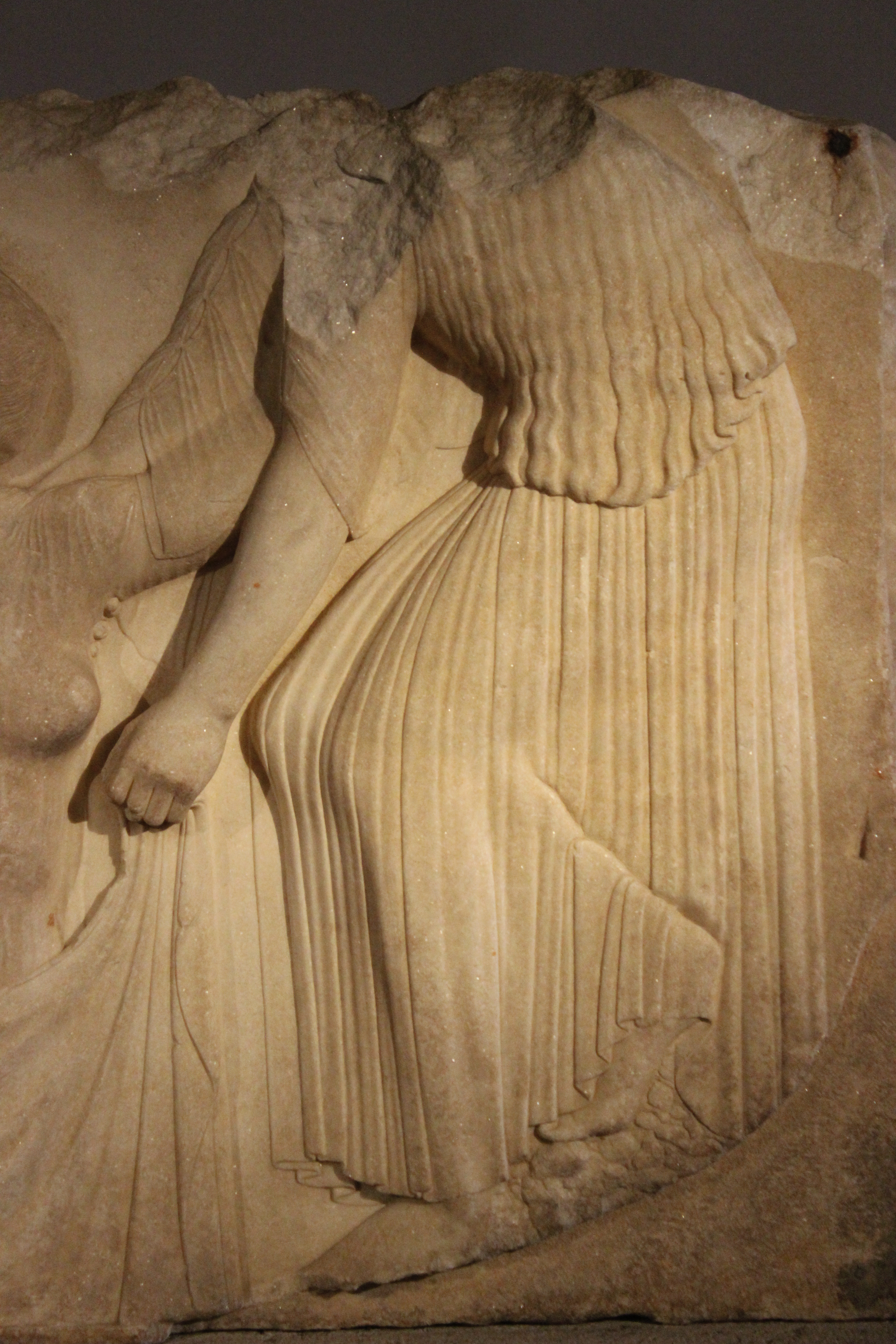
Detail of woman

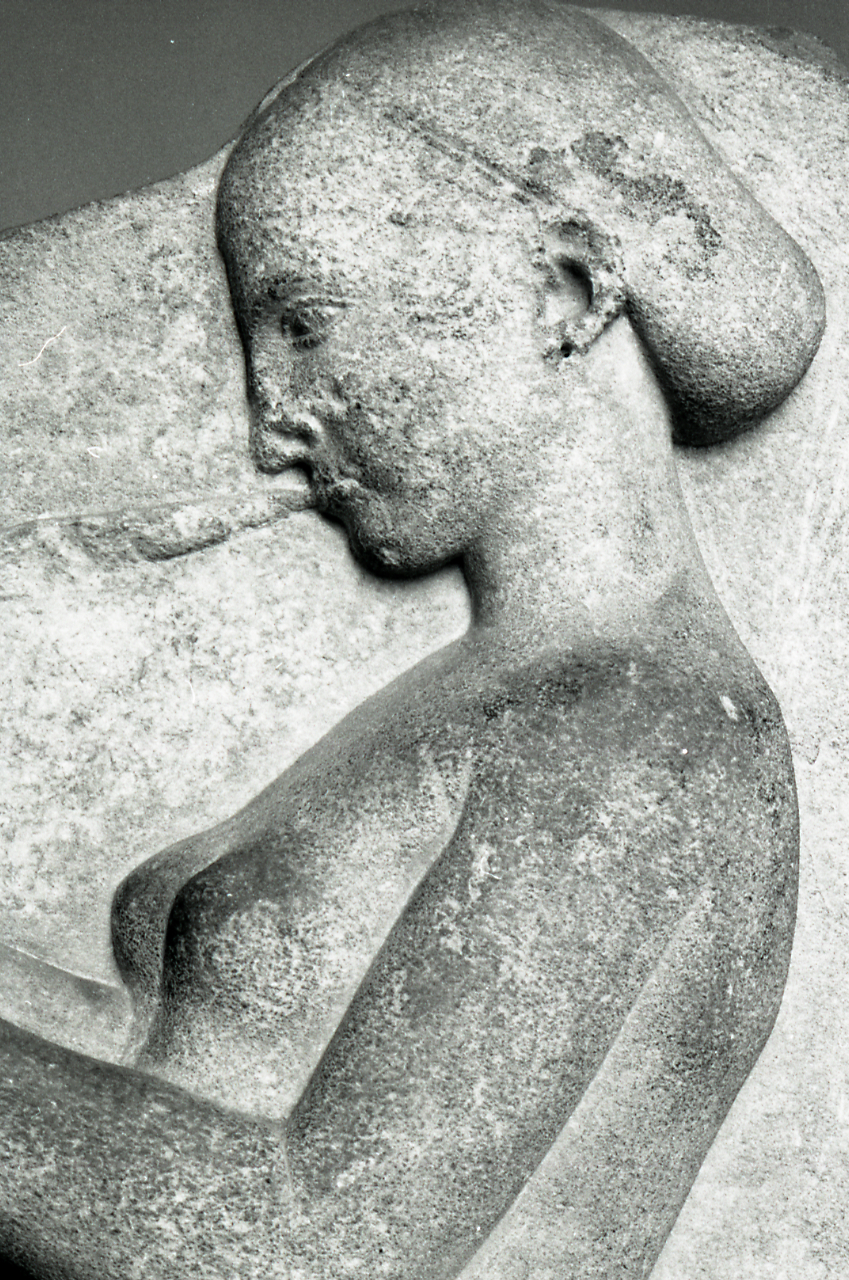
Detail of female flute player
