= Boncompagni (surname) =

Boncompagni is a surname associated with the Boncompagni princely Italian family. Notable people with the surname include:

- Baldassarre Boncompagni, or Prince Baldassarre Boncompagni-Ludovisi (1821–1894), Italian historian of thematics and aristocrat
- Filippo Boncompagni (1548–1586), Italian Cardinal
- Giacomo Boncompagni (1548–1612), Italian feudal lord, the illegitimate son of Pope Gregory XIII
- Gianni Boncompagni (1932–2017), Italian television and radio presenter, director, writer
- Girolamo Boncompagni (1622–1684), Roman Catholic cardinal
- Gregorio II Boncompagni (1642–1707), Italian nobleman and duke and grand-nephew of Pope Gregory XIII
- Maria Eleonora I Boncompagni (1686–1745), Italian princess and marchioness
- Pietro Boncompagni (1592–1664), Italian arts collector
- Ugo Boncompagni (1502–1585), birth name of Pope Gregory XIII
- Francesco Boncompagni Ludovisi (1886–1955), Italian politician

== See also ==
- Boncompagni Ludovisi Decorative Art Museum or Museo Boncompagni, Rome, part of the National Gallery of Modern Art of Rome
- Casino di Villa Boncompagni Ludovisi, a villa in Porta Pinciana, Rome, Italy
