= Ignazio Boncompagni-Ludovisi =

- Cardinal-Priest
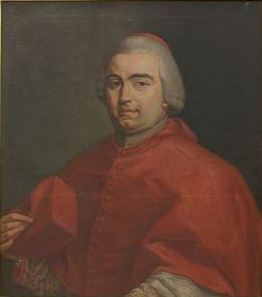
- Church: Roman Catholic Church

Orders
- Created cardinal: 17 July 1775 by Pope Pius VI

Personal details
- Born: 18 June 1743 Rome, Papal States
- Died: 9 August 1790 (aged 47) Bagni di Lucca, Grand Duchy of Tuscany

Don Ignazio Gaetano Boncompagni-Ludovisi (Rome, 18 January/June 1743 – Bagni di Lucca, 9 August 1790) was a priest and cardinal of the Roman Catholic Church.

== Background ==
Born into an old aristocratic house, Don Gaetano I Boncompagni Ludovisi, Prince of Piombino and Duke of Sora, etc, and wife Laura Chigi of the Princes of Farnese. The families had multiple popes in their lineage: the Boncompagni had Pope Gregory XIII (1502 – 1585); the Chigi had Pope Alexander VII (1599 – 1667); and the Ludovisi had Pope Gregory XV (1554 – 1623), among other lines and popes. As the second son, he elected an ecclesiastical career. He studied at the Sapienza University, and earned a doctorate in law in 1765.

Since 1754, Pope Benedict XIV gave his family all the benefices of the patronage that the Boncompagni Ludovisi exercised in the dioceses of Aquino and Sora, vacant since the resignation of Cardinal Pier Luigi Carafa. In 1763, he was named by a bull of Pope Clement XIII as the archimandrite of the monastery of Sant'Adriano, diocese of Rossano; and abbot commendatario of Santa Maria di Giosefat in Cosenza. In 1765, he became privy chamberlain of the pope and referendary of the Tribunals of the Apostolic Signatura of Justice and of Grace. In 1766, he was named as vice-legate in Bologna; the city associated with the Boncompagni family. He remained in administrative positions in Bologna over the years, often proposing controversial reforms on land, water and tax management.

He was initially made cardinal in pectore by Pope Pius VI on July 17, 1775; he donned the cardinal's hat on a ceremony on November 16, 1775. He held various posts and assignments. Unlike other cardinals he had never served in either a subdiaconate and diaconate position. He was named Secretary of State for the Papacy from 1785 until 1789, when he had to resign because of his health. By the next year in 1790, he had moved to Bagni di Lucca, in search of better health. He was buried in Sant'Ignazio, Rome.
