= Cardinals created by Gregory XIII =

Catholic appointments from 1572 to 1584

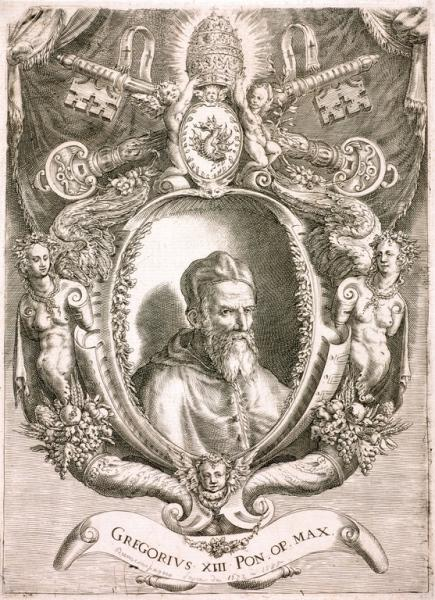
Pope Gregory XIII (1502–85).

Pope Gregory XIII (r. 1572–1585) created 34 cardinals in eight consistories.

== 2 June 1572 ==
1. Filippo Boncompagni

== 5 July 1574 ==
1. Filippo Guastavillani

== 19 November 1576 ==
1. Andrew of Austria

== 3 March 1577 ==
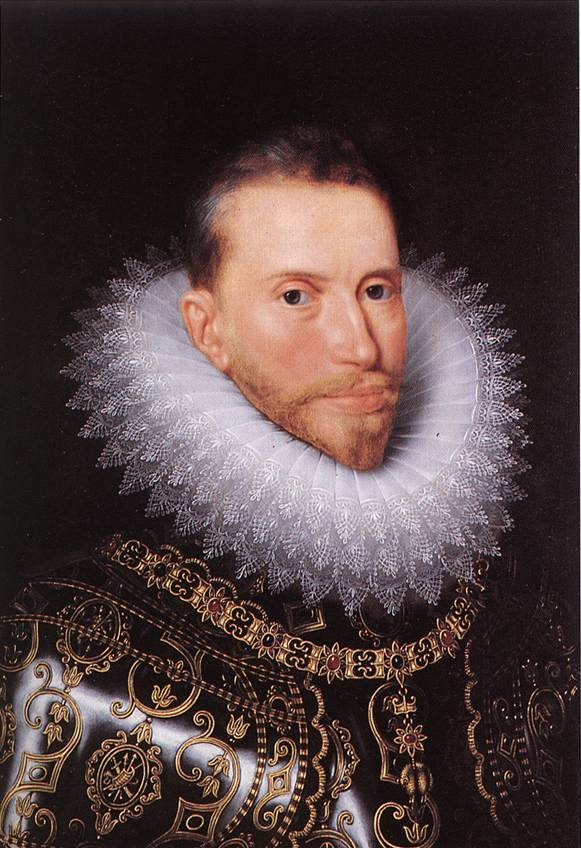
Albert of Austria (1559–1621), made a cardinal on March 3, 1577.

1. Albert of Austria

== 21 February 1578 ==
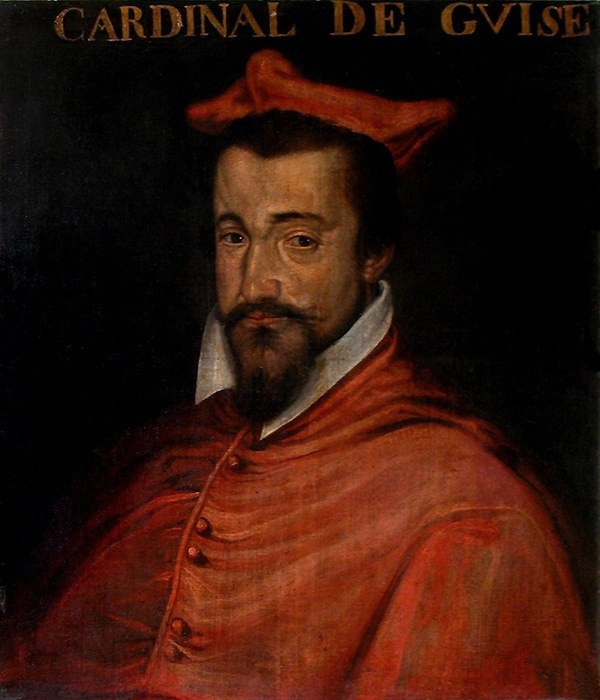
Louis of Guise (1555–88), made a cardinal on February 21, 1578.

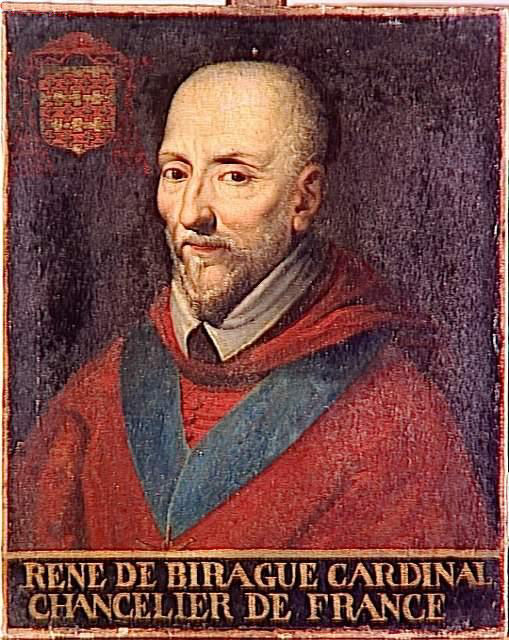
René de Birague (1506–83), made a cardinal on February 21, 1576.

1. Alessandro Riario
2. Claude de La Baume
3. Louis of Guise
4. Gerard van Groesbeeck
5. Pedro de Deza
6. Fernando de Toledo Oropesa
7. René de Birague
8. Charles de Lorraine de Vaudémont
9. Giovanni Vincenzo Gonzaga

== 15 December 1578 ==
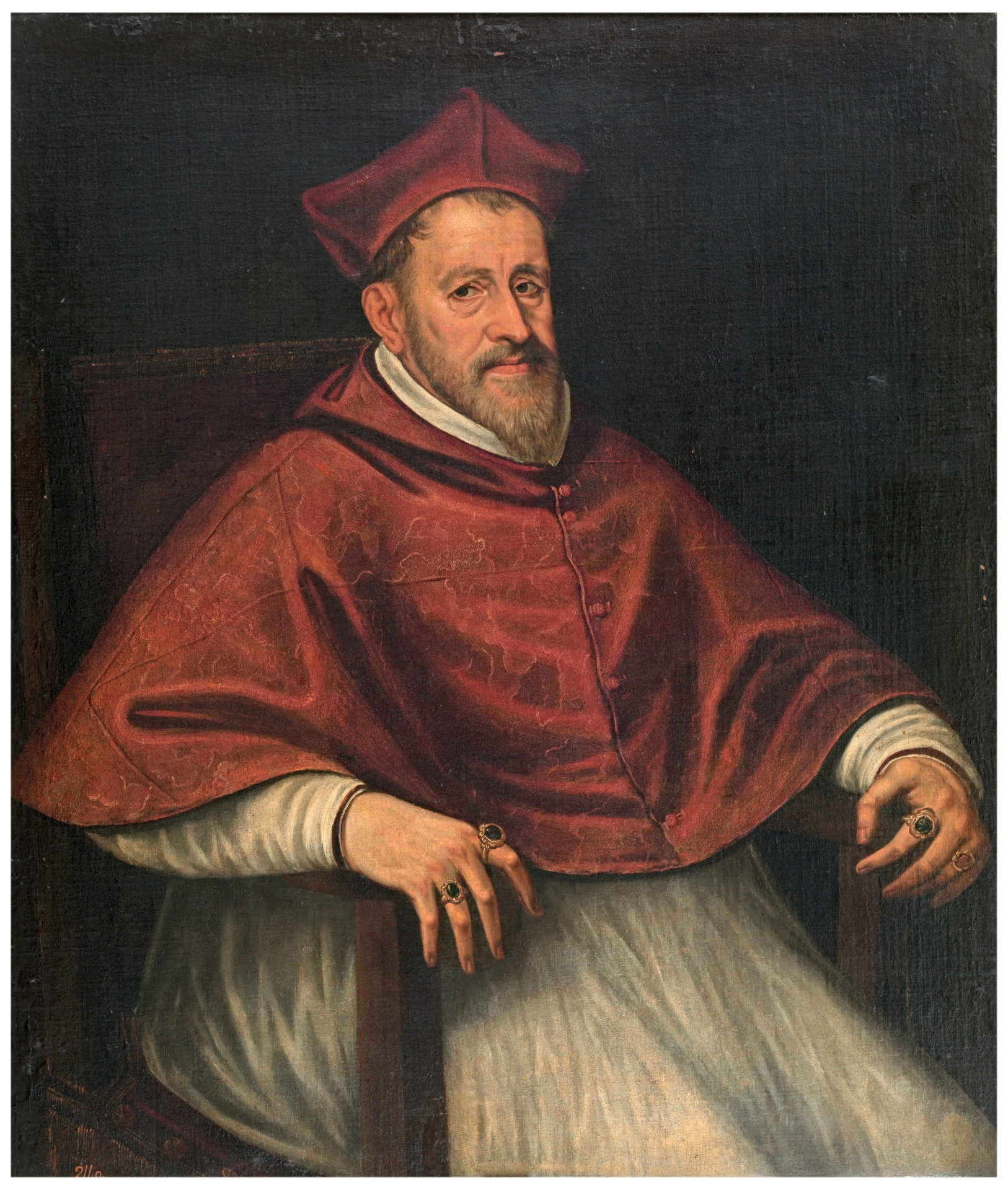
Gaspar de Quiroga y Vela (1512–95), made a cardinal on December 15, 1578.

1. Gaspar de Quiroga y Vela

== 12 December 1583 ==
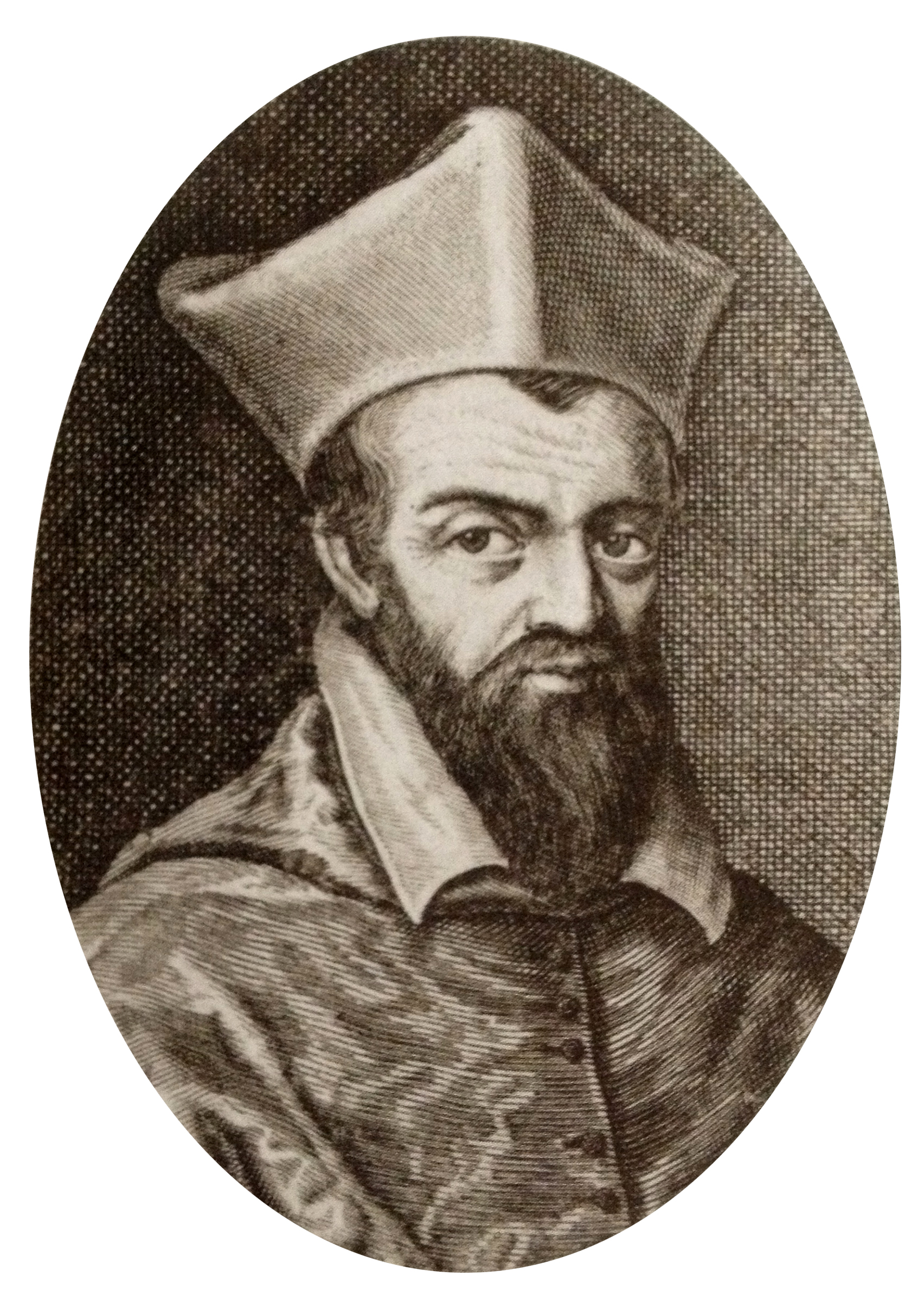
François de Joyeuse (1562–1612), made a cardinal on December 12, 1583.

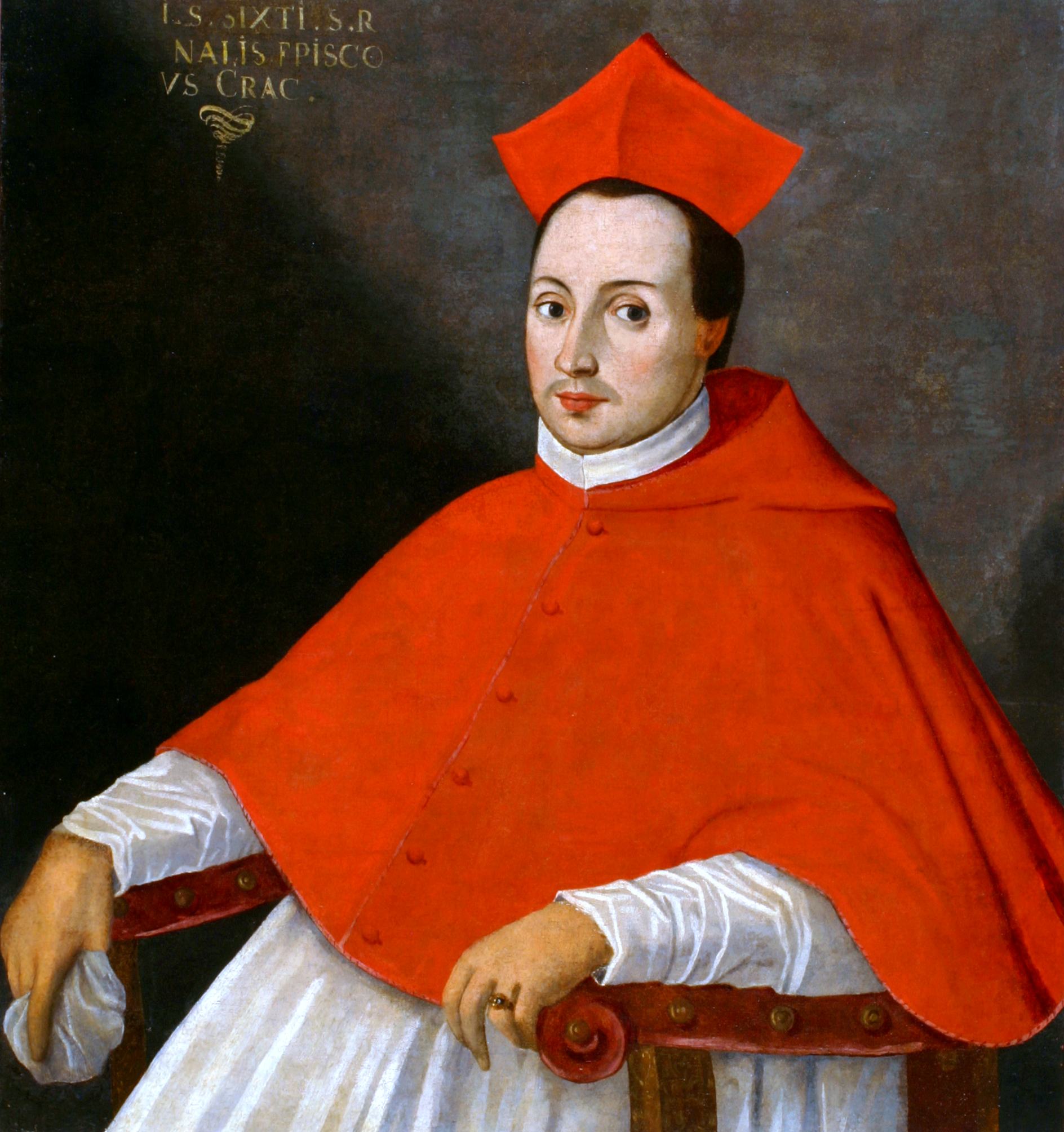
Jerzy Radziwiłł (1556–1600), made a cardinal on December 12, 1583.

1. Giovanni Antonio Facchinetti de Nuce
2. Giambattista Castagna
3. Alessandro Ottaviano de' Medici
4. Rodrigo de Castro Osorio
5. François de Joyeuse
6. Michele Della Torre
7. Giulio Canani
8. Niccolò Sfondrati
9. Anton Maria Salviati
10. Agostino Valier
11. Vincenzo Lauro
12. Filippo Spinola
13. Alberto Bolognetti
14. Jerzy Radziwiłł
15. Matthieu Cointerel
16. Simeone Tagliavia d'Aragonia
17. Scipione Lancelotti
18. Charles II de Bourbon-Vendôme
19. Francesco Sforza

== 4 July 1584 ==
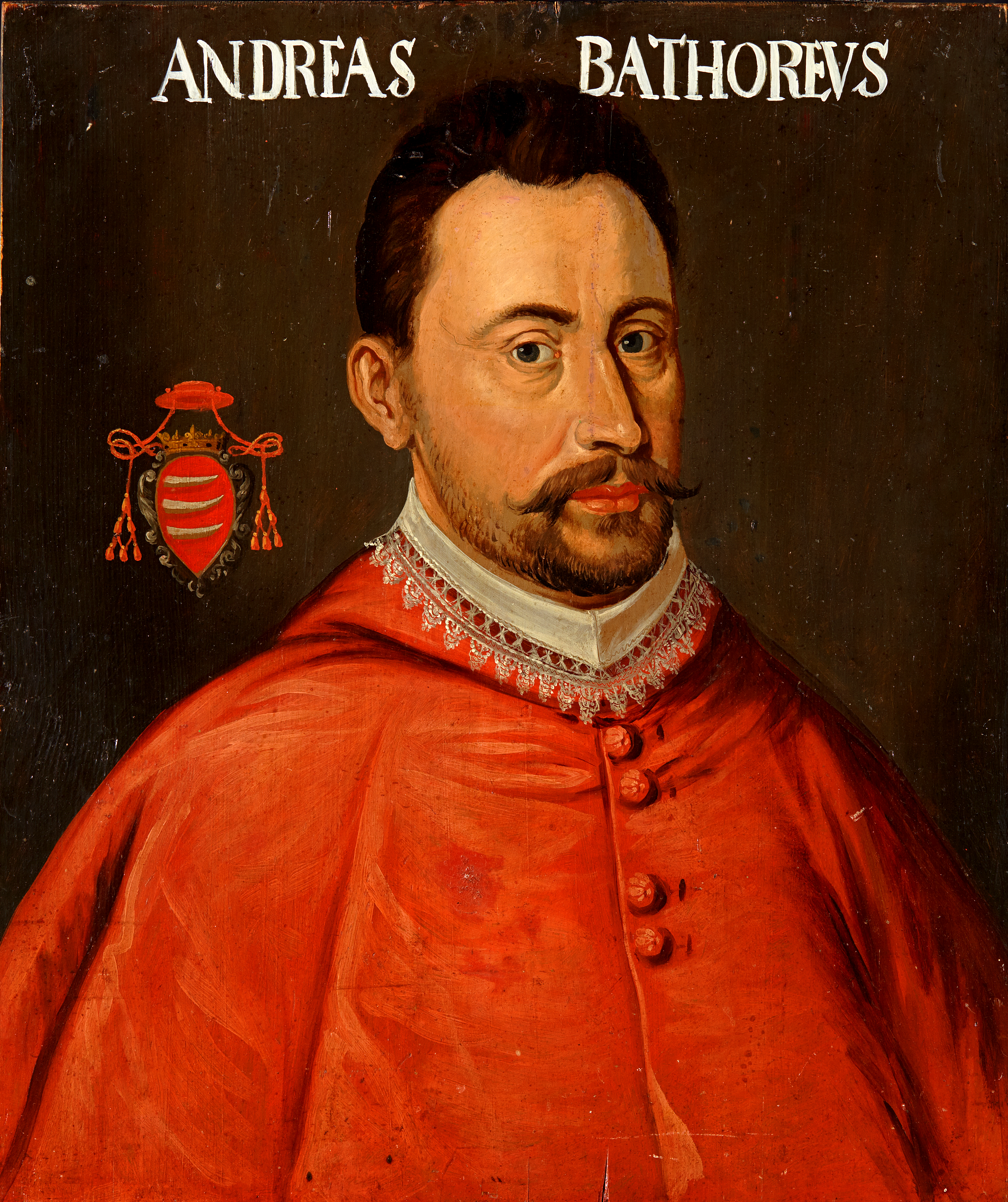
Andrew Báthory (c1562-99), made a cardinal on July 4, 1584.

1. Andrew Báthory
