= Francesco Boncompagni Ludovisi =

Italian politician

Don Francesco Boncompagni Ludovisi Prince of Piombino
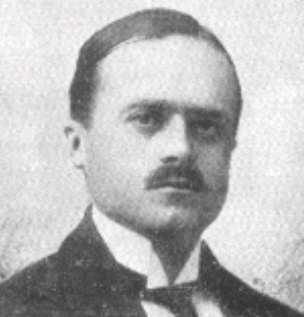

Governor of Rome
- In office 1928–1935
- Preceded by: Ludovico Spada Veralli Potenziani
- Succeeded by: Giuseppe Bottai

Personal details
- Born: 20 October 1886 Villa La Quiete, Foligno
- Died: 7 June 1955 (aged 68) Rome, Italy
- Spouse: Nicoletta Prinetti-Castelletti (m. 1908; died 1931)
- Children: 4
- Parent(s): Ugo Maria, Prince Boncompagni-Ludovisi; Laura Altieri

Don Francesco Antonio Maria, Prince Boncompagni-Ludovisi (20 October 1886 – 7 June 1955), Prince of Piombino (heir of a former Sovereign Italian State), Duke of Sora, etc, was an Italian politician.

== Early life ==
He was born on 20 October 1886 at Villa La Quiete in Foligno into the princely Boncompagni family. He was the son of Don Ugo Maria, Prince Boncompagni-Ludovisi, Duke of Sora (1856–1935), and his second wife, and second cousin, Donna Laura Altieri of the Princes Altieri, Princes of Oriolo, etc. (1858–1892). His father, who did not assume the Piombino title, had been previously married to Donna Vittoria Patrizi-Naro-Montoro in 1877 before her death in Paris in January 1883. After his mother's death in Rome on 4 May 1892, his father became a priest on 27 January 1895.

He was also a descendant of Pope Gregory XIII.

== Career ==
During World War I, after Italy joined the Allies in May 1915, the Prince fought for the duration of the conflict. While in service, he took photographs, the originals of which are maintained in the Casino di Villa Boncompagni Ludovisi in Rome.

He was the 3rd fascist governor of Rome from 1928 to 1935. He served in the Senate of the Kingdom of Italy.

== Personal life ==
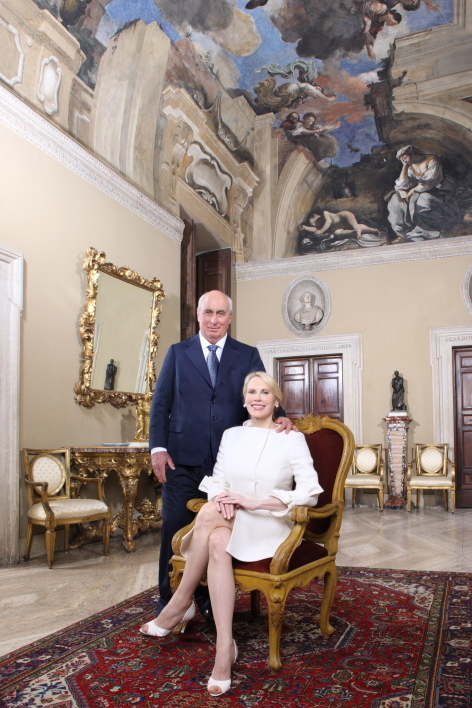
Photo of his grandson, Prince Niccolò Francesco Boncompagni-Ludovisi of Piombino, at his 2009 wedding

On 20 February 1908 in Rome, he married Nicoletta of the Marquesses Prinetti-Castelletti (1891–1931). Together, they were the parents of:

- Donna Laura, Princess Boncompagni-Ludovisi (1908–1975), who married Annibale, Count Brandolini d'Adda in Rome in 1925. They divorced in 1935, and he married secondly Mario Piroddi in Spezia in 1936.
- Don Gregorio, Prince Boncompagni-Ludovisi (1910–1988), Prince of Piombino, Duke of Sora, etc.; he married Bonacossa of the Barons Aliotti, widow of Paolo Parodi-Delfino, in Rome in 1939.
- Donna Giulia, Princess Boncompagni-Ludovisi (1914–1996), who married her second cousin, Giovanni Battista Maria Boncompagni-Ludovisi-Rondinelli-Vitelli in Rome in 1932.
- Don Alberico, Prince Boncompagni-Ludovisi (1918–2005), Prince of Venosa; he married Letitia of the Counts Pecci-Blunt in Rome in 1941. They divorced in 1982.

His wife died in Rome on 2 March 1931. He died in Rome, Italy on 7 June 1955.

=== Descendants ===
Through his son Don Gregorio, he was a grandfather of Don Niccolò Francesco, Prince Boncompagni-Ludovisi (1941–2018), Prince of Piombino, Duke of Sora, etc., who married Donna Benedetta Maria Barberini-Colonna di Sciarra of the Princes of Carbognano, Dukes of Bassanello, Montelibretti et Anticoli Corrado, etc. in 1964. (Note: Don Niccolò was the father of Don Francesco Maria, Prince Boncompagni-Ludovisi (b. 1965), who married Marchioness Violante Guerrieri-Gonzaga; Don Ignazio Maria, Prince Boncompagni-Ludovisi (b. 1967), who married Gaia Bulgari; Don Bante Maria, Prince Boncompagni-Ludovisi (b. 1970), who married (and divorced) Cristina Crociani) and then married Delphina Lapham).) They divorced in Rome in 1985 (annulled in 1989) and he married Ludmilla Petrovna Sisova, formerly Denisovitch in 1992. After her death, he married Rita Jenrette (née Carpenter), in 2009.

Through his son Don Alberico, he was a grandfather of Donna Francesca Eleonora Cosima, Princess Boncompagni-Ludovisi (b. 1943), who married Piero, Marquess Antinori, in 1966.

Preceded by Ludovico Spada Veralli Potenziani	Governor of Rome; 1928–1935	Succeeded by Giuseppe Bottai
