= Costanza Sforza =

Italian noblewoman (1550–1617)

- Duchess of Sora
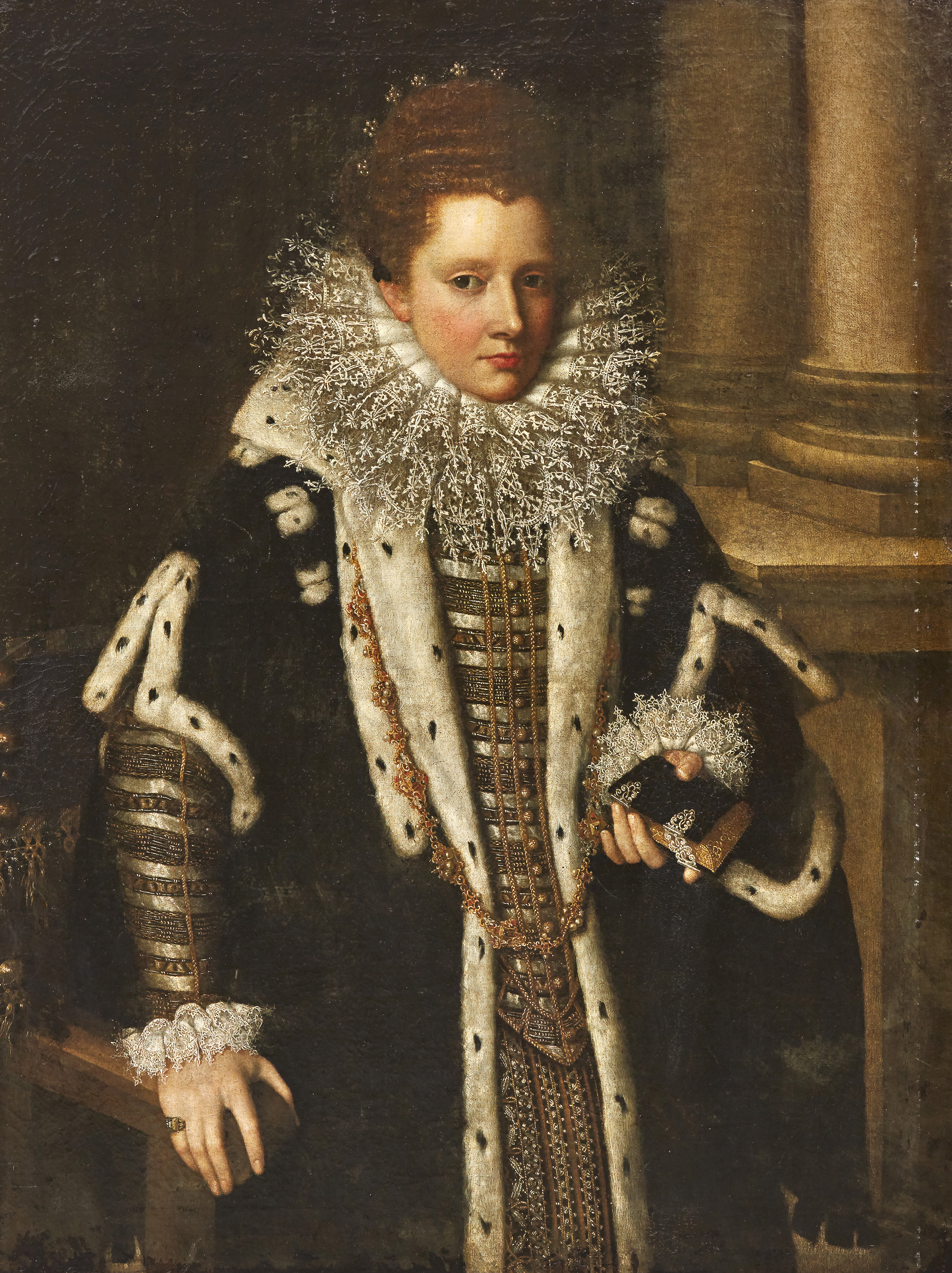
- 1594 portrait by Lavinia Fontana
- Born: 1550
- Died: 22 January 1617
- Noble family: Sforza
- Spouse: Giacomo Boncompagni

Costanza Sforza of Santa Fiora (1550 – 22 January 1617) was an Italian noblewoman. By birth she was member of the powerful House of Sforza and by marriage member of the House of Boncompagni.

== Early life ==
Costanza was daughter of Sforza Sforza, 1st Marquess of Castell'Arquato, 11th Count of Santa Fiora (1520 – Castell'Arquato, 21 October 1575), and his first wife Luigia Pallavicino (died in 1552), maternal granddaughter of Jacopo Salviati and wife Lucrezia de' Medici. She was a half-sister of Cardinal Francesco Sforza and paternal granddaughter of Costanza Farnese (daughter of Alessandro Farnese, later Pope Paul III). She married Don Giacomo Boncompagni, 1st Marquess of Vignola, and 1st Duke of Sora, Aquino, Arce and Arpino, on 5 February 1576, and had fourteen children.

Lavinia Fontana, a prominent Bolognese artist, painted her portrait in 1594. A year later, Constanza served as the namesake and godmother of Fontana's daughter.

== Issue ==
She was the mother of twelve children.

- Scolastica (1577 – 9 May 1647), a nun at the convent of San Paolo in Milan;
- Camilla (30 September 1579 – October 1588);
- Giovanna (died in early childhood);
- Veronica (1584 – 23 November 1609), a nun at the convent of San Paolo in Milan;
- Giulia (1586 – 4 April 1622), married Giovanni de Guevara, 2nd Duke of Bovino (died 30 January 1631), in 1605;
- Ugo (22 January 1587 – 19 April 1602), Marquis of Vignola;
- Sforza (10 November 1588 – 1589);
- Gregorio (1590 – 1628), succeeded his father;
- Camilla (1591 – 15 January 1631), a nun at the convent of Santa Cecilia in Rome;
- Sforza (27 December 1592 – 10 January 1669);
- Giovanni (28 September 1594 – 13 May 1634);
- Francesco (1596 – 1641), a cardinal.
