= Ippolita Ludovisi =

Ippolita I Ludovisi
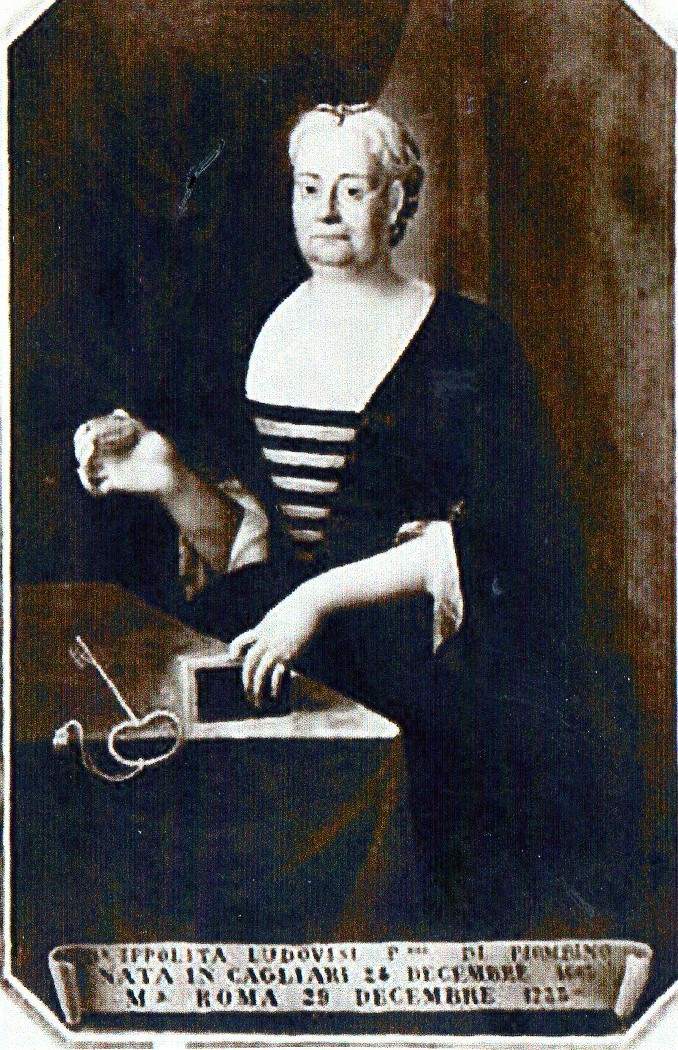

Princess of Piombino
- Reign: 27 January 1701–29 December 1733
- Predecessor: Olimpia Ludovisi
- Successor: Maria Eleonora I Boncompagni
- Born: 24 December 1663; Cagliari
- Died: 29 December 1733 (aged 70); Rome
- Spouse: Gregorio II Boncompagni
- Issue: Ugo Boncompagni-Ludovisi; Maria Eleonora I, Princess of Piombino; Donna Costanza, Princess of Bassano; Maria Teresa, Princess of Palestrina; Maria Giulia, Duchess of Fiano; Anna Maria, Princess of Rocca Massa; Lavinia, Princess of Santo Buono
- House: Ludovisi
- Father: Niccolò I Ludovisi
- Mother: Constanza Pamphili, Princess of San Martino and Alviano

Ippolita I Ludovisi (Cagliari, 24 December 1663 – Rome, 29 December 1733) was the Princess of Piombino, Marchioness of Populonia, Princess of Venosa and Countess of Conza, Lady di Scarlino, Populonia, Vignale, Abbadia del Fango, Suvereto, Buriano, Cerboli e Palmaiolan, and Lady princess of the Tuscan Archipelago including the islands of Elba, Montecristo, Pianosa, Gorgona, Capraia, and Isola del Giglio from 1701 until her death in 1733.

== Life ==
She was the youngest daughter of Niccolò I Ludovisi, Prince of Piombino, etc, nephew of Pope Gregory XV, and third wife Constanza Pamphili, Princess of San Martino and Alviano, sister of Camillo Francesco Maria Pamphili, 1st Prince of San Martino al Cimino and Valmontone, and niece of Pope Innocent X.

In Rome on 19 October 1681 she married Don Gregorio II Boncompagni (Sora, 7 July 1642 – Rome, 1 January/February 1707), 5th Duke of Sora, Aquino, Arce and Arpino and 6th Marquess of Vignola and Prince Consort of Piombino, etc, great-great-grandson of Pope Gregory XIII.

On 27 November 1700, Olimpia died. On 27 January 1701, Ippolita inherited the family fiefs from her sister Olimpia, including Piombino.

Ippolita outlived her only first born son, but was outlived by her six daughters. The Principality of Piombino was then inherited by the members of the Boncompagni family, through her eldest daughter Maria Eleonora.

== Issue ==
- Don Ugo Boncompagni-Ludovisi (6 March 1684 – 1686)
- Donna Maria Eleonora I Boncompagni-Ludovisi (Isola di Sora, 10 April 1686 - Rome, 5 January 1745), Princess of Piombino, etc, married on 29 March 1702 her paternal uncle, Gregorio's brother Don Antonio I Boncompagni-Ludovisi (Isola di Sora, 10 April 1658 - Isola di Sora, 28 January 1731), 6th Duke of Sora, Aquino, Arce and Arpino, 7th Marquess of Vignola, Prince Consort of Piombino, etc, Knight of the Order of the Golden Fleece in 1702 by Brevet Nr. 0629, and had issue
- Donna Costanza Boncompagni-Ludovisi (Isola di Sora, 6 September 1687 – 6 February 1768), married in 1705 or on 5 April 1706 Vincenzo Giustiniani, 3rd Prince of Bassano (Rome, 30 August 1673 - 16 March 1754), and had issue
- Donna Maria Teresa Boncompagni-Ludovisi (27 February 1692 – 7 June 1744), married in 1714/1716 as his third wife Urbano Barberini, 3rd Prince of Palestrina (1664 - 27 September 1722), great-grandnephew of Pope Urban VIII, and had female issue
- Donna Maria Giulia Boncompagni-Ludovisi (Rome, 22 January 1695 – 3 November 1751), married in 1714 as his second wife Marco Ottoboni, 1st Duke of Fiano in 1690 (Venice, 23 March 1656 - Rome, 13 April 1723), nephew of Pope Alexander VIII, and had female issue
- Donna Anna Maria Boncompagni-Ludovisi (21/31 January 1696 – 11/12 January 1752), married in Rome on 17 August 1719 Don Gian Vincenzo Salviati, Prince of Rocca Massa, Duke of Giuliano, Marquess of Montieri, Grandee of Spain 1st Class (2 February 1693 - 3 September 1752), and had issue
- Donna Lavinia Boncompagni-Ludovisi (22 December 1697 - 20 April 1773), married in Rome on 4 July 1723 Don Marino Caracciolo, 6th Prince of Santo Buono (22 February 1696 - 1 July 1745/1747), and had issue

Preceded by Olimpia Ludovisi	Princess of Piombino; 1701–1733	Succeeded by Maria Eleonora I Boncompagni
