= Gaetano I Boncompagni Ludovisi =

Gaetano I
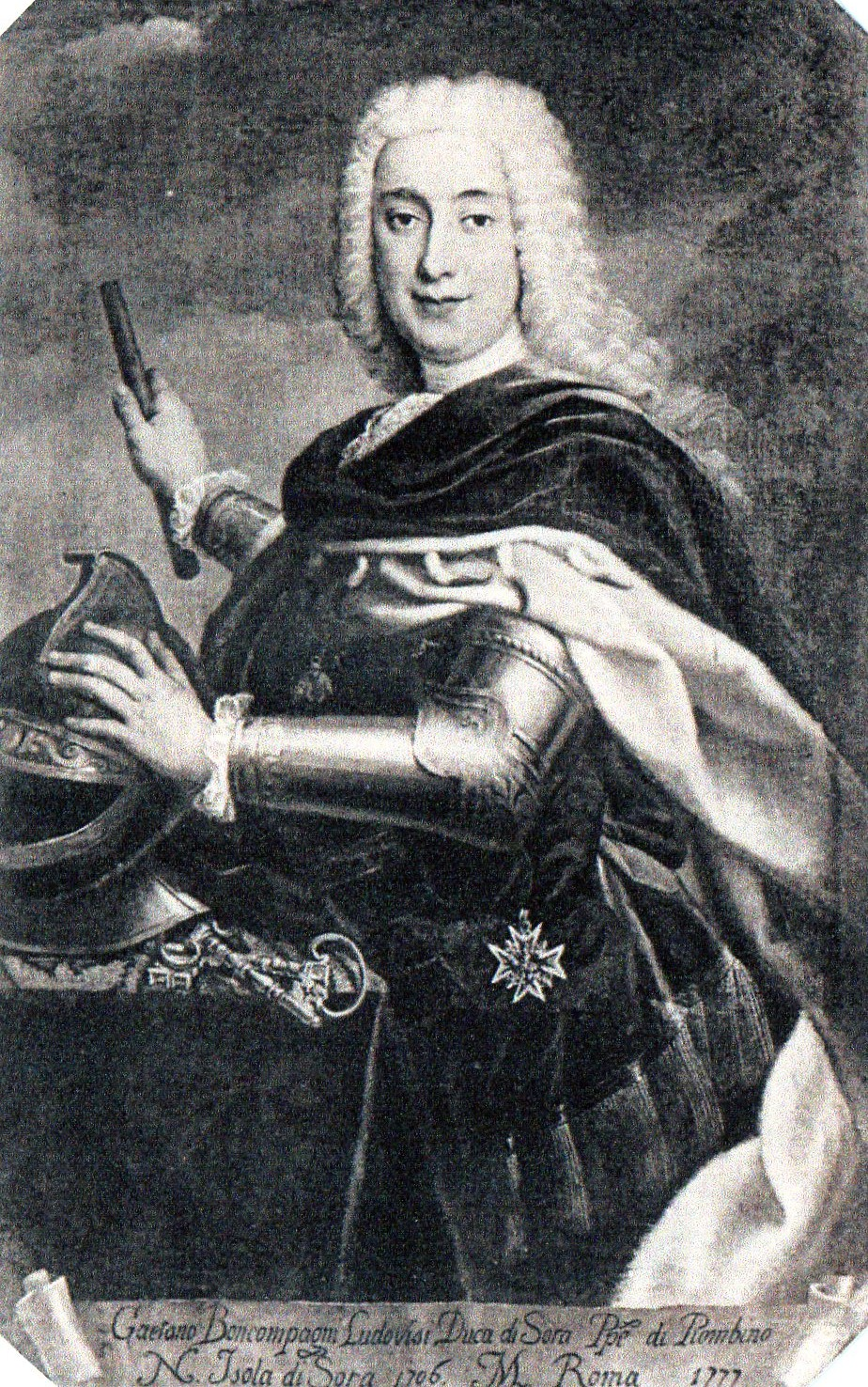
- circa 1777

Prince of Piombino
- Reign: 1745–1777
- Predecessor: Maria Eleonora I Boncompagni
- Successor: Antonio II Boncompagni Ludovisi

7th Duke of Sora
- Reign: 1731–1777
- Predecessor: Antonio I Boncompagni
- Successor: Antonio II Boncompagni Ludovisi
- Born: 1706
- Died: 1777 (aged 70–71); Rome, Papal States
- Spouse: Laura Chigi
- Issue: Maria Teresa Marianna, Duchess of Termoli; Maddalena; Antonio II; Giacomo; Francesco; Ignazio; Ippolita
- House: Boncompagni
- Father: Antonio I Boncompagni
- Mother: Maria Eleonora I Boncompagni

Gaetano I Boncompagni Ludovisi (1706–1777) was VII Duke of Sora and the Prince of Piombino, Marquis of Populonia, Prince of Venosa and Count of Conza, Lord di Scarlino, Populonia, Vignale, Abbadia del Fango, Suvereto, Buriano, Cerboli e Palmaiolan, and Lord prince of the Tuscan Archipelago including the islands of Elba, Montecristo, Pianosa, Gorgona, Capraia, and Isola del Giglio, from 1745 until 1777.

== Biography ==
He was the eldest son of Antonio I Boncompagni (1658–1731), VI Duke of Sora and Maria Eleonora I Boncompagni (1686–1745), and inherited the titles of both his parents.

A declared supporter of the Spanish claims on Naples, just as his father had been, when Charles of Bourbon reconquered the Kingdom of Naples in 1734 during the War of the Polish Succession, Boncompagni was naturally to emerge as one of the most important characters of the new Kingdom of Naples. When Charles of Bourbon made his official entry into Naples, Boncompagni was designated, together with the prince of Centola and representing the Neapolitan nobility, to present the keys of the city to the new sovereign.
In the same year, he was appointed Field marshal and Gentleman of the chamber of the King. The following year, he was chosen as the first Neapolitan ambassador to the court of Spain.

For his diplomatic assignment, to which he had been enticed with the considerable sum of 1,500 ducats a month, Gaetano left Naples on 18 January 1735, arriving at the Spanish court on the following 2 September. Despite the magnificence with which this appointment took place, given the relations of subjection of the Neapolitan politics and diplomacy to that of Madrid, Gaetano's assignment had very little relevance beyond a simple homage from the new King of Naples to his parents in Madrid. King Philip V of Spain awarded him the Order of the Golden Fleece in 1736, and on 20 October of the following year, Gaetano was recalled to his homeland.

In 1737, on the occasion of the wedding between Charles III of Bourbon and Princess Maria Amalia of Saxony, he was appointed Mayordomo mayor to the new Queen. Gaetano was able to ingratiate himself with the new Queen, who supported him in the fight against the Spanish First Secretaries of State of the Kingdom, who tried to subject the traditional Neapolitan aristocracy to the dictates of the Spanish court. He was made a Knight of the Order of San Gennaro and on 22 May 1739, Philip V established the title of Grandee of Spain on the Duchy of Sora in favour of Boncompagni and his descendants.

In 1746, a new court intrigue headed by Boncompagni produced the fall of First Secretary of State José Joaquín de Montealegre. His influence at the court had become even greater, but the hostility of Charles of Bourbon's ministers against him also increased. The latter's trust in him had progressively decreased due to Boncompagni's attitude during the negotiations of the concordat with Rome. Linked by family interests with various figures in the Curia, but above all a man of intransigent religious sentiments (Bernardo Tanucci called him a "bigot"), he opposed as much as he could to the jurisdictional guidelines of the Neapolitan government led by Tanucci, going so far as to appeal to Spain against the decisions taken by Charles's ministers and approved by the King himself.

This led to his downfall and resignation as Mayordomo Mayor. Boncompagni retired to Rome, where he opposed, together with Cardinal Torrigiani the measures taken by the Spanish and Neapolitan courts, against the Jesuit order. He died in Rome in 1777.

=== Marriage and children ===
Gaetano married in 1726 Laura Chigi (1707-1792), daughter of Prince Augusto, with whom he had seven children:

- Maria Teresa Marianna (1730-1812), court lady of Queen Maria Carolina of Spain, married Francesco Cattaneo, Duke of Termoli.
- Maddalena
- Antonio (1735-1801), succeeded his father in his titles and fiefdoms
- Giacomo
- Francesco
- Ignazio (1743-1790), cardinal
- Ippolita (1751-1813), married Prince Abbondio Rezzonico, nephew of Pope Clement XIII.

| Preceded by Maria Eleonora I Boncompagni | Prince of Piombino; 1745–1777 | Succeeded by Antonio II Boncompagni Ludovisi |
| Preceded by Antonio I Boncompagni | Duke of Sora; 1731–1777 | Succeeded by Antonio II Boncompagni Ludovisi |
