= Filippo Guastavillani =

Italian Roman Catholic cardinal

His Eminence Filippo Guastavillani
- Cardinal Deacon of Sant'Eustachio
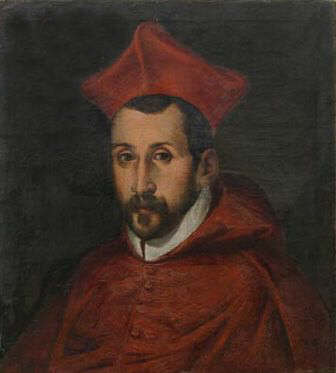
- Church: Catholic Church
- In office: 1587
- Other posts: Camerlengo of the Holy Roman Church, (1584-1587); Commendatory abbot of Nonantola, (1582-1587); Protector of House of Loreto, (1580-1587)
- Previous posts: Cardinal deacon of Sant'Angelo in Pescheria, (1583-1587); Cardinal deacon of Santa Maria in Cosmedin, (1577-1583); Apostolic legate of the March of Ancona, (1578-1580); Cardinal deacon of Santa Maria Nuova, (1574-1577)

Orders
- Created cardinal: July 5, 1574 by Pope Gregory XIII

Personal details
- Born: September 28, 1541 Bologna, Papal States
- Died: August 17, 1587 (aged 45) Rome, Papal States
- Buried: Bologna
- Coat of arms

Filippo Guastavillani (28 September 1541 – 17 August 1587) was an Italian Roman Catholic cardinal.

== Biography ==
Filippo Guastavillani was born in Bologna on 28 September 1541, the son of Bolognese Patricians Angelo Michele Guastavillani and wife as her second husband Giacoma Boncompagni. His siblings were Girolamo Guastavillani, married to Orsina Bentivoglio, relative of her brother-in-law, and had issue, and Isabella Guastavillani, married in 1573 to Protesilao Malvezzi (bap. 22 July 1556 - 23 June 1623), relative of his sister-in-law, and had issue. His mother's siblings were Pope Gregory XIII, Boncompagno Boncompagni (1504 - 1587), married to Cecilia Bargellini (parents of Angela Boncompagni, wife of Girolamo Pepoli, without issue, and Cardinal Filippo Boncompagni), and another married sibling, children of Cristoforo Boncompagni (10 July 1470 – 1546) and wife Angela Marescalchi, and paternal grandchildren of Giacomo Boncompagni and wife Camilla Piattesi.

As a young man, he received the tonsure in Bologna. There, he was a member of the Council of the Forty from 1571 to 1576. He was also Bologna's Gonfaloniere of Justice.

His uncle Pope Gregory XIII made him a cardinal deacon in the consistory of July 5, 1574. He received the red hat and the deaconry of Santa Maria Nova on July 14, 1574. On November 8, 1577, he opted for the deaconry of Santa Maria in Cosmedin. He became the Governor of Spoleto in 1578, and served as the governor of Ancona from October 18, 1578 to 1585. He served as cardinal protector of The Holy House of Loreto from December 11, 1580 until his death. On December 19, 1583, he opted for the deaconry of Sant'Angelo in Pescheria.

He participated in the papal conclave of 1585 that elected Pope Sixtus V. The new pope named him Governor of Montis Castelli Tudertini in 1585. On January 7, 1587, Cardinal Guastavillani opted for the deaconry of Sant'Eustachio. He was the Camerlengo of the Holy Roman Church from May 14, 1584 until his death. He was also Governor of Bologna and Ferrara.

He died in Rome on August 17, 1587. He was initially buried in Santi Apostoli. The next year, his remains were transferred to Bologna and buried in the Church of San Francesco.

== Sources ==
- Borromeo, Agostino (2002). "Gregory XIII". In Levillain, Philippe (ed.). The Papacy: An Encyclopedia. Vol. II: Gaius-Proxies. Routledge. pp. 663–665.
