= Maria Eleonora I Boncompagni =

Maria Eleonora I

Princess of Piombino
- Reign: 1733–1745
- Predecessor: Ippolita Ludovisi
- Successor: Gaetano I Boncompagni Ludovisi
- Born: 1686
- Died: 1745 (aged 58–59)
- Spouse: Antonio I Boncompagni
- Issue: Maria Olimpia; Niccolo; Francesca Cecilia; Gaetano I Pietro Gregorio
- House: Boncompagni
- Father: Gregorio II Boncompagni
- Mother: Ippolita Ludovisi

Maria Eleonora I Boncompagni (1686–1745) was the Princess of Piombino, Marchioness of Populonia, Princess of Venosa and Countess of Conza, Lady di Scarlino, Populonia, Vignale, Abbadia del Fango, Suvereto, Buriano, Cerboli e Palmaiolan, and Lady princess of the Tuscan Archipelago including the islands of Elba, Montecristo, Pianosa, Gorgona, Capraia, and Isola del Giglio, from 1733 until her death.

== Biography ==
She was the oldest of six daughters to her mother Ippolita Ludovisi and father Gregorio II Boncompagni.

She succeeded her mother as sovereign at her death in 1733.

She was married to her uncle, Don Antonio I Boncompagni (1658–1731), VI Duke of Sora, who became Prince of Piombino by the right of his wife.
They had 5 children :

- Maria Olimpia (1703-05),
- Niccolo (1704-09),
- Francesca Cecilia (1705-75), married Francesco Maria Carafa, IV principe di Belvedere,
- Gaetano (1706-1777), their successor,
- Pietro Gregorio (1709-1747), married Maria Francesca Ottoboni, II Duchess of Fiano.

Preceded by Ippolita Ludovisi	Princess of Piombino; 1733–1745	Succeeded by Gaetano Boncompagni-Ludovisi
