= Fernando de Toledo Oropesa =

Fernando de Toledo Oropesa (1520–1590) was a Spanish Roman Catholic priest who was made a cardinal but who refused the honor.

== Biography ==
Fernando de Toledo Oropesa was born in Spain in 1520, the son of Luis de Toledo y Pacheco and Inés Duque Estrada. A noble family, they were related to the counts of Oropesa and to Cardinal Juan Álvarez de Toledo.

He studied at the University of Salamanca. While there, he became friends with Juan de Ribera. After university, he was ordained as a priest.

The King of Spain offered him several ecclesiastical posts, but Toledo refused them all. He was appointed president of the Royal Audiencia of Lima; he initially accepted this position, but then reconsidered and declined to travel to the Viceroyalty of Peru. Instead, he remained in Spain and dedicated himself to preaching, hearing confessions, and assisting the sick and poor.

Upon the insistence of Philip II of Spain, Pope Gregory XIII made him a cardinal in the consistory of 21 February 1578. The nuncio in Spain, Cardinal Filippo Sega communicated the king's thanks to the pope on 13 March 1578, but then on 5 May reported that Toledo had declined the appointment. The pope and the king agreed that Sega could convey the biretta to Toledo on the assumption that Toledo could be prevailed upon to accept the appointment. However, Toledo refused repeatedly, and on 4 July 1578 the pope accepted Toledo's refusal and withdrew his creation, complaining to Philip II that the king had insisted he make a cardinal of someone who would refuse the honor. The king replied that he never imagined any of his subjects would refuse a cardinalate.

Toledo continued his priestly duties until his death. He died in Oropesa in 1590, in the middle of giving a sermon. He was buried in the monastery of the Immaculate Conception in Oropesa.
