= Antonio II Boncompagni Ludovisi =

Antonio II
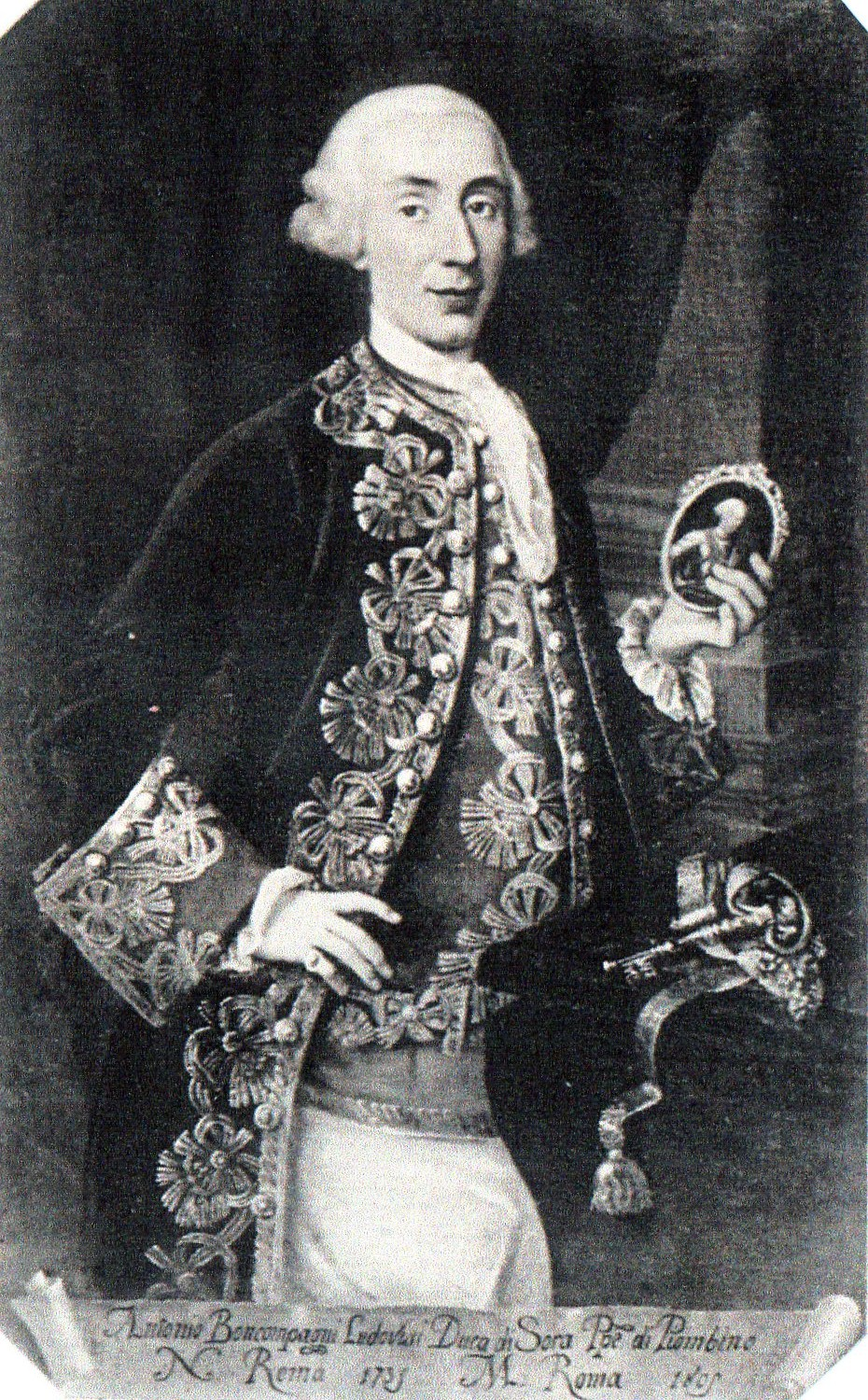
- 18th century

Prince of Piombino
- Reign: 1777–26 April 1805
- Predecessor: Gaetano I
- Successor: Elisa Bonaparte as Princess of Lucca and Piombino

8th Duke of Sora
- Reign: 1777–1801
- Predecessor: Gaetano I
- Born: 15 January/16 June 1735; Rome, Papal States
- Died: 26 April 1805; Rome, Papal States
- Spouse: Maria Giacinta Orsini; Maria Vittoria Sforza-Cesarini
- Issue: Anna-Eleonora; Luigi I, Prince of Piombino
- House: Boncompagni
- Father: Gaetano Boncompagni-Ludovisi
- Mother: Laura Chigi

Don Antonio II Boncompagni-Ludovisi, then Prince Boncompagni-Ludovisi (Rome, 15 January/16 June 1735 – Rome, 26 April 1805), was the 8th Duke of Sora, Aquino, Arce and Arpino and 9th Marquess of Vignola and the Prince of Piombino, Marquis of Populonia, Prince of Venosa and Count of Conza, Lord di Scarlino, Populonia, Vignale, Abbadia del Fango, Suvereto, Buriano, Cerboli e Palmaiolan, and Lord prince of the Tuscan Archipelago including the islands of Elba, Montecristo, Pianosa, Gorgona, Capraia, and Isola del Giglio, from 1733 until he ceded the duchy in 1796 and was deposed in the principality on 21 March 1801 and in the marquessate during the Napoleonic Wars.

He was the eldest son of Don Gaetano I Boncompagni Ludovisi, Prince of Piombino and Duke of Sora, and Laura Chigi of the Princes of Farnese.

== Marriages and issue ==
Antonio married firstly, in Rome on 25 April 1757, Maria Giacinta Orsini, daughter of Domenico Orsini, 15th Duke of Gravina and Anna Paola Flaminia Odescalchi. They had no children.

Antonio married secondly, in Rome on 25 November 1761, Maria Vittoria Sforza-Cesarini, daughter of Sforza Giuseppe I Sforza-Cesarini, 3rd Prince of Genzano, 20th Count of Santa Fiora, and Maria Francesca Giustiniani. They had:

- Donna Anna-Eleonora, Princess Boncompagni-Ludovisi (5 March 1763 - 1767)
- Don Ludovico/Luigi I Maria, Prince Boncompagni-Ludovisi, Prince of Piombino, Duke of Sora, etc, married on 24 November 1796, Maddalena, daughter of Baldassarre Odescalchi, 4th Prince Odescalchi, Duke of Syrmia/Sirmio, Duke of Bracciano, Duke of Ceri.

Preceded by Gaetano Boncompagni-Ludovisi	Duke of Sora; 1777–1801	Succeeded by title abolished
Preceded by Gaetano Boncompagni-Ludovisi	Prince of Piombino; 1777–1805	Succeeded by Elisa Bonaparte (as Princess of Lucca and Piombino)
