= Ludovico Spada Veralli Potenziani =

Italian nobleman (1880–1971)

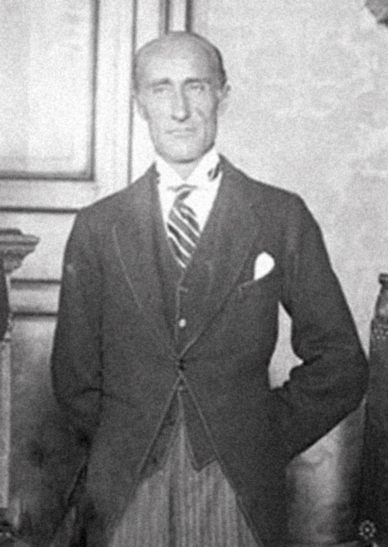
Ludovico Spada Veralli Potenziani

Prince Ludovico Spada Veralli Potenziani (19 August 1880 – 8 August 1971) was an Italian nobleman. He was born in Rieti. He was the 2nd fascist governor of Rome (1926–1928). He served in the Senate of the Kingdom of Italy. He died in Rome, Italy.

In 1928 he had the honour of a ticker-tape parade in New York.

Preceded by Filippo Cremonesi	Governor of Rome; 1926–1928	Succeeded by Francesco Boncompagni Ludovisi
