= Antonio I Boncompagni =

Antonio I
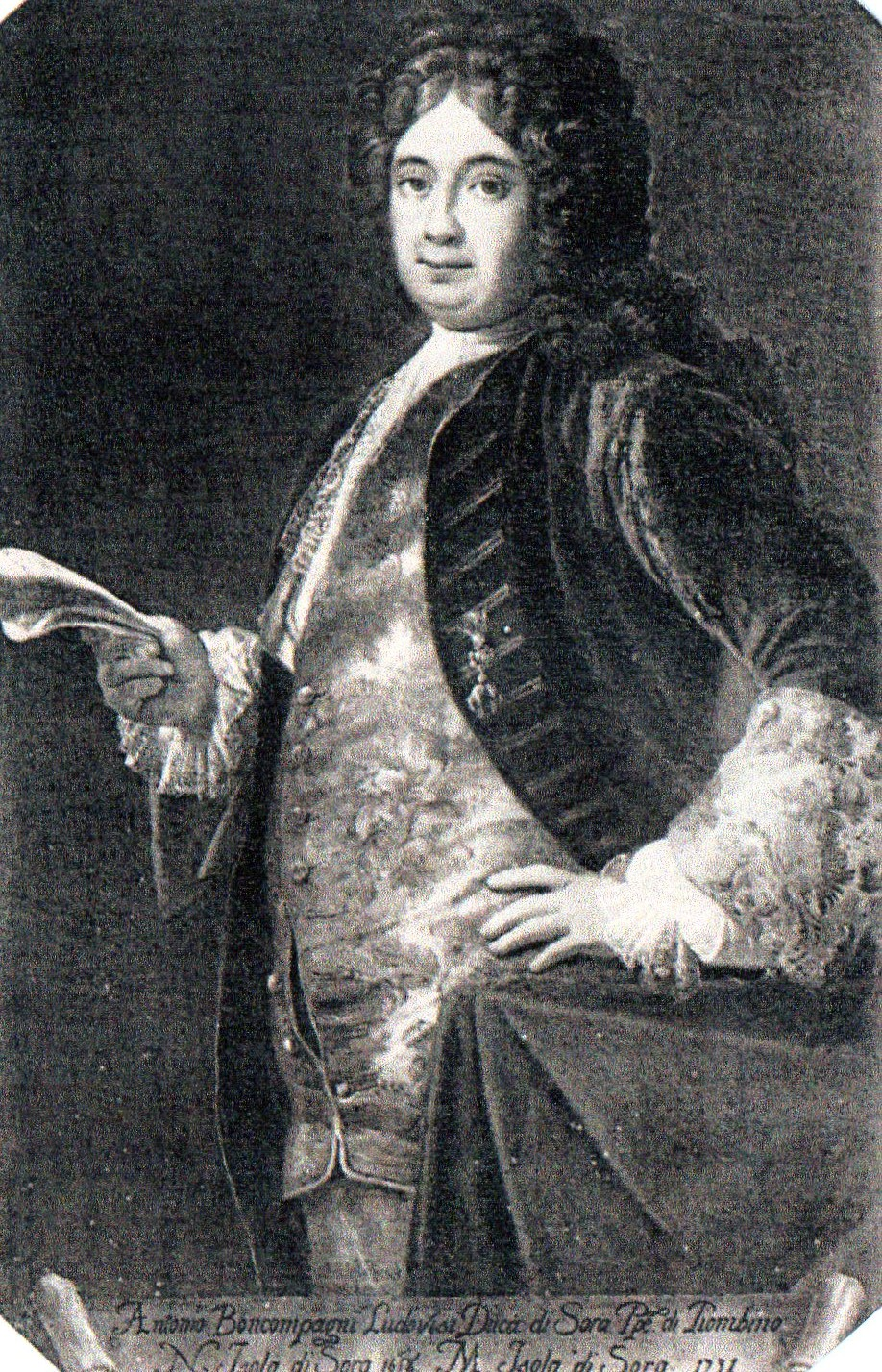

6th Duke of Sora
- Reign: January 1707–28 January 1731
- Predecessor: Gregorio II Boncompagni
- Successor: Gaetano I Boncompagni Ludovisi

Prince-Consort of Piombino
- Reign: 1701–28 January 1731
- Born: 10 April 1658
- Died: 28 January 1731 (aged 72); Isola del Liri
- Spouse: Maria Eleonora I Boncompagni
- Issue: Maria Olimpia; Niccolo; Francesca Cecilia; Gaetano I Pietro Gregorio
- House: Boncompagni
- Father: Ugo I, 4th Duke of Sora
- Mother: Maria Ruffo di Bagnara

Antonio I Boncompagni (10 April 1658 – 28 January 1731) was an Italian nobleman and the 6th Duke of Sora. By his marriage, he also was Prince-Consort of Piombino.

== Biography ==
He was the fourth son of Ugo, 4th Duke of Sora and Duchess Maria Ruffo di Bagnara. He grew up in the shadow of his three elder brothers, and was not expected to succeed his father. But when his eldest brother Gregorio only had daughters, and the two other brothers became clerics, it was decided in 1701 that Antonio would marry his brother's eldest daughter Maria Eleonora, to succeed his brother.

Antonio and Maria Eleonora had five children:

- Maria Olimpia (1703–1705)
- Niccolo (1704–1709)
- Francesca Cecilia (1705–1775), married Francesco Maria Carafa, IV principe di Belvedere
- Gaetano (1706–1777), their successor
- Pietro Gregorio (1709–1747), married Maria Francesca Ottoboni, II Duchess of Fiano

Indeed, his brother died in January 1707, and Antonio became the next Duke of Sora.

But he had attracted widespread attention before in 1701. After the failure of the Conspiracy of Macchia, the conspirators fled the Kingdom of Naples towards the Papal States. One of these, Giambattista di Capua, prince Della Riccia, had ventured into the fiefdoms of the Boncompagni, with whom he was related, finding a night refuge in a small church near Isola di Sora. As soon as Antonio heard of this news, he gave immediate orders to arrest the prince, despite the blood ties that united them and the violation of the sacred right of asylum in a church. The prince was sent back to Naples where he was imprisoned in Castel dell'Ovo.

At the time, the episode caused a considerable stir, attracting the ire of the pro-Austrians and the applause of the pro-Spanish Italians. The Pope even threatened Antonio with a solemn excommunication. The story of Antonio and Prince Della Riccia also reached the ears of King Philip V of Spain who, intending to exploit this episode for his own propaganda, decided to publicly reward Boncompagni by creating him Grand Seneschal of the Kingdom of Naples and in 1702 awarded him with the Order of the Golden Fleece. In 1707 he also made him commander of a company of cavalry.

His fortune turned when the Austrians conquered Naples during and after the War of Spanish Succession. His pro-Spanish reputation excluded him from taking an active part in the social, court or political life of the Kingdom. Antonio I decided to live the rest of his life in his fiefdom of Sora, working hard for the implementation of the local fiber processing and weaving industry, especially in Isola del Liri and Arpino, establishing commercial routes with the Papal States.

He died in Isola del Liri on 28 January 1731, three years before the return of the Spaniards as rulers of Naples.

Preceded by Gregorio II Boncompagni	Duke of Sora; 1707–1731	Succeeded by Gaetano I Boncompagni Ludovisi
