= Gregorio II Boncompagni =

Italian noble

- 5th Duke of Sora

Duke of Sora
- Predecessor: Ugo Boncompagni, 4th Duke of Sora
- Born: July 7, 1642
- Died: January 1, 1707 (aged 64)
- Noble family: Boncompagni
- Spouses: Giustina Gallio (m. ?–11679); Ippolita Ludovisi (m. 1681–1707)
- Issue: Hugo Boncompagni; Maria Eleonora, Princess of Piombino; Constance Boncompagni; Maria Teresa Boncompagni; Giulia Boncompagni; Anna Maria Boncompagni
- Father: Ugo Boncompagni, 4th Duke of Sora
- Mother: Maria Ruffo di Bagnara

Gregorio II Boncompagni (7 July 1642 – 1 January 1707) was an Italian nobleman and the 5th Duke of Sora. He was the great-grandson of Pope Gregory XIII

== Biography ==
He was the eldest son of Ugo, 4th Duke of Sora and Duchess Maria Ruffo di Bagnara.

He married Giustina Gallio (29 October 1644 – 21 July 1679) and then, when she died, he married Ippolita Ludovisi on 19 October 1681. The Boncompagni-Ludovisi union lasted until the French Revolution and included the development of the Archivio Boncompagni-Ludovisi held by The Vatican.

Gregorio and Ippolita had six children:

- Hugo (1684–1686) died young
- Maria Eleonora (1686–1745), Princess of Piombino, married her uncle and Gregorio's brother Antonio I Boncompagni
- Constance (1687–1768), married Vincenzo Giustiniani, Prince of Bassano
- Maria Teresa (1692–1744), married Urbano Barberini, Prince of Palestrina
- Giulia (1695–1751), married Marco Ottoboni, Duke of Fiano
- Anna Maria (1696–1752), married Gian Vincenzo Salviati, Duke of Giuliano

Preceded by Ugo I Boncompagni	Duke of Sora; 1676–1707	Succeeded by Antonio I Boncompagni
