= Giacomo Boncompagni =

Illegitimate son of Pope Gregory XIII

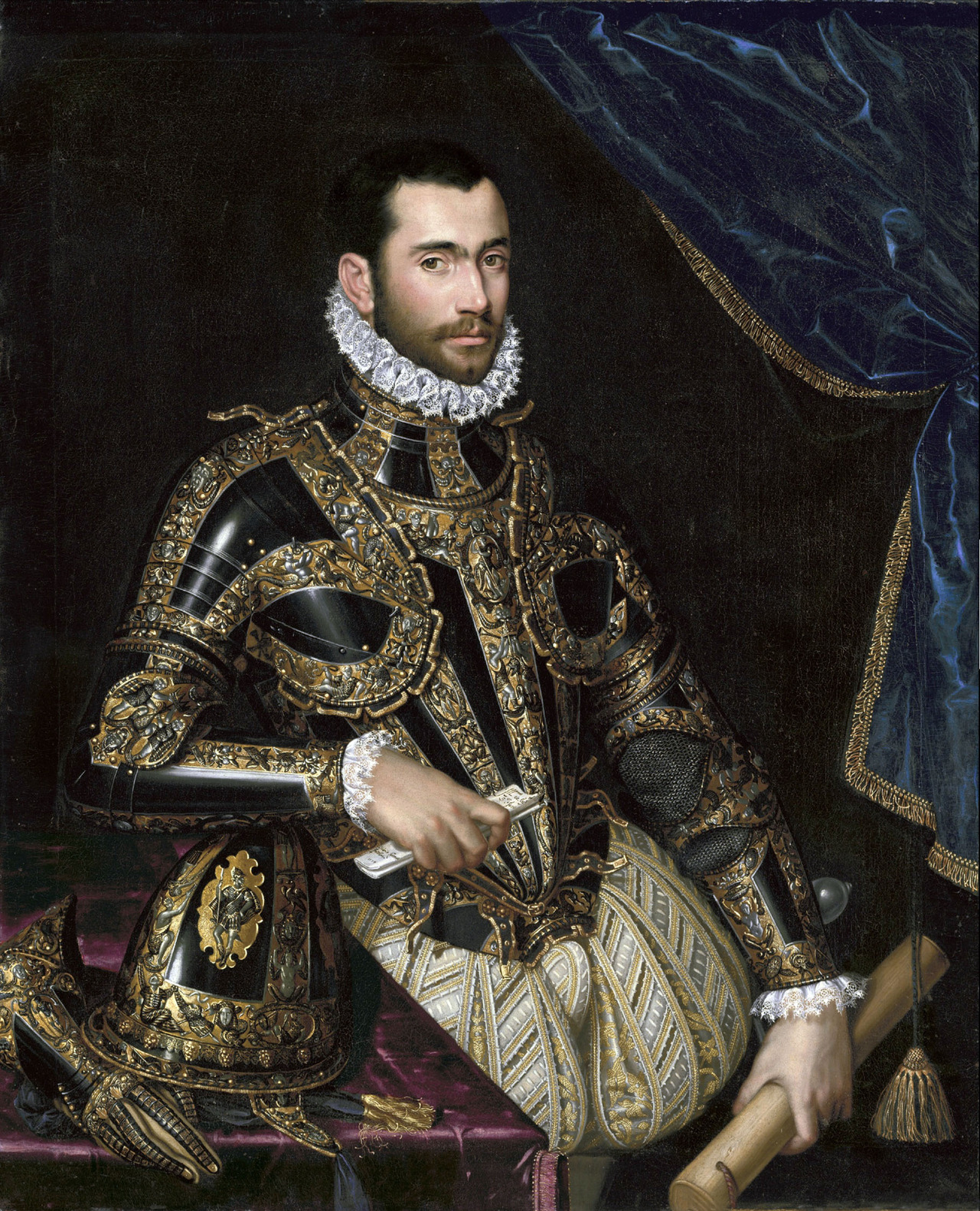
- Born: 8 May 1548
- Died: 18 August 1612 (aged 64)
- Spouse: Costanza Sforza
- Parent(s): Pope Gregory XIII; Maddalena Fulchini

Giacomo Boncompagni (also Jacopo Boncompagni; 8 May 1548 – 18 August 1612) was an Italian feudal lord of the 16th century, the illegitimate son of Pope Gregory XIII (Ugo Boncompagni). He was also Duke of Sora, Aquino, Arce and Arpino, and Marquess of Vignola.

A member of the Boncompagni family, he was a patron of arts and culture. Pierluigi da Palestrina dedicated to him the first book of Madrigals. He was also a friend of another composer, Vincenzo Ruffo. He was also a lover of the theatre and of chess.

== Early years ==
Giacomo Boncompagni was born in Bologna, the son of Ugo Boncompagni and his mistress from Carpi, Maddalena Fulchini. His father was in that city to participate in the Council of Trent during the period in which it had been moved there. He was legitimated on 5 July 1548 and entrusted to the Jesuits for education.

When his father was elected pope in March 1572, Giacomo moved to Rome where, two months later, he was appointed castellan of Castel Sant'Angelo. He had an illegitimate child with Beatrice de Garze, a Spaniard, who was baptized as Gironomo on 27 February 1573 in Rome and whose godparents were Ferdinando I, Grand Duke of Tuscany, then a Cardinal, and his sister Isabella de Medici. Later his father named him also Gonfalonier of the Church (leader of the Papal Army), and he moved first to Ancona and then Ferrara, remaining in the latter until 1574. The following year Philip II of Spain named him Capitano Generale delle genti in armi (commander-in-chief) of the Spanish-controlled Duchy of Milan.

During the second Desmond rebellion in Ireland, led by James FitzMaurice FitzGerald, against the Protestant regime of Elizabeth I, Giacomo was proposed as King of Ireland if the Catholic faith were restored to dominance there.

In 1576, Gregory XIII named him governor of Fermo. In the same year, Giacomo married Costanza Sforza of Santa Fiora, who gave him 14 children. In 1581, together with Latino Orsini, he received the task to counter the banditism movement in the Papal States.

== Duke of Sora ==
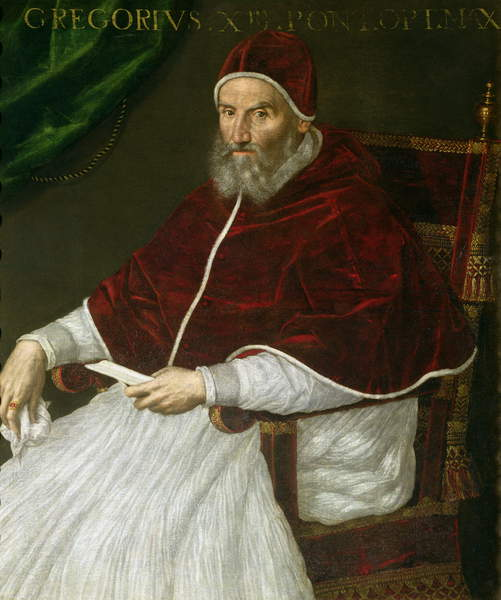
Giacomo's father, Pope Gregory XIII.

Despite all the political and military charges he had been able to assign to his son, Gregory aimed to carve out for him a true state. After a failed attempt at the acquisition of the Marquisate of Saluzzo in 1577, in the same year the pope paid 70,000 gold scudi for the small Marquisate of Vignola to Alfonso II d'Este. Two years later it was the turn of the larger Duchy of Sora and Arce, for which the pope and Giacomo paid 100,000 gold scudi to Francesco Maria II of Urbino.

In 1583, in exchange for another 243,000 gold scudi, Giacomo acquired also the large Duchy of Aquino and Arpino in the Kingdom of Naples, bought from the D'Avalos family. When Gregory died, Boncompagni was the most powerful man in central Italy, in command of 2,000 infantry and some light cavalry, and took on the task of pacifying the situation during the sede vacante period. However, following the election of Sixtus V, he was stripped of all his offices in the Papal States.

Philip II forced Boncompagni also to remain in Milan, while his family moved to Isola di Sora, near Sora, where his wife administered the Duchy. He was able to leave Milan only in 1612: but he was already ill, and died at Sora in the following August, at the age of 64.

His son Gregorio succeeded him in Sora.

== See also ==
- Duchy of Sora

Italian nobility
Preceded by Francesco Maria II della Rovere	Duke of Sora; 1579–1612	Succeeded by Gregorio I Boncompagni
