= Baldassarre Boncompagni =

Italian historian of mathematics and aristocrat (1821–1894)

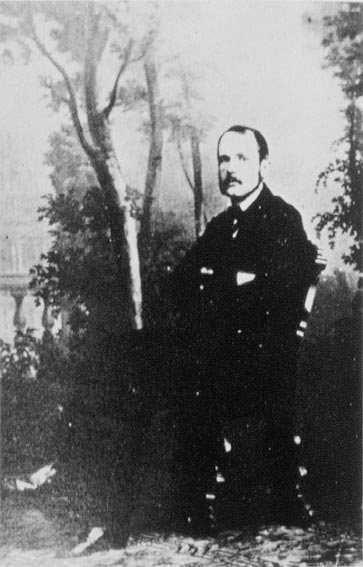
- Baldassarre Boncompagni
- Born: 10 May 1821; Rome, Papal States (now Italy)
- Died: 13 April 1894 (aged 72); Rome, Kingdom of Italy
- Occupations: Mathematician; Historian of mathematics
- Known for: Bullettino di bibliografia e di storia delle scienze matematiche e fisiche

Prince Baldassarre Boncompagni-Ludovisi (10 May 1821 – 13 April 1894), was an Italian historian of mathematics and aristocrat. Considered the founder of the Italian school for the history of mathematics, Boncompagni was one of the most prominent figures in the field in the second half of the nineteenth century. He is best known for his extensive research and publications on the transmission of mathematical knowledge from the Arab world to Christian Europe, with a particular focus on medieval scholars and mathematicians.

== Biography ==
Boncompagni was born in Rome, into an ancient noble and wealthy Roman family, the Ludovisi-Boncompagni, as the third son of Prince Luigi Boncompagni Ludovisi and Princess Maria Maddalena Odescalchi. He studied under the mathematician Barnaba Tortolini and astronomer Ignazio Calandrelli, developing an interest in the history of science. In 1847 Pope Pius IX appointed him a member of the Accademia dei Lincei. Between 1850 and 1862 he produced studies on mathematicians of the Middle Ages and in 1868 founded the Bullettino di bibliografia e di storia delle scienze matematiche e fisiche. After the annexation of the Papal States into the Kingdom of Italy (1870), he refused further participation in the new Academy of the Lincei, and did not accept the appointment as Senator of the Kingdom offered by Quintino Sella. He did, however, serve as a member of several other Italian and foreign academies.

Boncompagni edited Bullettino di bibliografia e di storia delle scienze matematiche e fisiche ("The bulletin of bibliography and history of mathematical and physical sciences") (1868–1887), the first Italian periodical entirely dedicated to the history of mathematics. He edited every article that appeared in the journal. He also prepared and published the first modern edition of Fibonacci's Liber Abaci.

== Selected works ==
- "Recherches sur les integrales définies". Journal für die reine und angewandte Mathematik. XXV: 74–96. 1843.
- Intorno ad alcuni avanzamenti della fisica in Italia nei secoli XVI e XVII. Giornale arcadico di scienze, lettere ed arti, 1846, CIX, pagg. 3-48
- Della vita e delle opere di Guido Bonatti, astrologo e astronomo del secolo decimoterzo. Roma, 1851
- Delle versioni fatte da Platone Tiburtino, traduttore del secolo duodecimo. Atti dell'Accademia Pontificia dei Nuovi Lincei, 1850–51, IV, pagg. 247–286
- Della vita e delle opere di Gherardo Cremonese, traduttore del secolo decimosecondo, e di Gherardo da Sabbioneta, astronomo del secolo decimoterzo. Atti dell'Accademia Pontificia dei Nuovi Lincei, 1850–51, IV, pagg. 387–493
- Della vita e delle opere di Leonardo Pisano, matematico del secolo decimoterzo. Atti dell'Accademia Pontificia dei Nuovi lincei, 1851–52, V, pagg. 208–245
- Intorno ad alcune opere di Leonardo Pisano (Roma : tipografia delle belle arti, 1854)
- Opuscoli di Leonardo Pisano, pubblicati da Baldassarre Boncompagni secondo la lezione di un codice della Biblioteca Ambrosiana di Milano, Firenze, 1856
- Trattati d'aritmetica pubblicati da Baldassarre Boncompagni, I, Algoritmi de numero Indorum; II, Ioannis Hispalensis liber Algoritmi de practica arismetice. Roma, 1857
- Scritti di Leonardo Pisano, matematico, pubblicati da Baldassarre Boncompagni. 2 voll., Roma, 1857–62
- Bullettino di bibliografia e di storia delle scienze matematiche e fisiche. Tomi I-XX, Roma, 1868–1887

== Bibliography ==
- Bottazzini, Umberto (2002). "Boncompagni Ludovisi, Baldassarre". In Joseph W. Dauben; Christoph J. Scriba (eds.). Writing the History of Mathematics: Its Historical Development. Basel: Birkhäuser. pp. 368–72. ISBN 978-3764361679.
