= Filippo Boncompagni =

Italian Cardinal

- Archpriest of the Basilica di Santa Maria Maggiore
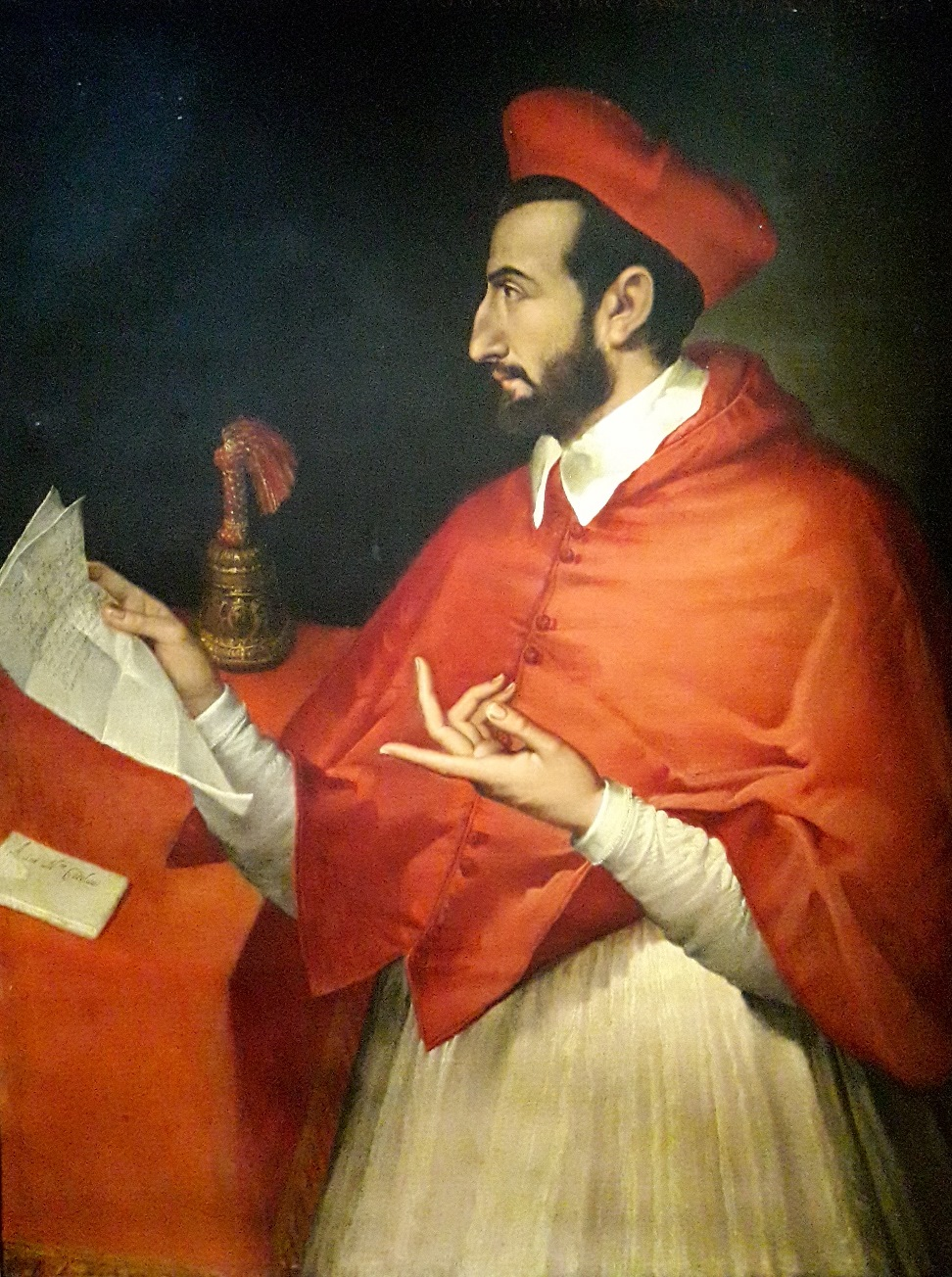
- Church: Catholic Church
- See: Santa Maria Maggiore
- In office: 1581 – 9 June 1586
- Predecessor: Alessandro Sforza
- Successor: Decio Azzolini, Sr.
- Other post: Cardinal-Priest of San Sisto (1572-1586)

Orders
- Created cardinal: 2 June 1572 by Pope Gregory XIII

Personal details
- Born: 7 September 1548 Bologna, Papal States
- Died: 9 June 1586 (aged 37) Rome, Papal States

Filippo Boncompagni (7 September 1548 – 9 June 1586) was an Italian Cardinal, created by Pope Gregory XIII (his uncle) on 2 June 1572.

== Biography ==
Born in Bologna, son of Bolognese Patricians Boncompagno Boncompagni (1504 - 1587) and wife Cecilia Bargellini and brother of Angela Boncompagni, wife of Girolamo Pepoli, without issue. His father was brother of Pope Gregory XIII, Giacoma Boncompagni, married secondly to Angelo Michele Guastavillani (parents of Girolamo Guastavillani, married to Orsina Bentivoglio, relative of her brother-in-law, and had issue, Cardinal Filippo Guastavillani and Isabella Guastavillani, married in 1573 to Protesilao Malvezzi (bap. 22 July 1556 - 23 June 1623), relative of his sister-in-law, and had issue), and another married sibling, children of Cristoforo Boncompagni (10 July 1470 – 1546) and wife Angela Marescalchi, and paternal grandchildren of Giacomo Boncompagni and wife Camilla Piattesi.

He served as superintendent general of the Papal States (Cardinal-Nephew) during his pontificate (1572–85). He occupied several curial offices (grand penitentiary, prefect of the S.C. of the Tridentine Council). He participated in the papal conclave, 1585 as a leader of the cardinals created by Gregory XIII. He was buried in the Liberian Basilica, of which he was archpriest.

== See also ==
- Boncompagni

== Sources ==
- Borromeo, Agostino (2002). "Gregory XIII". In Levillain, Philippe (ed.). The Papacy: An Encyclopedia. Vol. II: Gaius-Proxies. Routledge. pp. 663–665.
