= Duchy of Sora =

1443–1796 Italian state

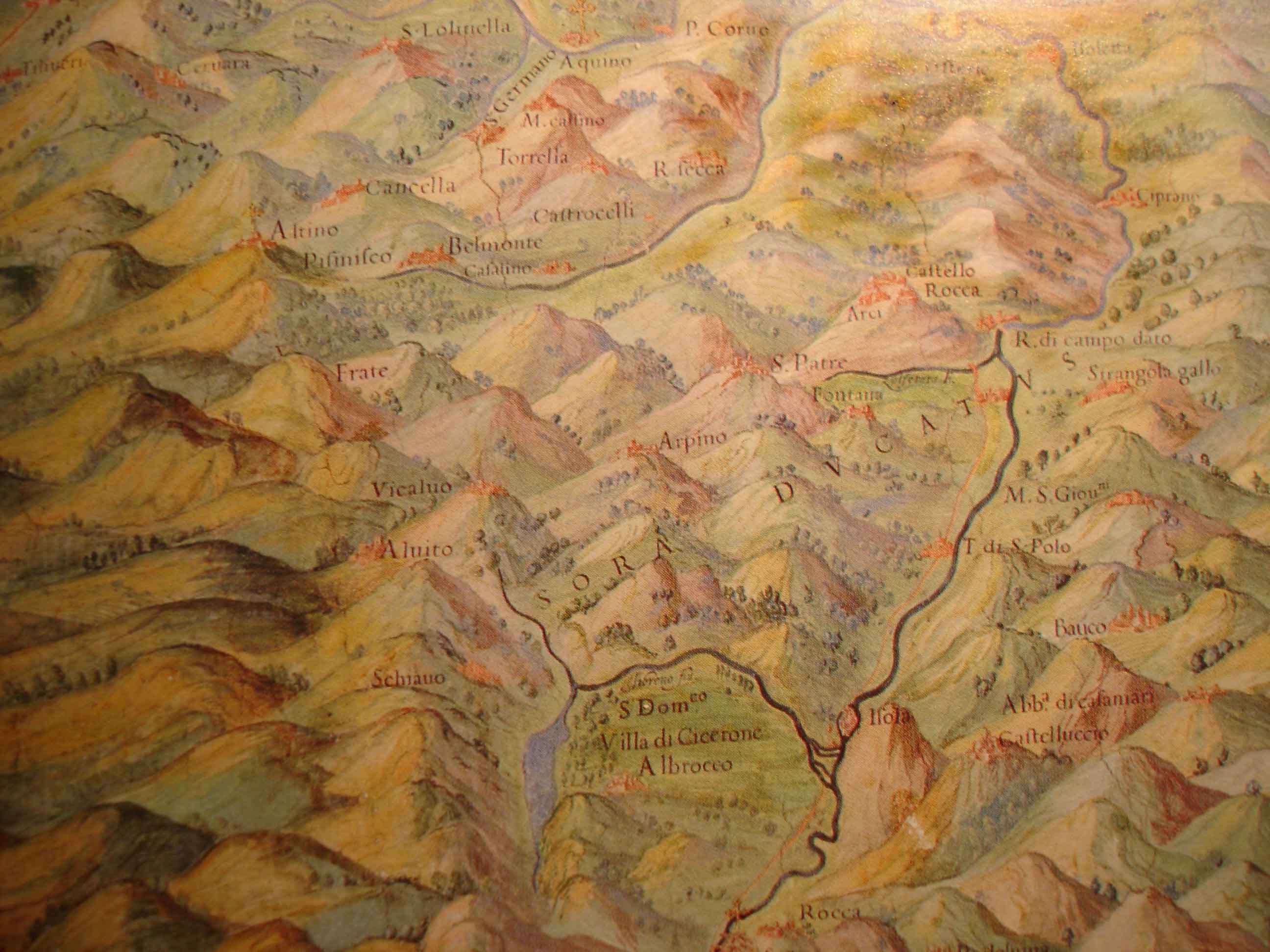
Map of the Duchy of Sora.

The Duchy of Sora was a semi-independent state in Italy, created in 1443 by King Alfonso I of Naples and dissolved in 1796. It occupied the south-eastern part of what is today Lazio, bordering what is now Abruzzo. Its capital was first Sora, and later, under the Boncompagni family, Isola di Sora.

== List of Dukes ==
- Nicola Cantelmo 1443–1454
- Piergiampaolo Cantelmo 1454–1463
- Occupied by the Papal States 1463–1472

=== della Rovere family ===
- Leonardo della Rovere 1472–1475
- Giovanni della Rovere 1475–1501
- Francesco Maria I della Rovere 1501–1516
- William de Croÿ 1516–1528
- Francesco Maria I della Rovere 1528–1538
- Giulio della Rovere 1538–1578
- Francesco Maria II della Rovere 1578–1579

=== Boncompagni family ===
- Giacomo Boncompagni 1579–1617
- Gregorio I Boncompagni 1617–1628
- Giovan Giacomo Boncompagni 1628–1636
- Ugo I Boncompagni 1636–1676
- Gregorio II Boncompagni 1676–1707
- Antonio I Boncompagni 1707–1731
- Gaetano Boncompagni 1731–1777
- Antonio II Boncompagni 1777–1796

== Cantelmi counts and dukes ==
The County of Sora had been constituted in 1399 as a fief of the Kingdom of Naples. In 1443 Nicola Cantelmo, who was already count of Sora and nearby Alvito, was named the first duke of Sora by Alfonso I. His fief was intended as a buffer between the Neapolitan kingdom and the Papal States. The Cantelmi struggled in the 15th century for a greater degree of autonomy, often taking advantage of the succession crises that threatened to tear apart the Kingdom of Naples until the early 16th century.

In 1450, during one of these wars, Pope Pius II, who supported the Aragonese party, sent Federico III da Montefeltro against the Cantelmi. The Soran army was defeated and the duchy pacified. In 1463 however the Cantelmi rebelled again. This time the papal commander was Napoleone Orsini, who captured Isola del Liri, Arpino, and a large piece of territory, making Sora a papal fief. Piergiampaolo Cantelmo lost the ducal title. His remaining lands in Alvito and Popoli were assigned to his brother Giovanni Cantelmo with the title of Count. In 1472 Pope Sixtus IV renounced his feudal rights over Sora: the duchy of Sora, now separated from that of Alvito and augmented by the addition of Arce, was given to his nephew Leonardo della Rovere, who married a daughter of King Ferdinand I of Naples.

== Della Rovere dukedom ==
Between 1494 and 1501 Duke Giovanni della Rovere (also lord of Senigallia in the Marche) defeated an Aragonese army in L'Aquila and then defeated Bartolomeo d'Alviano, who was threatening his northern frontier, near Tagliacozzo. In 1495 he conquered Ceprano and Montecassino, bringing the Duchy to its greatest territorial extent. The following year he defended an attack from Prospero Colonna, but lost Esperia and Monte San Giovanni Campano until Pope Alexander VI recognised him as duke.

After Giovanni's death, the title went to Francesco Maria I della Rovere, who was officially invested with the title by the King of France, then a pretendent to Naples, Louis XII. After defending his lands from Cesare Borgia's assault, in 1516 Francesco Maria was ousted by Fernando d'Avalos, acting for the king of Naples, Charles IV. He was the last pro-French ruler in the kingdom. The Duchy was then ruled for a short while by William de Croÿ, but the Della Rovere regained it in 1528 thanks to the efforts of Odet de Foix.

Francesco Maria was succeeded by his son Giulio, and then by Francesco Maria II della Rovere.

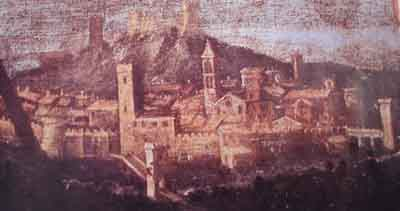
Sora and the Ducal Palace in 1604.

== Papal Sora ==
In 1579 Pope Gregory XIII acquired the duchy for 100,000 scudi, assigning it to his son Giacomo Boncompagni. The duchy was also at this time enlarged by the acquisition of Aquino and Arpino, becoming a truly autonomous seigniory only nominally dependent on the Kingdom of Naples. The creation of an independent state in southern Lazio had been managed by cardinal Francesco Maria Del Monte to counterbalance the expansion of the House of Farnese. Giacomo married Costanza Sforza, who embellished the duchy with buildings, gardens and schools. The Dukes promoted local industry by installing textile factories in Arpino and Sora and a paper industry along the Liri River. They also founded a new town, Colle Drago, but after Giacomo and his successor Gregorio I, the financial difficulties of the family, caused by such expensive projects, prevented further efforts.

At the death of duke Giovan Giacomo (1636), his brother Ugo had to face the popular rebellion of the brigand Papone, a follower of the republicanism of Masaniello. He occupied Sora and Cassino and formed a popular government. Ugo was succeeded by his son Gregorio II, who married Ippolita Ludovisi, who added to his lands the principality of Piombino. The union of the Boncompagni and Ludovisi families as the Boncompagni-Ludovisi largely resolved their economical difficulties, but at that time the duchy was facing increased custom taxes imposed by the Papal States on its merchants. Gregorio II's successor, Antonio I, died in 1731, leaving his lands to his son Gaetano, who relaunched a policy of social and economical improvements in the Liri Valley, as well as the embellishment of Colle Drago.

The last Duke was Antonio II, who ceded his state to King Ferdinand IV of Naples in 1796. The Princes Boncompagni Ludovisi are still the titular Dukes.

== See also ==
- History of Sora
