= Pope Gregory XIII =

Head of the Catholic Church from 1572 to 1585

- Bishop of Rome
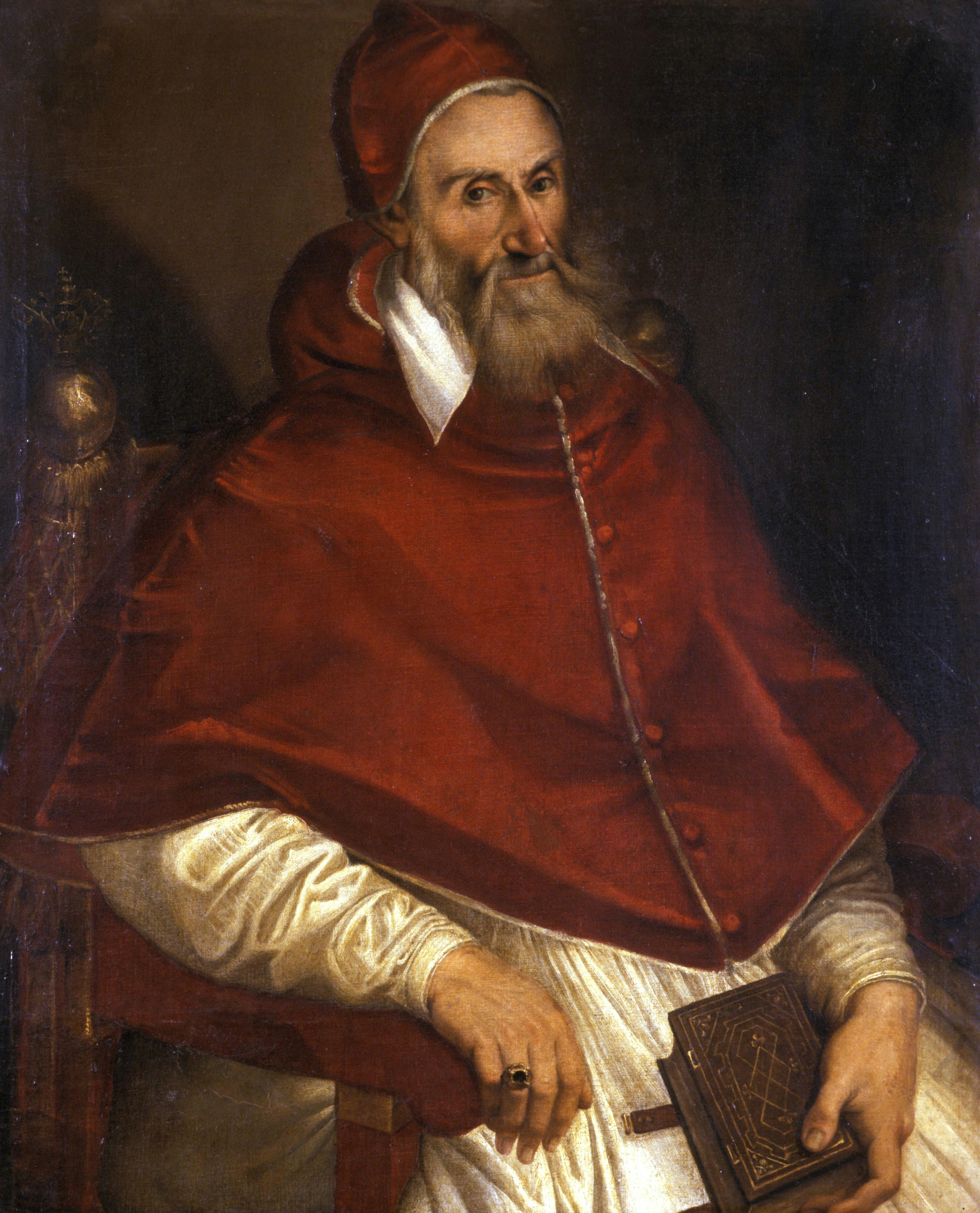
- Portrait by Bartolomeo Passarotti (c. 1586, Friedenstein Palace, Gotha)
- Church: Catholic Church
- Papacy began: 13 May 1572
- Papacy ended: 10 April 1585
- Predecessor: Pius V
- Successor: Sixtus V
- Previous posts: Bishop of Vieste (1558–1560); Legate to Spain (1565); Prefect of the Apostolic Signatura (1565); Cardinal-Priest of San Sisto Vecchio (1565–1572)

Orders
- Ordination: 31 July 1558 by Girolamo Maccabei
- Consecration: 6 August 1558 by Girolamo Maccabei
- Created cardinal: 12 March 1565 by Pius IV

Personal details
- Born: Ugo Boncompagni; 7 January 1502 (Note: New Style: 17 January 1502) Bologna, Papal States
- Died: 10 April 1585 (aged 83) Rome, Papal States
- Education: University of Bologna
- Motto: Aperuit et clausit ("Opened and closed")

- Coat of arms

Papal styles of Pope Gregory XIII
- Reference style: His Holiness
- Spoken style: Your Holiness
- Religious style: Holy Father
- Posthumous style: None

Pope Gregory XIII (Latin: Gregorius XIII, Italian: Gregorio XIII, born Ugo Boncompagni; 7 January 1502 – 10 April 1585 (Note: Because of the change in calendars initiated by Gregory, dates in this calendar on or before 4 October 1582 are given in the Julian calendar and dates after that are given in the Gregorian calendar.)) was head of the Catholic Church and ruler of the Papal States from 13 May 1572 to his death in April 1585. He is best known for commissioning and being the namesake for the Gregorian calendar, which remains the internationally accepted civil calendar to this day.

== Early biography ==
=== Youth ===
Ugo Boncompagni was born the son of Cristoforo Boncompagni (10 July 1470 – 1546) and Angela Marescalchi, and paternal grandson of Giacomo Boncompagni and Camilla Piattesi, in Bologna, where he studied law and graduated in 1530. He later taught jurisprudence for some years, and his students included notable figures such as Cardinals Alexander Farnese, Reginald Pole and Charles Borromeo. He had an illegitimate son after an affair with Maddalena Fulchini, Giacomo Boncompagni, but before he took holy orders, making him the last Pope to have left issue.

=== Career before papacy ===
At the age of 36, he was summoned to Rome by Pope Paul III (1534–1549), under whom he held successive appointments as first judge of the capital, abbreviator, and vice-chancellor of the Campagna e Marittima. Pope Paul IV (1555–1559) attached him as datarius to the suite of Cardinal Carlo Carafa. Pope Pius IV (1559–1565) made him Cardinal-Priest of San Sisto Vecchio and sent him to the Council of Trent.

In the year 1552, Ugo Boncompagni confirmed the paternity of his son Giacomo (or Jacopo). As stated in the online Archivio Digitale Boncompagni Ludovisi: "One of the most valuable items to emerge from the new archival finds from the Villa Aurora is an autograph declaration in Latin and Italian dated 22 December 1552 by Ugo Boncompagni (1502–1585, from 1572 Pope Gregory XIII). Here, Ugo confirms his paternity of Giacomo (or Jacopo) Boncompagni (1548–1612) by Maddalena de' Fucchinis, a servant in the employ of his sister-in-law Laura Ferro. The future Pope explains in detail the circumstances of the boy's conception, which took place in 1547, in Bologna after the Council of Trent had moved to that city; his motive was to assure his inheritance rights following the death (in 1546) of his father Cristoforo Boncompagni."

He also served as a legate to Philip II of Spain (1556–1598), being sent by the Pope to investigate the Archbishop of Toledo Bartolomé Carranza. He formed a lasting and close relationship with the Spanish king, which aided his foreign policy aims as Pope.

=== Election as pope ===
After Pope Pius V (1566–1572) died, the conclave chose Cardinal Boncompagni, who assumed the name of Gregory XIII in homage to Gregory the Great, a 6th-century reforming pope. It was a very brief conclave, lasting less than 24 hours. Many historians have attributed this to the influence and backing of the Spanish king. Charles Borromeo and the cardinals, wishing reform, accepted Boncompagni's candidature and so supported him in the conclave, while the Spanish faction also deemed him acceptable due to his success as a nuncio in Spain.

== Pontificate ==
=== Reform of the Church ===
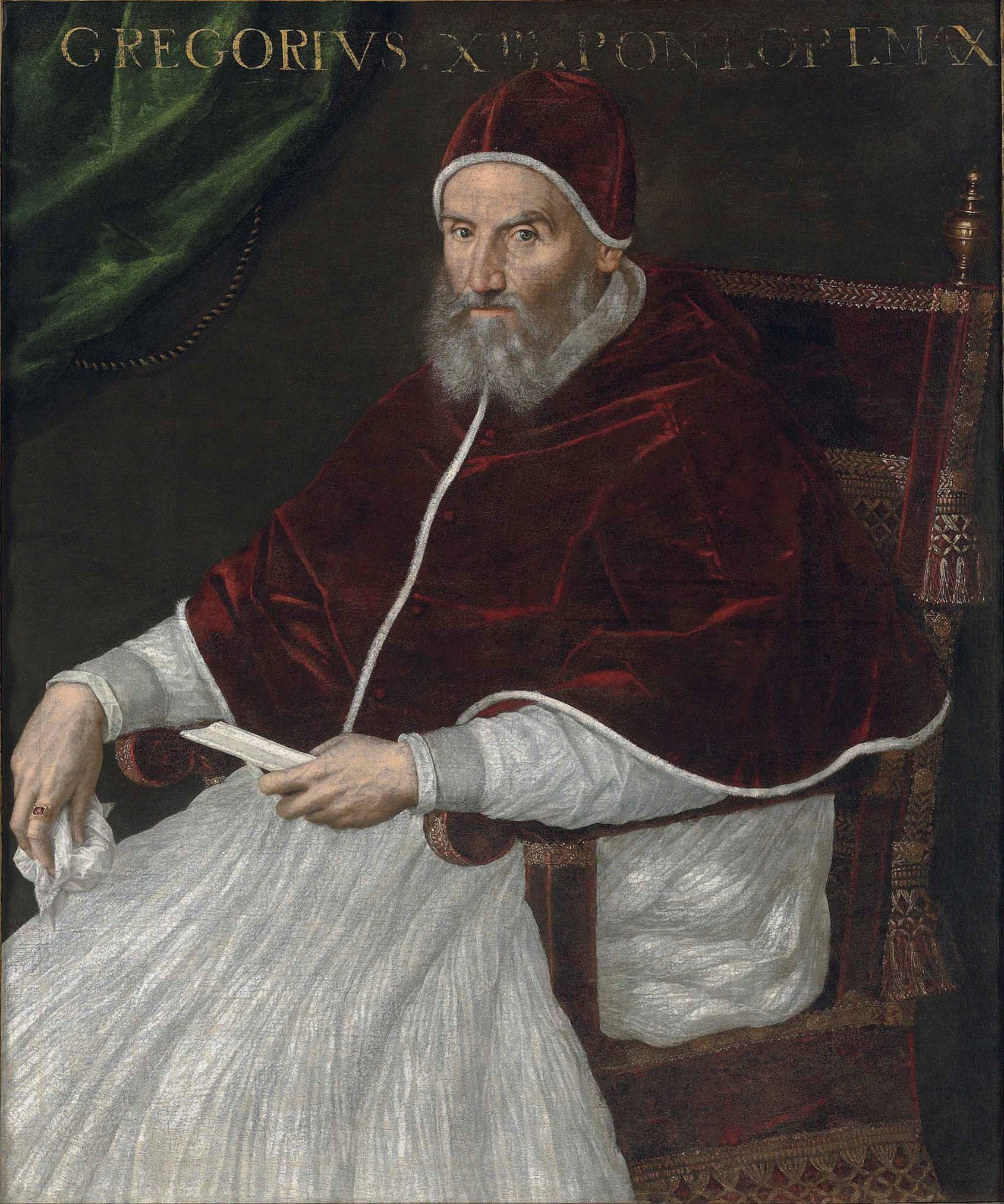
Portrait of Gregory XIII by Lavinia Fontana (oil on canvas, private collection)

Once in the chair of Saint Peter, Gregory XIII dedicated himself to reform of the Catholic Church. He implemented the recommendations of the Council of Trent. He mandated that cardinals reside in their sees without exception, and designated a committee to update the Index of Forbidden Books. Gregory XIII was also the patron of a new and greatly improved edition of the Corpus juris canonici. In a time of considerable centralisation of power, Gregory XIII abolished the Cardinals Consistories, replacing them with Colleges and appointing specific tasks for these colleges to work on. He was renowned for fierce independence; some confidants noted that he neither welcomed interventions nor sought advice. The power of the papacy increased under him, whereas the influence and power of the cardinals substantially decreased.

Gregory XIII also established the Discalced Carmelites, an offshoot of the Carmelite Order, as a distinct unit or "province" within the former by the decree "Pia consideratione" dated 22 June 1580, ending a period of great difficulty between them and enabling the former to become a significant religious order in the Catholic Church.

=== Formation of clergy and promotion of the arts and sciences ===
Gregory XIII was a generous patron of the Jesuit colleges in Rome. The Roman College of the Jesuits grew substantially under his patronage, and became the most important centre of learning in Europe for a time. It is now named the Pontifical Gregorian University. Pope Gregory XIII also founded numerous seminaries for training priests, beginning with the German College at Rome, and put them in the charge of the Jesuits.

In 1575, he gave official status to the Congregation of the Oratory, a community of priests without vows, dedicated to prayer and preaching (founded by Saint Philip Neri). In 1580, he commissioned artists, including Ignazio Danti, to complete works to decorate the Vatican and commissioned The Gallery of Maps.

Gregory also transformed the Dominican studium founded in the 13th century at Rome into the College of St. Thomas in 1580, as recommended by the Council of Trent. This college was the precursor of the Pontifical University of Saint Thomas Aquinas Angelicum.

=== The Gregorian calendar ===
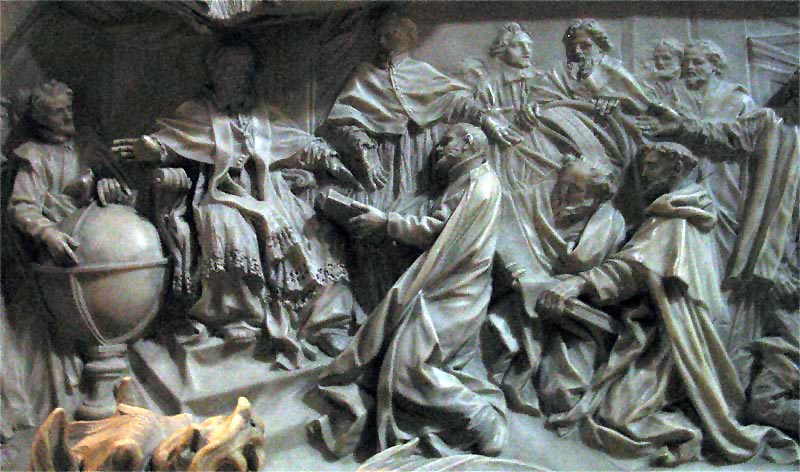
Detail of the tomb of Pope Gregory XIII celebrating the introduction of the Gregorian calendar.

Pope Gregory XIII is best known for commissioning the Gregorian calendar, initially authored by the physician/astronomer Aloysius Lilius and aided by Jesuit priest/astronomer Christopher Clavius, who made the final modifications. This calendar is more accurate than the Julian calendar, which treats each year as 365 days and 6 hours in length, even though the actual length of a year is slightly less (365 days, 5 hours, and 49 minutes). As a result, the date of the vernal equinox had slowly, over the course of 13 centuries, slipped to 10 March, while the computus (calculation) of the date of Easter still followed the traditional date of 21 March. Clavius verified this phenomenon.

Gregory subsequently decreed, by the papal bull Inter gravissimas of 24 February 1582, that the day after Thursday, 4 October 1582 would be the fifteenth, not the fifth, of October. The new calendar replaced the Julian calendar, which had been used since 45 BC. Because of Gregory's involvement, the new calendar came to be known as the Gregorian calendar and has been almost universally adopted.

Much of the populace bitterly opposed this reform; they feared it was an attempt by landlords to cheat them out of a week and a half's rent. However, the Catholic countries of Spain, Portugal, Poland-Lithuania, and the Italian states complied. France, some states of the Dutch Republic and various Catholic states in the Holy Roman Empire and Switzerland (both countries were religiously split) followed suit within a year or two. Austria and Hungary followed in 1587.

However, more than a century passed before Protestant Europe accepted the new calendar. Denmark-Norway, the remaining states of the Dutch Republic, and the Protestant states of the Holy Roman Empire and Switzerland adopted the Gregorian reform in 1700–01. By that time, the calendar trailed the seasons by 11 days. Great Britain, its American colonies and Ireland adopted the reformed calendar in 1752, where Wednesday 2 September 1752 was immediately followed by Thursday 14 September 1752; they were joined by the last Protestant holdout, Sweden, on 1 March 1753.

The Gregorian calendar was not accepted in eastern Christendom for several hundred years, and then only as the civil calendar.

=== Foreign policy ===
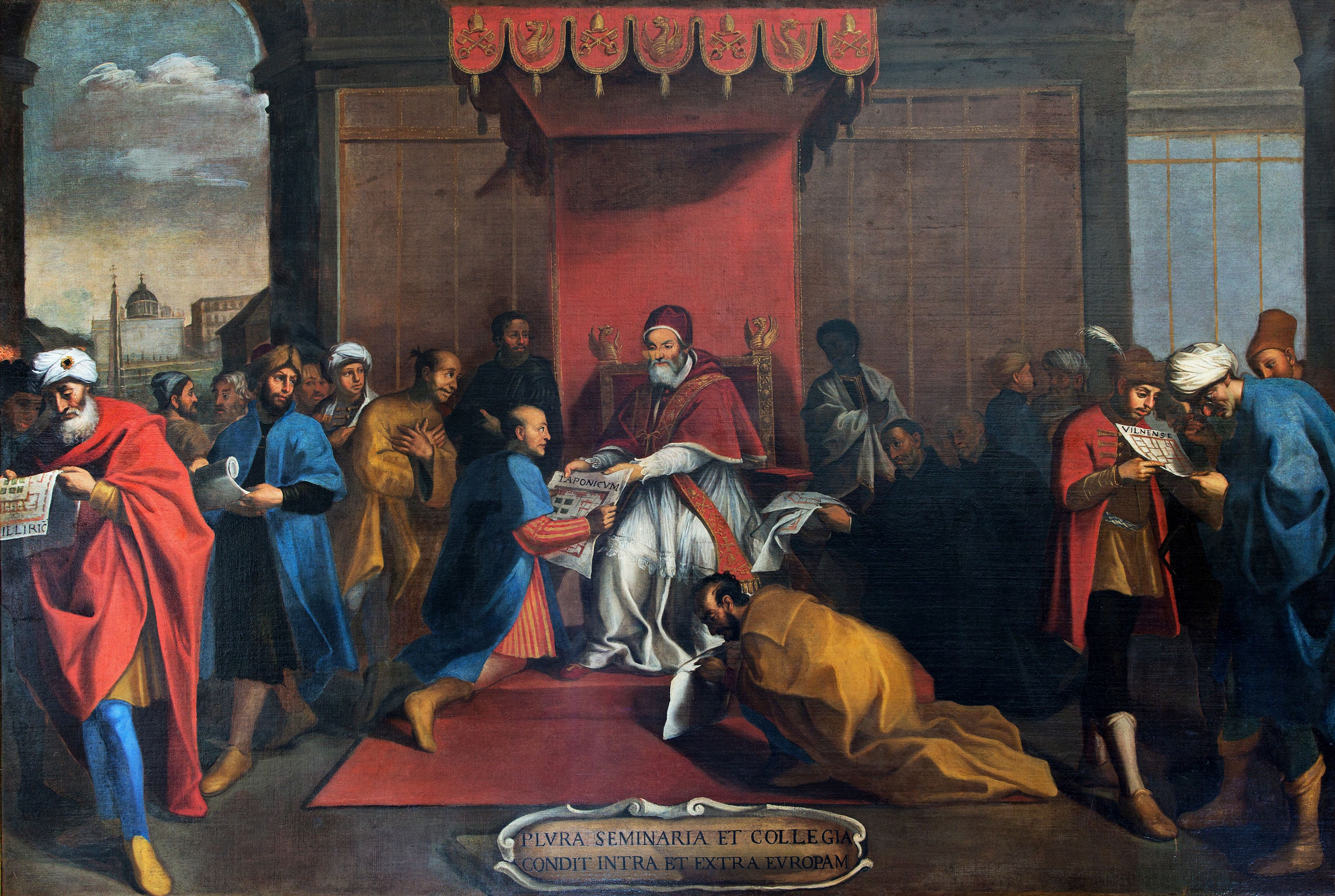
The Japanese ambassadors of Tennsho, Keisho, headed by Itō Mancio, meet with Pope Gregory XIII in 1585.

Though he feared the invasion of Europe by the Turks, Gregory XIII's attentions were more consistently directed to the dangers of the Protestants. He encouraged the plans of Philip II to dethrone Elizabeth I (r. 1558 to 1603) from the English throne, resulting in English Protestants suspecting Catholics as potential traitors and subversives.

In 1578, to further the plans of exiled English and Irish Catholics such as Nicholas Sanders, William Allen, and James Fitzmaurice FitzGerald, Gregory outfitted adventurer Thomas Stukeley with a ship and an army of 800 men to land in Ireland to aid the Catholics against the Protestant plantations. To his dismay, Stukeley joined his forces with those of King Sebastian of Portugal against Sultan Abdul Malik of Morocco instead.

Another papal expedition sailed to Ireland in 1579, with a mere 50 soldiers under the command of Fitzmaurice, accompanied by Sanders as papal legate. They took part in the Second Desmond Rebellion. All of the soldiers and sailors on board, as well as the women and children who accompanied them, were beheaded or hanged on landing in Kerry in the Smerwick Massacre.

In 1580, he was persuaded by English Jesuits to moderate or suspend the Bull Regnans in Excelsis (1570), which had excommunicated Queen Elizabeth I of England. Catholics were advised to obey the queen outwardly in all civil matters until such time as a suitable opportunity presented itself for her overthrow.

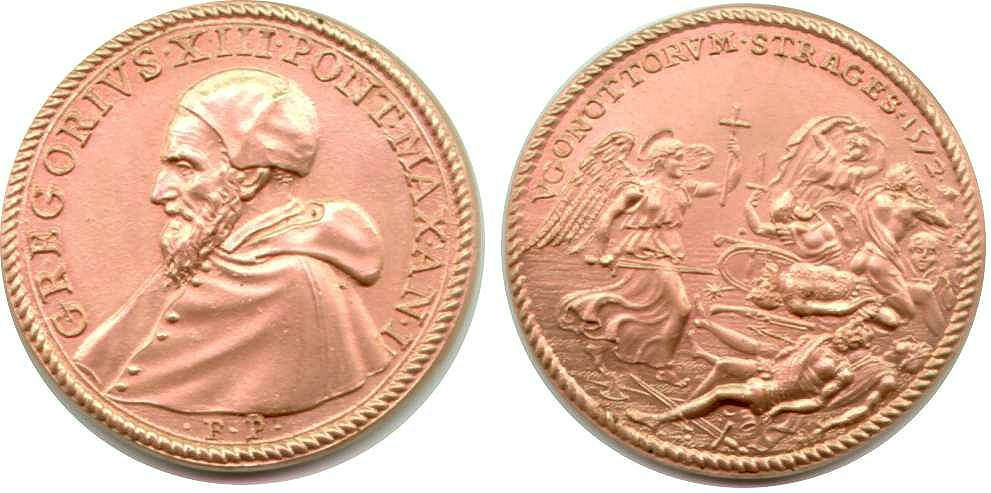
Ugonottorum Strages medal

After the St. Bartholomew's Day Massacres of Huguenots in France in 1572, Pope Gregory signalled his approval and celebrated a Te Deum mass. Three frescoes in the Sala Regia hall of the Vatican depicting the events were commissioned and painted by Giorgio Vasari. A commemorative medal was issued with Gregory's portrait and on the obverse a chastising angel, sword in hand and the legend UGONOTTORUM STRAGES ("Overthrow of the Huguenots").

Gregory XIII was visited by the Tenshō embassy of Japan, becoming the first Pope to have received such an embassy. On behalf of the Japanese ruler Oda Nobunaga, they gifted him with the so-called Azuchi Screens, which were put on display within the Vatican.

=== Cultural patronage ===
In Rome, Gregory XIII built the Gregorian chapel in the Basilica of St. Peter and extended the Quirinal Palace in 1580. He also turned the Baths of Diocletian into a granary in 1575.

He appointed his illegitimate son Giacomo, (Note: Ugo Boncompagni had Giacomo legitimated on 5 July 1548 by the bishop of Feltre.) born to his mistress at Bologna before his papacy, castellan of Sant'Angelo and Gonfalonier of the Church; Venice, anxious to please the Pope, enrolled his son among its nobles, and Philip II of Spain appointed him general in his army. Gregory also helped his son to become a powerful feudatory through the acquisition of the Duchy of Sora, on the border between the Papal States and the Kingdom of Naples.

To raise funds for his endeavours, Gregory confiscated a large proportion of the houses and properties throughout the states of the Church. This measure enriched his treasury for a time, but alienated a great body of the nobility and gentry, revived old factions, created new ones, and caused economic and social chaos in the Papal States.

=== Canonisations and beatifications ===
The pope canonised four saints during his pontificate and, in 1584, beatified his predecessor Pope Gregory VII.

=== Consistories ===
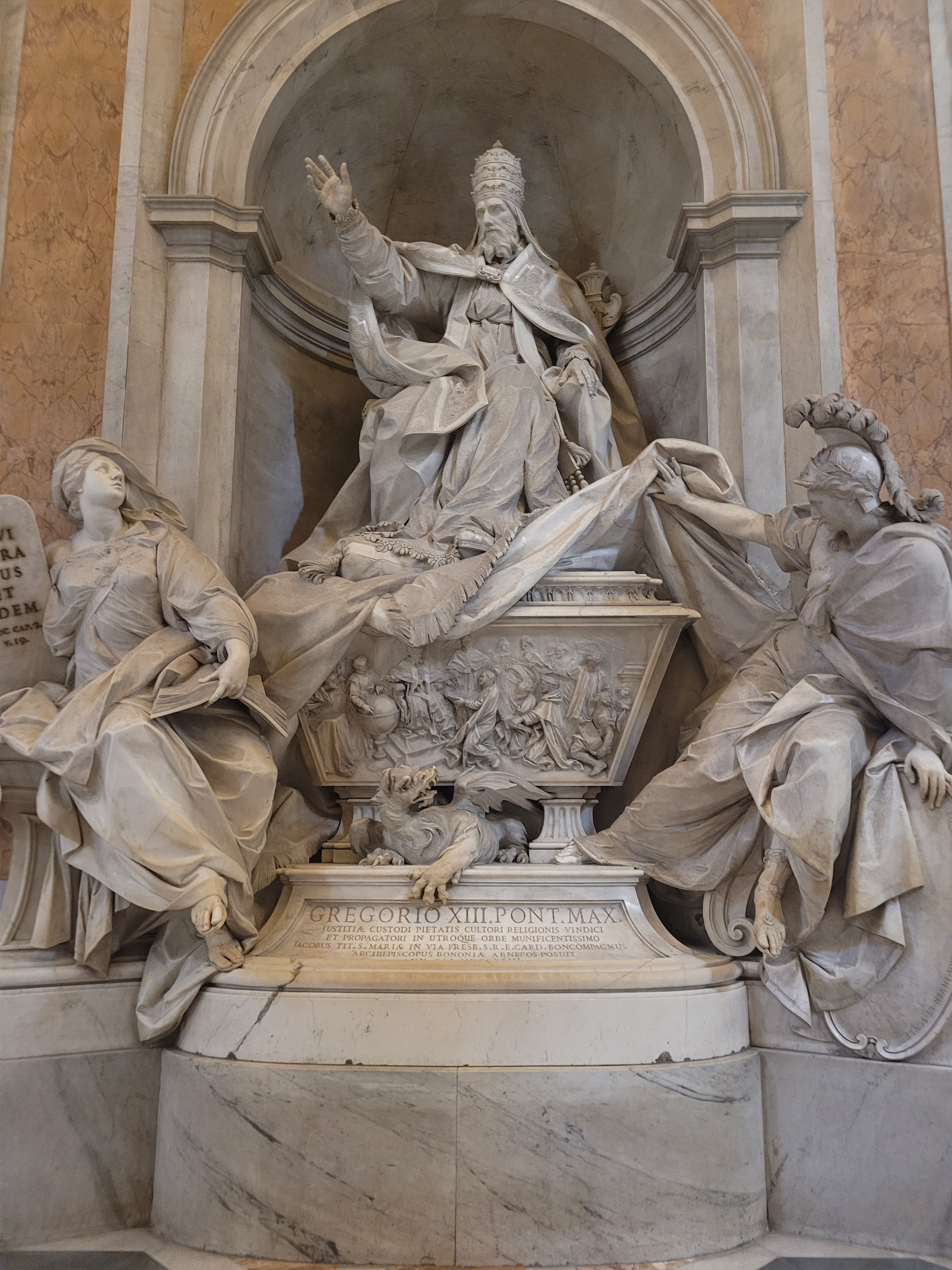
Gregory XIII tomb in the St Peter Basilica in Vatican City

During his pontificate, the pope created 34 cardinals in eight consistories; this included naming his nephew Filippo Boncompagni to the cardinalate in the pope's first consistory in 1572. Gregory XIII also named four of his successors as cardinals all in 1583: Giovanni Battista Castagna (Urban VII), Niccolò Sfondrati (Gregory XIV), Giovanni Antonio Facchinetti (Innocent IX), and Alessandro de' Medici (Leo XI).

== Death ==
The pope suffered from a fever on 5 April 1585 and on 7 April said his usual private Mass, still in ill health. He seemed to recover enough that he was able to conduct meetings throughout 8 and 9 April, although it was observed that he did not feel well. But a sudden change on 10 April saw him confined in his bed and it was observed that he had a cold sweat and a weak pulse; he received Extreme Unction moments before he died.

== See also ==
- Computus
- Clavius
- Cardinals created by Gregory XIII

== Explanatory notes ==
Catholic Church titles
| Preceded by Pius V | Pope; 13 May 1572 – 10 April 1585 | Succeeded by Sixtus V |
