= House of Boncompagni =

Princely family of the Italian nobility

- Coat of arms of Boncompagni family
- Country: Papal States; Kingdom of Naples; Duchy of Sora; Kingdom of Italy
- Founded: 1133; 893 years ago
- Founder: Rodolfo Boncompagni
- Titles: Pope (non-hereditary); Duke of Sora; Duke of Arce; Lord of Arpino; Prince of Piombino; Lord of Aquino; Duke of Fiano; Duke of Monterotondo; Marquis of Vignola; Marquis of Populonia
- Deposition: 1796; 230 years ago (from Sora); 1801; 225 years ago (from Piombino)
- Cadet branches: Boncompagni-Ludovisi

The House of Boncompagni is a princely family of the Italian nobility which settled in Bologna in around the 14th century, but was probably originally from Umbria.

In 1572, Ugo Boncompagni was elected pope, taking the name Gregory XIII, and the family prospered. In 1579, the pope bought the Duchy of Sora from the Della Rovere family for his son Giacomo, whose descendants reigned there as dukes until 1796. Later, they also obtained the Principality of Piombino, following the marriage of Gregorio II Boncompagni with Ippolita Ludovisi, princess of Piombino and last of her dynasty. They reigned over Piombino as Boncompagni-Ludovisi, until Antonio II Boncompagni Ludovisi was deposed as Prince of Piombino in 1801; the heads of the family, though no longer reigning, continued to be known as "Prince [forenames] Boncompagni Ludovisi" as of 2023.

== History ==
The Bolognese family, perhaps originally from Umbria, rose socially with the marriage of Cristoforo Boncompagni (1470 - 1546) to the noble Angela Marescalchi. In 1572, Ugo Boncompagni, son of Cristoforo and Angela, was elected Pope Gregory XIII, the 226th pope of the Catholic Church, followed by increased power and prestige of the family.

Many family members obtained important positions in the Church; five were created cardinals: Filippo (1548 - 1586), Francesco (1592 - 1641), Girolamo (1622 - 1684), Giacomo (1652 - 1731), Ignazio Gaetano (1743 - 1790); of these, among other posts, one was Archbishop of Naples and two were Archbishops of Bologna, while another was also Secretary of State of the Holy See.

Gregorio II Boncompagni was lord of Piombino from 1706 to 1707.

The family later merged with the Ludovisi family.

The princes Boncompagni-Ludovisi inherited a large (30 hectare) estate in Rome with vast collections of art; in 1883 they subdivided it and sold most of it, retaining and living in what became known as the Casino di Villa Boncompagni Ludovisi or Villa Aurora, which remained in the family until 2023, when it was put up for auction. The 19th-century mathematician Baldassarre Boncompagni-Ludovisi was a member of the family.

Prince Francesco Boncompagni Ludovisi (1886-1955) was Governor of Rome from 1928 to 1935. Prince Nicolò Boncompagni Ludovisi died in 2018, leaving three sons.

== Sources ==
- Alonzi, L. (2003). Famiglia, patrimonio e finanze nobiliari. I Boncompagni (secoli XVI-XVIII). Manduria-Bari-Rome: Lacaita.
