= Pian d'Alma Marsh =

Marshland in Tuscany, Italy

- Padule Pian d'Alma
- Interactive map of Pian d'Alma Marsh
- Location: Pian d'Alma, Castiglione della Pescaia, Province of Grosseto, Tuscany, Italy
- Coordinates: 42°50′25″N 10°47′03″E
- Area: 68 ha (170 acres)

Pian d'Alma Marsh (Italian: Padule Pian d'Alma) is a coastal wetland and biotope in southern Tuscany, Italy, near the hamlet of Pian d'Alma in the municipality of Castiglione della Pescaia, province of Grosseto. The marsh extends for about 68 hectares near the mouth of the Alma River, between Cala Civette and Punta Ala on the Tyrrhenian coast.

The area is included within the Site of Regional Importance (SIR) of Monte d'Alma, and proposed as a Site of Community Importance (pSIC) with the code IT51A0008.

The marsh preserves a mosaic of woodland and salt-tolerant wetland vegetation typical of the Maremma coast. Plant communities include reed beds dominated by Phragmites australis, rush meadows with Juncus acutus and Juncus gerardi, and halophytic vegetation with species such as Atriplex portulacoides and Sarcocornia perennis. Wooded sectors are mainly composed of narrow-leaved ash (Fraxinus oxycarpa) and field elm (Ulmus minor), with tamarisk species occurring in more saline soils.

== History ==
Until the mid-19th century, much of the lower Alma valley remained subject to seasonal flooding and marsh conditions. Pian d'Alma Marsh was historically one of three small marshes located north of Castiglione della Pescaia; the other two, at Pian di Rocca and Gualdo, were later reclaimed and drained, making Pian d'Alma the only surviving wetland of the group.

In 1787, Grand Duke Peter Leopold of Tuscany visited the area and described the marsh as "entirely marshy, full of reeds and marsh plants, formed by the Alma river and its overflows, which could easily be drained with a channel to the sea". In 1863, during an inspection of Tuscan land reclamation works after the unification of Italy, engineer Gaetano Giorgini observed that the marshes north of Castiglione della Pescaia had still not been reclaimed. He also noted that, during the late Habsburg-Lorraine period, a two-arched bridge equipped with angular sluice gates had been constructed at the mouth of the Alma to regulate water flow within the marsh.

== Sources ==
- Giorgini, Gaetano (1863). Relazione sullo stato del bonificamento delle Maremme toscane nel luglio del 1863. Florence: Bettini. p. 60.
- Rombai, Leonardo (June 2018). "Le pinete costiere toscane, un profilo geostorico". Rivista di storia dell'agricoltura. LVIII (1): 3–36.
- Selvi, Federico; Stefanini, Paolo. "Padule Pian d'Alma". Biotopi naturali e aree protette nella Provincia di Grosseto: componenti floristiche e ambienti vegetazionali. I quaderni delle aree protette. Vol. 1. Provincia di Grosseto.
