= Fort Rocchette =

- Forte delle Rocchette
- Rocchette, Castiglione della Pescaia, Tuscany, Italy
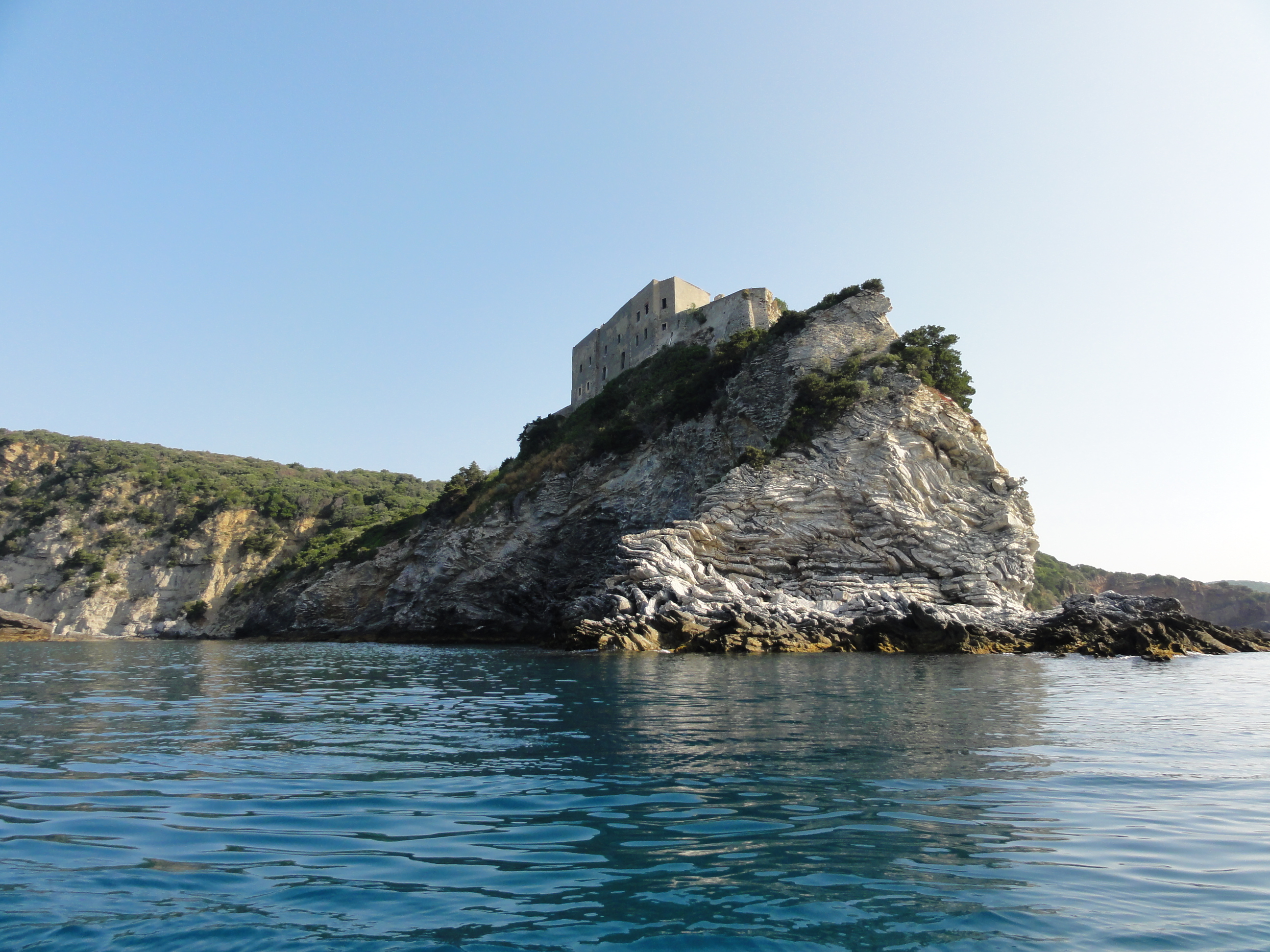

Site information
- Type: Coastal fort
- Owner: Private
- Open to the public: No
- Condition: Preserved

Location
- Coordinates: 42.7736°N 10.7906°E

Site history
- Built: 12th century (watchtower); 1568 (fort)
- In use: 12th century–19th century

Fort Rocchette (Italian: Forte delle Rocchette) is a historic coastal fortification located on the promontory of Rocchette between Castiglione della Pescaia and Punta Ala, in the province of Grosseto, Tuscany, central Italy.

== History ==
The site originated as a watchtower built during the 12th century in a strategic position overlooking a small harbor that once existed nearby. A papal bull of 1188 records both a nearby parish church and the fortification, then known as Rocca de Campo Albo. By 1289 the structure was referred to as Rocchetta de Capalbi.

During the reign of Cosimo I de' Medici, the fortress was substantially enlarged and strengthened as part of the coastal defense system of the Grand Duchy of Tuscany. The reconstruction works were completed in 1568, transforming the medieval tower into a larger military stronghold.

In the late 18th century, the chapel of Madonna del Carmine was built near the fort. After the unification of Italy, the military installation was decommissioned and converted into a lighthouse. The lighthouse remained active until the first half of the 20th century, after which the property passed into private ownership.

== Architecture ==
The fort is enclosed by polygonal defensive walls dating largely from the 16th-century Medici reconstruction. At the center of the northern side stands the original medieval square tower, which survives without its former crowning structure. Several adjoining buildings retain crenellated rooflines, while sections of the outer walls preserve their sloping defensive base.
