= Buriano, Castiglione della Pescaia =

Buriano
- Frazione
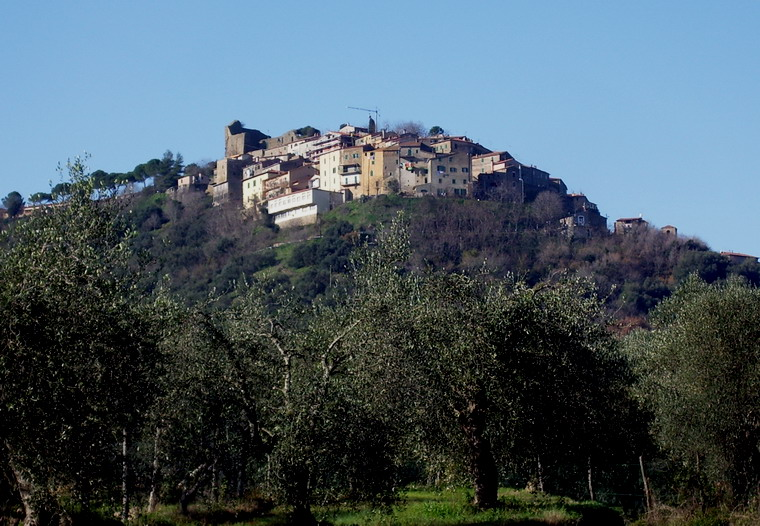
- View of Buriano

- Location of Buriano in Italy
- Coordinates: 42°50′44″N 10°59′20″E
- Country: Italy
- Region: Tuscany
- Province: Grosseto (GR)
- Comune: Castiglione della Pescaia
- Elevation: 184 m (604 ft)

Population (2011)
  - Total: 178
- Demonym: Burianesi
- Time zone: UTC+1 (CET)
  - Summer (DST): UTC+2 (CEST)
- Postal code: 58040
- Dialing code: (+39) 0564

Buriano is a village in Tuscany, central Italy, administratively a frazione of the comune of Castiglione della Pescaia, province of Grosseto. At the time of the 2001 census its population amounted to 257.

Buriano is about 17 km from Grosseto and 20 km from Castiglione della Pescaia, and it is situated on a hill in the massif of Poggio Ballone.

== History ==
The village dates back to the Early Middle Ages, when it was one of the towns held by the Aldobrandeschi family; then it was ruled by the Lambardi (until the 14th century) and by the Appiani of Piombino (until 1815).

== Main sights ==
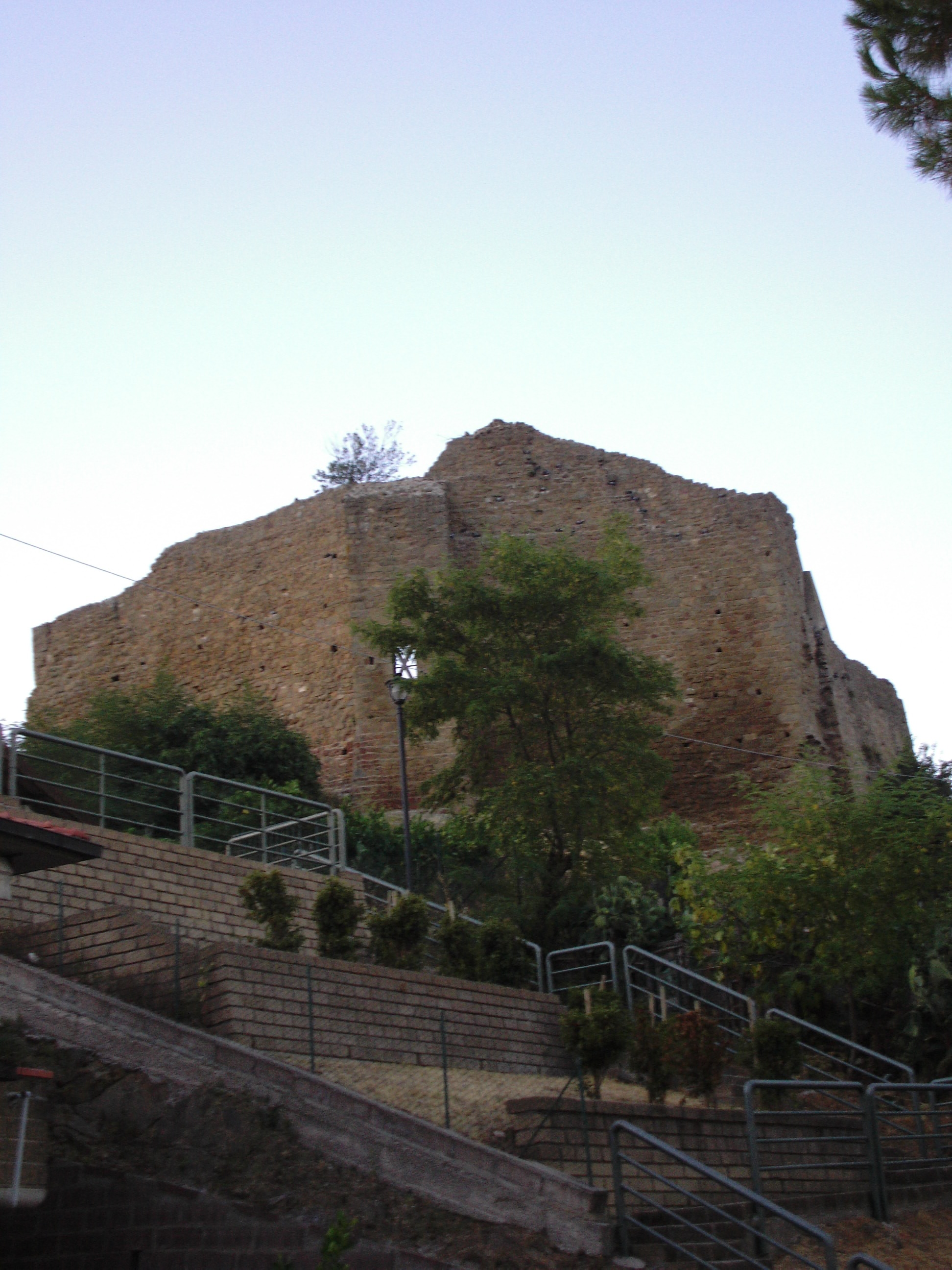
The castle of Aldobrandeschi

- Church of Santa Maria Assunta (9th century), main parish church of the village, it was first mentioned in an act of 1051.
- Oratory of San Guglielmo (18th century), built in 1703 in the hamlet of Piano della Fonte.
- Hermitage of San Guglielmo (16th century), located in the woods south of the village, it was built in 1597 by priest Giovanni Nicolucci in the place where, according to legend, Virgin Mary appears to saint William of Maleval.
- Rocca aldobrandesca (10th century), large fortress which lies on the top of the hill, it was the seat of the Aldobrandeschi family in Buriano.

== Bibliography ==
- Bruno Santi, Guida storico-artistica alla Maremma. Itinerari culturali nella provincia di Grosseto, Nuova Immagine, Siena, 1995.
- Giuseppe Guerrini, Torri e castelli della provincia di Grosseto, Nuova Immagine Editrice, Siena, 1999.
- Enrico Collura, Mario Innocenti, Stefano Innocenti, Comune di Castiglione della Pescaia: briciole di storia, Grosseto, Editrice Innocenti, 2002, pp. 149–167.

== See also ==
- Pian d'Alma
- Pian di Rocca
- Punta Ala
- Roccamare
- Rocchette
- Tirli
- Vetulonia
