= Pian d'Alma =

- Frazione
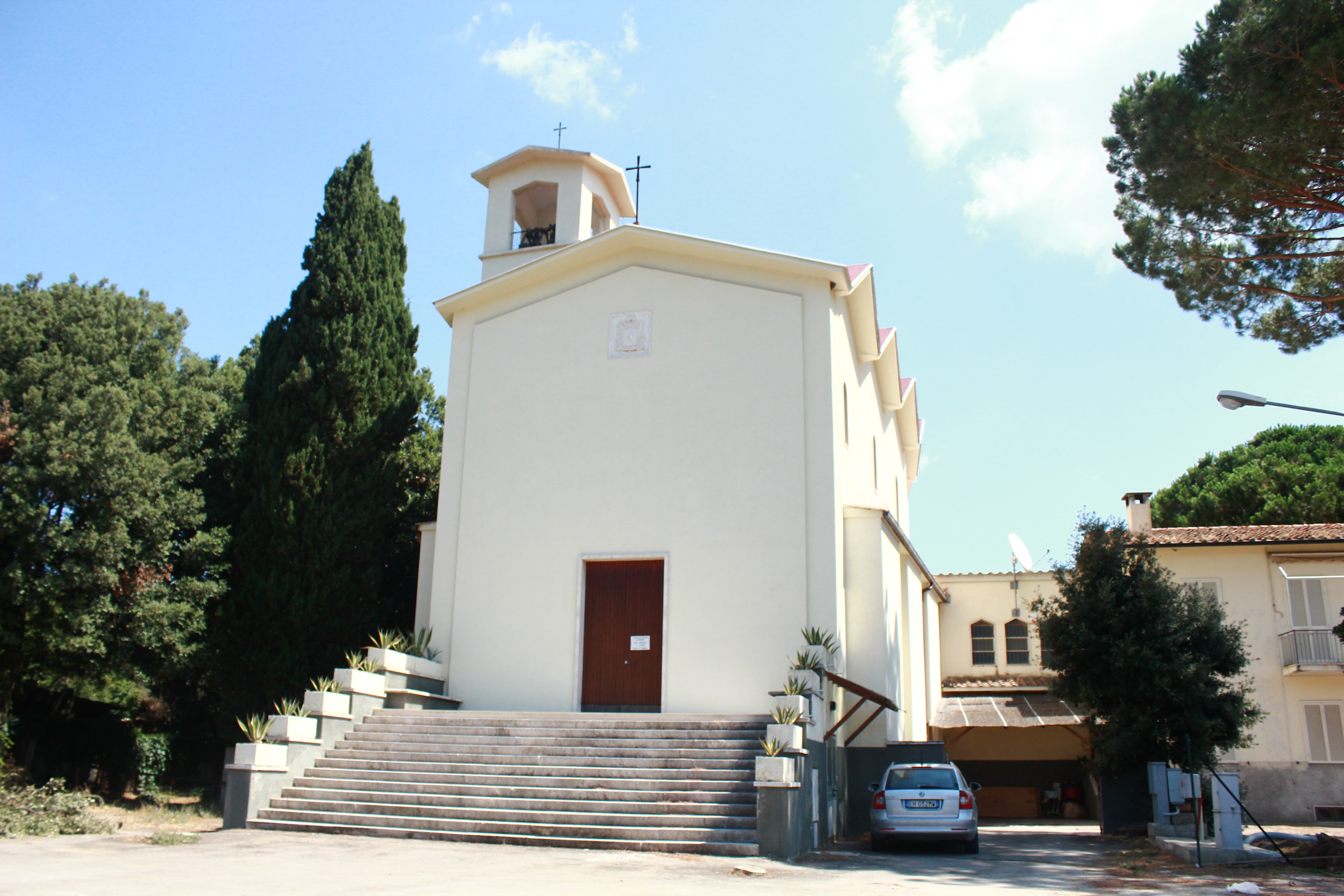
- The church of Madonna del Rosario

- Location of Pian d'Alma in Italy
- Coordinates: 42°50′37″N 10°48′57″E
- Country: Italy
- Region: Tuscany
- Province: Grosseto (GR)
- Comune: Castiglione della Pescaia; Scarlino
- Elevation: 17 m (56 ft)

Population (2011)
  - Total: 100
- Demonym: Piandalmini
- Time zone: UTC+1 (CET)
  - Summer (DST): UTC+2 (CEST)
- Postal code: 58043
- Dialing code: (+39) 0564

Pian d'Alma is a small rural village in Tuscany, central Italy, administratively divided between the municipalities of Castiglione della Pescaia and Scarlino in the province of Grosseto. It had a population of 24 in the 2001 census.

The village lies about 38 km from Grosseto, 17 km from Castiglione della Pescaia and 14 km from Scarlino, in a flat coastal plain traversed by the Alma River between the peaks of Monte d'Alma and Poggio Ballone, a few kilometres inland from the Tyrrhenian Sea. Surrounded by wetlands and protected natural areas, Pian d'Alma provides access to several notable stretches of coastline within the municipality of Scarlino, including Cala Civette, Cala Violina and Cala Martina.

== Geography ==
The hamlet lies within the flat plain formed by the Alma River, which descends from the slopes of Monte d'Alma toward the Tyrrhenian coast, where it empties into the sea. The surrounding landscape is characterized by wetlands and low-lying fields, forming part of the natural area of the Pian d'Alma Marsh. The plain is bordered by a series of low hills, forming the outermost extensions of Monte d'Alma and Poggio Ballone. These include Poggetto degli Ulivi (76 m), Poggio San Nicola (92 m), Poggio Carpineta (140 m), Poggio Moscadello (124 m), Poggio Sentinella (215 m), Poggio La Guardia (148 m), Poggio Castello (148 m), Poggio Tondo (144 m), Poggio a Cavallo (130 m), and Poggio del Maus (324 m).

The frazione is mainly rural and is made up of a number of small settlements. The most important are "La Torre", in the south, which developed around a former medieval fortified tower and is part of the municipality of Castiglione della Pescaia, and "Serrate Marchi", further north, where the church is located, in the municipality of Scarlino, on the slopes of Poggio Castello. The surrounding countryside includes several farmsteads linked to these two settlements, including Podere San Giuseppe, San Giovanni, Le Casce, Binacco, Laschi, Laschetti, Val Martina, Bottonaio, Bersagliere, Carpineta, Sant'Anna, Le Querce, Val di Torre, Val Gattolina, La Porcareccia, Val Molina, and Podere dell'Alma, the latter on the banks of the Alma River.

From Pian d'Alma, several notable coastal inlets within the municipality of Scarlino are easily accessible, including Cala Civette, Cala Violina, and Cala Martina, all known for their natural scenery and relatively unspoiled coastal environments.

== History ==
The settlement originated in the Early Middle Ages, when a castle was established on the hills overlooking the Alma River. Control over the area shifted over time between the bishops of the Diocese of Rusellae and the counts of the Della Gherardesca. Surviving documents from the 11th and 12th centuries record a number of transactions, including the partial sale of the castle and its lands, as well as the transfer of the estate to the Abbey of Sestinga.

By the late 12th century, the castle had already fallen into disrepair and was described as abandoned. Its exact location remains uncertain, though it is generally placed in the hills near Tirli, between the Alma and the Hermitage of Maleval. Some scholars have tentatively identified it with the nearby Castle Maus, an 11th-century fortification later deserted under unclear circumstances.

In the following centuries, the settlement gradually shifted toward the Torre d'Alma, a watchtower of early medieval origin linked to the Abbey of Sestinga. During the 14th century, the area came under the authority of the Republic of Siena and, from 1398 onward, occupied a frontier position between the Principality of Piombino and the Grand Duchy of Tuscany. As borders shifted over time, the settlement repeatedly passed between these jurisdictions, until its final incorporation into Tuscany in 1815.

A phase of renewed development occurred in the 1950s, when bishop Paolo Galeazzi promoted the construction of a parish church to serve the local community.

== Main sights ==
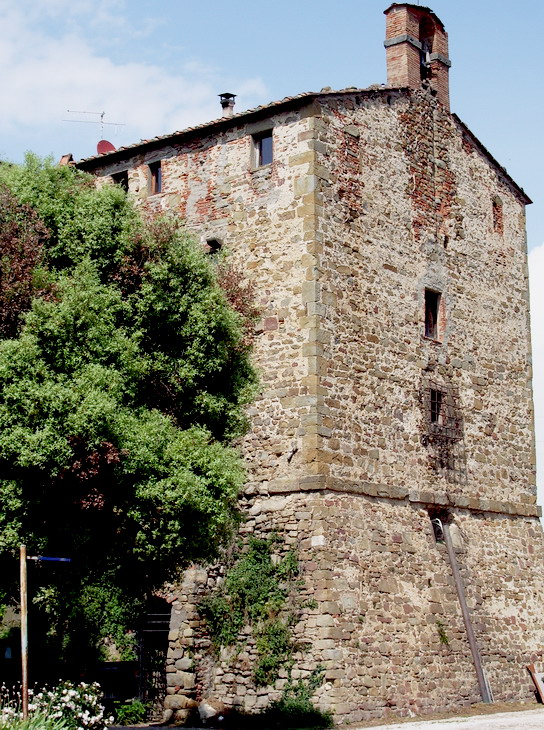
The Alma Tower

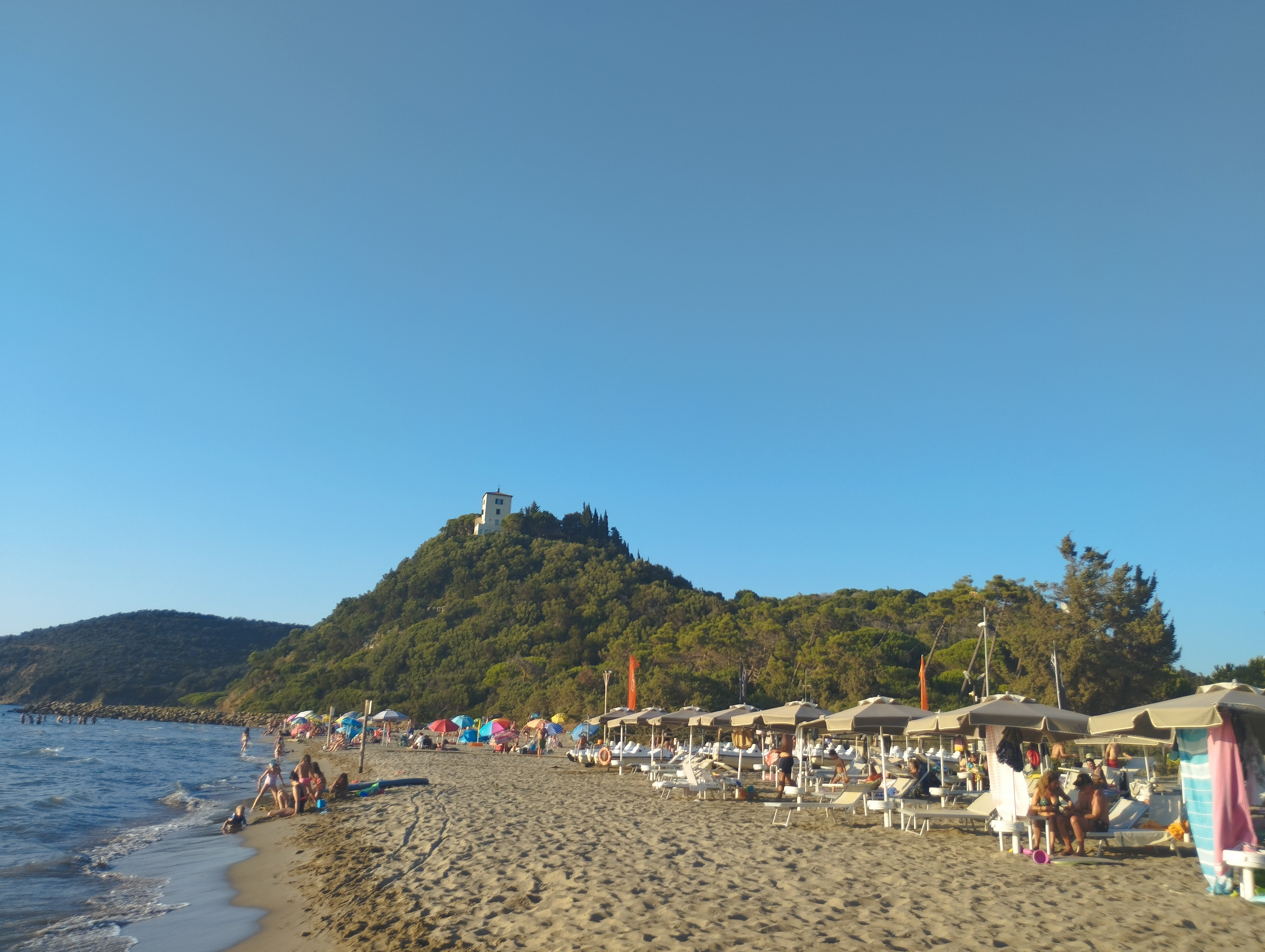
The beach at the mouth of the Alma overlooked by the Torre Civette

=== Madonna del Rosario ===
The church of Our Lady of the Rosary (Madonna del Rosario) is the main place of worship of the hamlet, located in the part of Pian d'Alma known as Serrate Marchi, within the municipality of Scarlino. The parish was established in 1946 by bishop Paolo Galeazzi and officially recognized in 1948. The church itself was built shortly afterwards: construction began in 1958 and it was completed and consecrated in December 1959, based on a design by engineer Ernesto Ganelli. In 1989, the parish was suppressed and merged with that of the Consolata in Punta Ala. The building is in Neo-Romanesque style.

An earlier religious structure in the area was the medieval pieve of San Giovanni, first documented in 1055 and dependent on the Abbey of Sestinga. It was located on the slopes of Poggio Castello and remained in use until at least the 15th century, after which it was abandoned. Almost all physical traces of the church have disappeared; however, a small number of architectural and decorative elements—such as a column, a capital, and several finely worked stone blocks—have been preserved through reuse in the façades of the Marchi farmhouse.

=== Medieval fortifications ===
The territory of Pian d'Alma includes several fortifications dating from the medieval period. The Alma Tower (Torre d'Alma), attested from the 10th century, was initially under the control of the Abbey of Sestinga and subsequently of the Della Gherardesca family, before passing to the Republic of Siena in the 14th century. Architecturally, it presents the typical features of a tower house, later incorporated into adjacent rural structures.

Torre Civette, located on Poggio Carpineta overlooking Cala Civette and the mouth of the Alma, was constructed in the 16th century as part of the coastal defensive system of the Principality of Piombino. The structure is now used for tourist accommodation purposes.

Not far from Pian d'Alma are the remains of Castle Maus, an 11th-century fortification documented as early as 1075. Already abandoned by the 16th century, it survives today only as ruins on the hilltop of Poggio del Maus.

=== Archaeological sites ===
An Etruscan archaeological site lies along the river inland from the coast, in a locality known as La Porcareccia at the slopes of the hill of Poggio Tondo. Excavations carried out from the 1980s uncovered a necropolis with four tumulus tombs dating from the mid-7th to the mid-6th century BC, along with the remains of an isolated rural building, likely a farmhouse, in use until the late 6th century BC.

== See also ==
- Buriano, Castiglione della Pescaia
- Pian di Rocca
- Punta Ala
- Roccamare
- Rocchette
- Tirli
- Vetulonia
