= Poggio Ballone =

Mountain in Italy

Highest point
- Elevation: 631 m (2,070 ft)
- Coordinates: 42°49′43″N 10°52′58″E

Geography
- Country: Italy
- Region: Tuscany

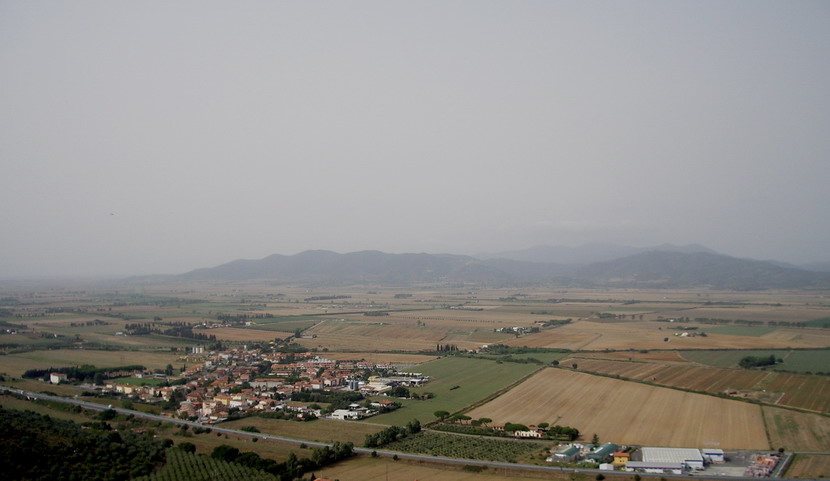
View from Montepescali, with Braccagni in the foreground and Poggio Ballone in the background

Poggio Ballone is a hilly massif in southern Tuscany, near the northern-central coast of the Maremma region. It forms the southwestern extension of the Colline Metallifere, separating the Pecora River plain from the Grosseto plain, crossed by the Bruna and Ombrone rivers.

The massif, spanning the municipalities of Castiglione della Pescaia, Gavorrano, and Scarlino, reaches its highest point at 631 meters above sea level. Several smaller hills and streams originate from its slopes, including the Alma River, which flows into the sea south of Cala Civette.

The western and southern slopes descend towards the coast, forming promontories such as the Bandite di Scarlino, Punta Ala, and Poggio Petriccio, near Castiglione della Pescaia. The northern and eastern slopes transition into the Maremma plain, featuring peaks like Monte d'Alma (557 m), Monte Calvo (468 m), Poggio Scodella (355 m), Poggio Bruno (368 m), and Poggio di Vetulonia (335 m), near the historic town and archaeological site of Vetulonia.

At the highest peak, Poggio Ballone, the Italian Air Force operates a radar station (121ª Squadriglia radar remota) for monitoring air traffic over the Tyrrhenian Sea. Other notable peaks include Poggio Spada (540 m) and Poggio Serra Alta (547 m), located east of Tirli.
