= Monte d'Alma =

Hill in Tuscany, Italy

Highest point
- Elevation: 557 m (1,827 ft)
- Coordinates: 42°53′28″N 10°51′49″E

Geography
- Location: Scarlino, Tuscany, Italy
- Parent range: Colline Metallifere

Monte d'Alma is a hill in Tuscany, Italy, reaching an elevation of 557 metres. It is one of the peaks of the Poggio Ballone massif, which forms one of the southwesternmost extensions of the Colline Metallifere in the province of Grosseto.

Monte d'Alma is designated as a site of regional interest (SIR), partly within the nature reserve of the Bandite di Scarlino. The area has also been proposed as a Site of Community Importance (pSIC) and largely falls within the Padule e Costiere di Scarlino protected area.

The site comprises a variety of habitats, including extensive woodland, coastal environments, and the wetland of Pian d'Alma, which supports species of conservation interest. Vegetation is dominated by holm oak forests and Mediterranean scrub, with deciduous woodlands and chestnut groves in cooler areas. The fauna includes species such as the short-toed snake eagle (Circaetus gallicus) and the European wildcat (Felis silvestris), as well as various reptiles and protected insects.

The mountain is the source of the Alma River, which marks the separation from the Poggio Ballone peak and flows toward the coast, forming the plain of Pian d'Alma before reaching the Tyrrhenian Sea near Cala Civette.
