= William the Great =

William the Great may refer to:

- William V of Aquitaine (969–1030)
- William I, Count of Burgundy (1020–1087)
- William of Maleval (died 1157)
- William I, German Emperor (1797–1888), nicknamed Wilhelm the Great during the reign of his grandson Wilhelm II
