= Alma (Tuscany) =

River in Grosseto, Tuscany

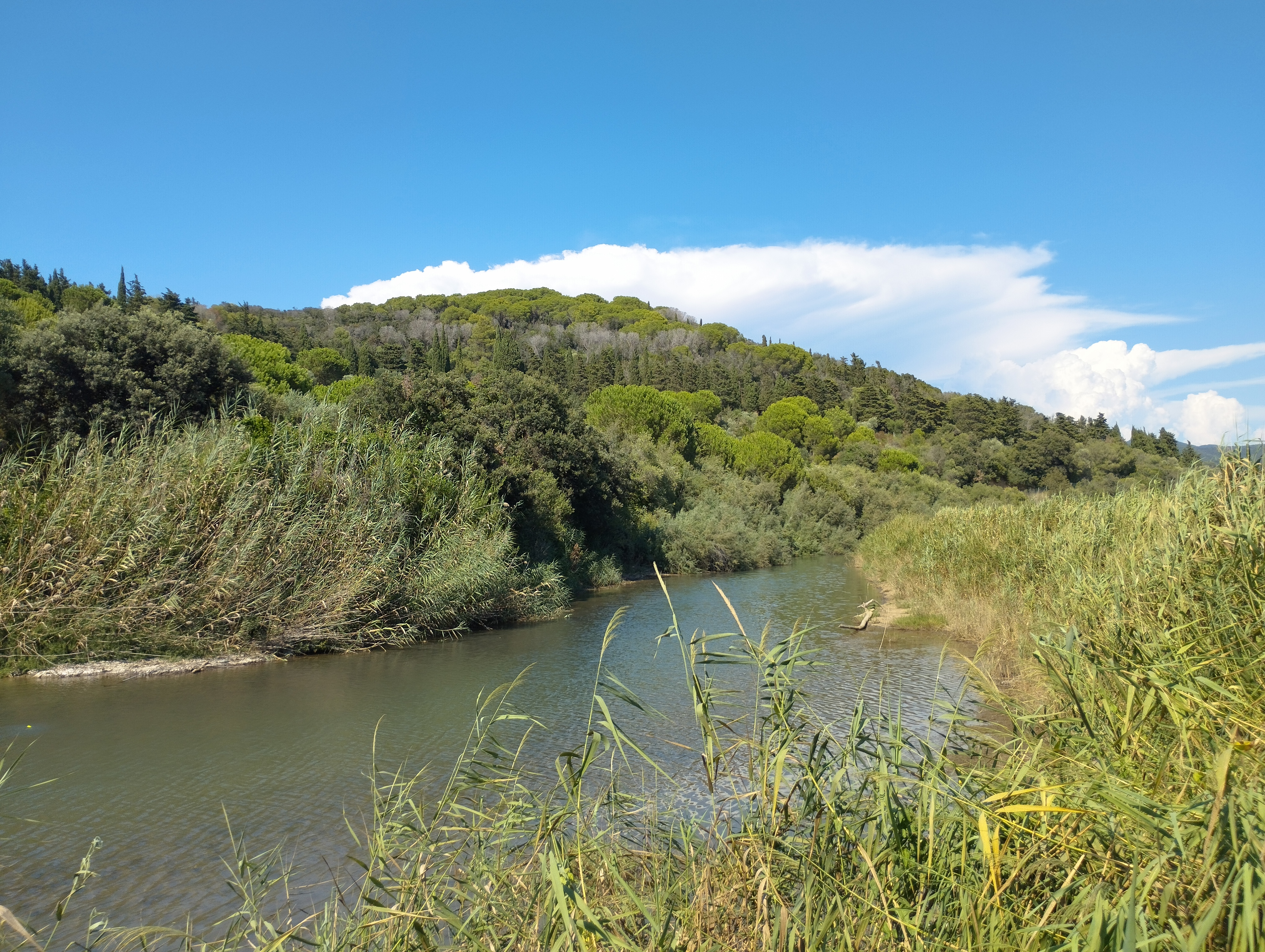

Location
- Country: Italy
- Region: Tuscany
- Municipalities: Castiglione della Pescaia, Scarlino

Physical characteristics
- Source
  - location: Monte d'Alma, Scarlino
- Mouth: Tyrrhenian Sea
  - location: Cala Civette, Pian d'Alma
  - coordinates: 42°50′37.5″N 10°46′32.6″E

The Alma is a watercourse in southern Tuscany, central Italy, flowing through the northern Maremma area in the province of Grosseto.

It originates on the south-eastern slopes of Monte d'Alma within the municipality of Scarlino. From its source, it flows southwards before curving westward toward the Tyrrhenian Sea, forming the alluvial plain of Pian d'Alma. In its lower course, the Alma is divided into two main branches, the Alma Vecchio and the ditch Alma Nuovo, which rejoin near the mouth of the river just south of Cala Civette.

The river also marks part of the administrative boundary with the municipality of Castiglione della Pescaia. South of the mouth of the Alma, the Tyrrhenian coastline continues with the sandy beaches of Punta Ala, which are immediately backed inland by the Pian d'Alma Marsh, a coastal wetland covering approximately 68 hectares. The river flows through a landscape influenced by the nearby Poggio Ballone massif and the coastal system of the Bandite di Scarlino.

Historically, it marked the political boundary between the territory of the Grand Duchy of Tuscany and that of the Principality of Piombino. On the promontory separating the river mouth from Cala Civette stands Torre Civette, a former 16th-century coastal watchtower.

The mouth of the Alma is historically associated with a small coastal landing known as Porto d'Alma or Porto Civette, documented since antiquity and the medieval period. Historical records indicate that the harbour was already in existence by the 11th–12th centuries, when the area formed part of landholdings controlled by local ecclesiastical authorities and the Della Gherardesca family. In 1075, references mention the port in connection with the sale of coastal properties extending from the river mouth toward Punta Ala. By the 12th century, the settlement was already in decline and appears to have been largely abandoned. The harbour remained in limited use in subsequent centuries. Over time, the transformation of the coastline led to the disappearance of the original port structures, leaving only toponymic and archaeological traces in the area of Pian d'Alma and Cala Civette.

Along its course, on the slopes of the mountain, lies the Etruscan archaeological site of Poggio Tondo.
