= Abbey of Sestinga =

- Abbey of St. Bartholomew of Sestinga
- Abbazia di San Bartolomeo di Sestinga (Italian)
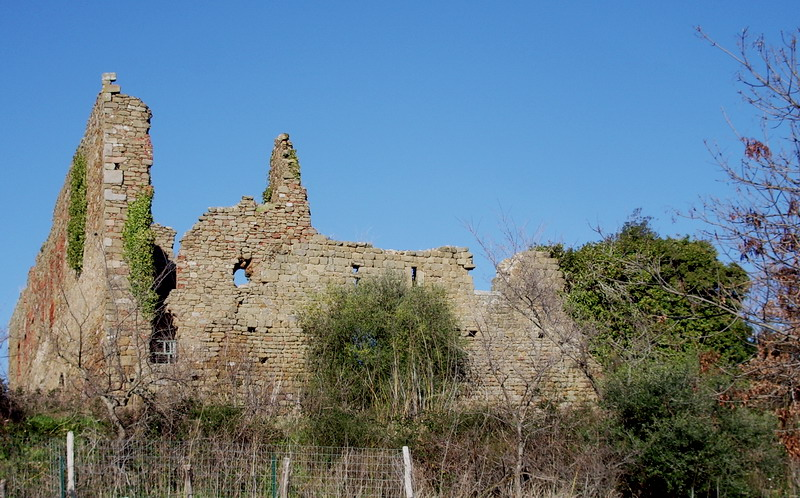
- Abbey of Sestinga
- 42°51′56.1″N 10°58′32.8″E
- Location: Località Convento, Vetulonia; Castiglione della Pescaia, Province of Grosseto, Tuscany
- Country: Italy
- Denomination: Roman Catholic

Architecture
- Architectural type: Abbey
- Style: Romanesque

The Abbey of St. Bartholomew of Sestinga (Abbazia di San Bartolomeo di Sestinga), simply known as Abbey of Sestinga (Abbazia di Sestinga) was a Benedictine monastery founded in the early 11th century in the area of Vetulonia, in Castiglione della Pescaia, Tuscany, Italy.

== History ==
The abbey is first documented in 1025, and a 1038 imperial record states that it was founded "in the time of Emperor Henry". It was established by members of the Lucchese aristocracy, notably the noble Ranieri, son of Roffrido, whose family held extensive land in the region. From an early stage, the monastery enjoyed imperial protection and significant autonomy from the bishop of Rusellae.

During the 11th century, the abbey accumulated a large patrimony through donations and land acquisitions, extending across Sestinga, the Alma valley, and other areas of southern Tuscany. By the mid-13th century, however, the institution declined and in 1258 it was placed under Augustinian control, which led to the dispersion of its assets and the loss of its political and economic importance. In 1503, Pope Alexander VI transferred it to the Augustinian convent of Siena, and it was later suppressed in the 17th century.

The original monastic complex at Badia Vecchia has not survived, and no standing remains of the 11th-century structures are visible today. The monastery was later relocated near Vetulonia, where limited remains of a 12th-century complex are preserved, including ruins of a stone-built building with a tower. The church of St. Bartholomew, still documented in the 18th century despite severe deterioration, was eventually abandoned and reduced to storage use before disappearing entirely. Its layout is known only through historical descriptions and a cadastral survey from 1824.

== Sources ==
- Citter, Carlo, ed. (2002). Guida agli edifici sacri della Maremma. Abbazie, monasteri, pievi e chiese medievali della provincia di Grosseto. Siena: Nuova Immagine. pp. 34–35.
- Santi, Bruno, ed. (1999). Grosseto, Massa Marittima e la Maremma. I luoghi della fede. Milan: Mondadori. pp. 129–130.
