= Hermits of Saint William =

The Hermits of Saint William (Williamites) were a religious community founded in the 12th century by Albert, companion and biographer of William of Maleval, and Renaldus, a physician who had settled at Maleval shortly before William's death. It followed William's practices, and quickly spread into Italy, Germany, France, Flanders and Hungary. In 1256, some houses joined the Hermits of St. Augustine, while other houses continued as a separate congregation, eventually adopting the Benedictine Rule.

== History ==
William of Maleval was a Frenchman who gave up the life of a dissolute soldier to become a hermit. After making pilgrimages to various Christian shrines, he eventually retired to live near Grosseto in Tuscany and died there in February 1157. After his death, many pilgrims visited his grave, and some remained in the area to practice his life of prayer and penitence. Albert, one of William's companions, drafted a rule which he called the Rule of St. William. They went barefoot, and fasted almost continually until in 1229, Pope Gregory IX mitigated some of their austerity and placed them under the Benedictine Rule.

Houses were established throughout central and northern Italy, and in Belgium, Germany, Bohemia and Hungary. In 1243, Pope Innocent IV issued a papal bull addressed to all Tuscan hermits, with the exception of the "Brothers of Saint William in Tuscany", calling them to unite into a single religious order following the Rule of Saint Augustine. In 1244 they became known as the Order of Saint William. At the same time many of the monasteries adopted the Benedictine Rule and others that of St. Augustine.

In 1244 the Hermits of Favali, or of Monte Favale, in the Diocese of Pesaro, joined the Williamites, but became separate in 1251. (In 1255 they merged into the Cistercian Order.)

In 1255, the priors of the Hermits of St. Augustine, those of St. William, and also some smaller groups were invited to meet in Rome, with an eye to merging them into one mendicant order. When, in 1256, Pope Alexander IV expanded the Hermits of St. Augustine, many of the Williamites withdrew from the union and were permitted to exist as a separate body under the Benedictine Rule. In 1435 the order, which about this time numbered 54 monasteries in three provinces of Tuscany, Germany and France, received from the Council of Basle the confirmation of its privileges.

The Italian monasteries suffered during the wars in Italy. Sometime after 1274, members of the Williamites who had not merged with the Hermits of St. Augustine, were given the abbey of Blancs-Manteaux in Paris, where they followed the Rule of Saint Benedict. They adopted the reforms developed in 1604 by the Congregation of St. Vanne in Lorraine as promoted in 1621 by the Abbey of Saint-Germain-des-Prés. Eventually, they joined the Congregation of Saint Maur, which was later suppressed during the French Revolution.

In the Low Countries, the Hermits of Saint William had houses in Beveren, Cambrai, and Ypres. In Germany, the chief house at Grevenbroich (founded in 1281) was united to the Cistercians in 1628; the last German house ceased to exist in 1785. Their habit was similar to that of the Cistercians.
