= Tirli =

- Frazione
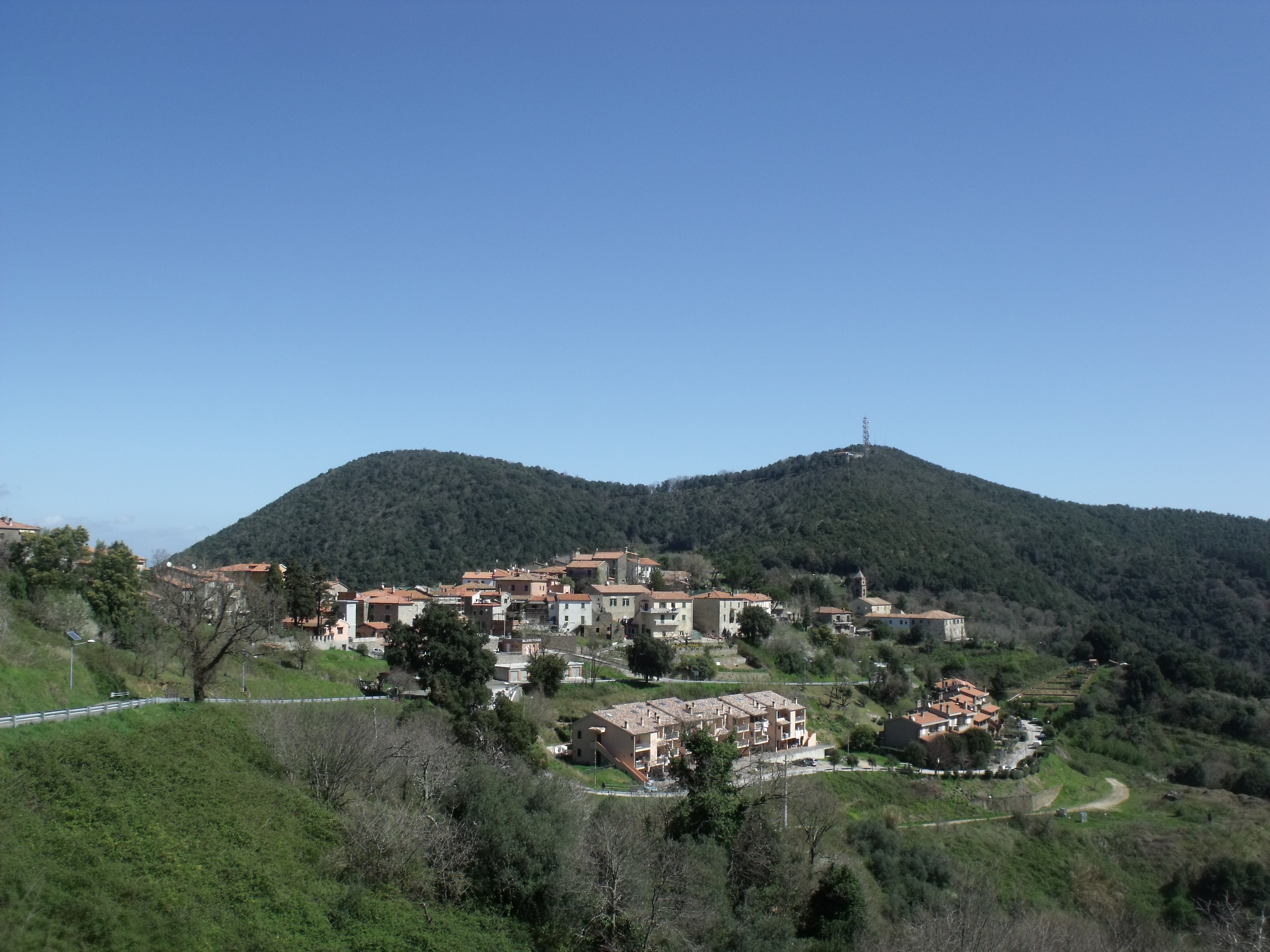
- View of Tirli

- Location of Tirli in Italy
- Coordinates: 42°50′43″N 10°53′42″E
- Country: Italy
- Region: Tuscany
- Province: Grosseto (GR)
- Comune: Castiglione della Pescaia
- Elevation: 404 m (1,325 ft)

Population (2011)
  - Total: 255
- Demonym: Tirlesi
- Time zone: UTC+1 (CET)
  - Summer (DST): UTC+2 (CEST)
- Postal code: 58043
- Dialing code: (+39) 0564

Tirli is a village in Tuscany, central Italy, administratively a frazione of the comune of Castiglione della Pescaia, province of Grosseto. At the time of the 2001 census its population amounted to 284.

Tirli is about 28 km from Grosseto and 18 km from Castiglione della Pescaia, and it is situated on a hill next to the peak of Poggio Ballone.

== History ==
The village dates back to the Early Middle Ages, as it was mentioned in a document of 814. Destroyed by the Turks in the 16th century, it was then part of the Principality of Piombino.

== Main sights ==
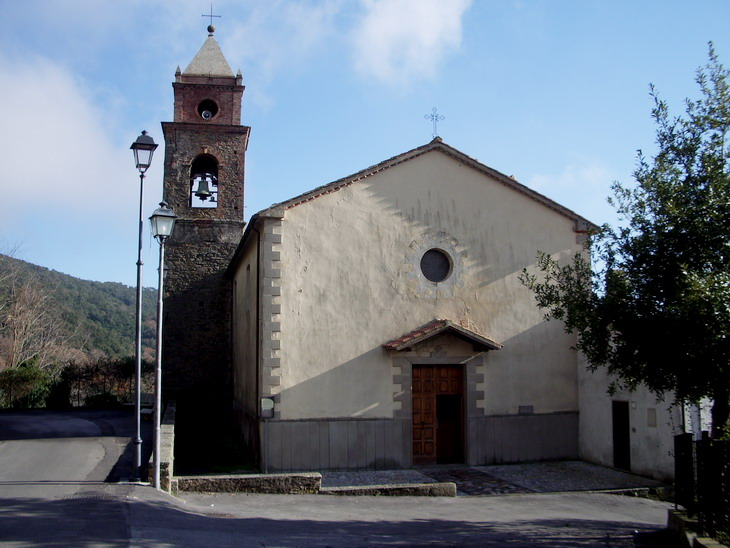
The church of Sant'Andrea Apostolo

- Church of Sant'Andrea Apostolo (17th century), main parish church of the village, it was consecrated in 1674. The former convent of Sant'Agostino is situated next to the church.
- Hermitage of San Guglielmo di Malavalle (13th century), situated in the woods near the village. It was built between 1230 and 1249 as a sanctuary where saint William of Maleval was buried.
- Hermitage of Sant'Anna (17th century), located in the woods of Tirli.
- Palazzo Pretorio (18th century).

== Bibliography ==
- Bruno Santi, Guida storico-artistica alla Maremma. Itinerari culturali nella provincia di Grosseto, Siena, Nuova Immagine, 1995, pp. 83–84.
- Enrico Collura, Mario Innocenti, Stefano Innocenti, Comune di Castiglione della Pescaia: briciole di storia, Grosseto, Editrice Innocenti, 2002, pp. 176–187.
- Fiorenzo Corsali, Storia della Maremma. Castiglione della Pescaia e il suo territorio, Roma, Aldo Sara Editore, 2008, pp. 65–69, 103–106.

== See also ==
- Buriano, Castiglione della Pescaia
- Pian d'Alma
- Pian di Rocca
- Punta Ala
- Roccamare
- Rocchette
- Vetulonia
