= Rocchette =

- Frazione
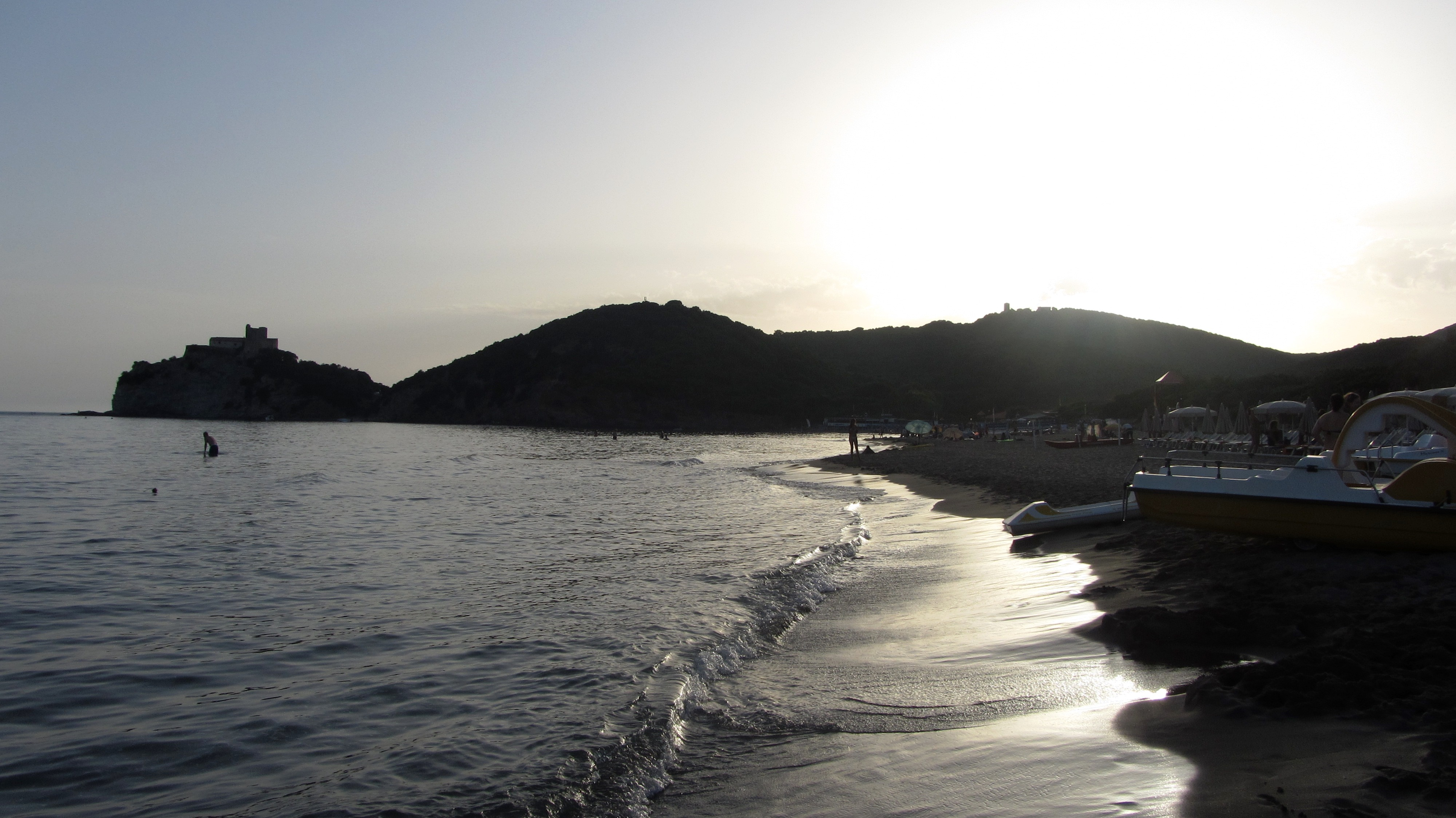
- View of the beach of Rocchette at sunset

- Location of Rocchette in Italy
- Coordinates: 42°46′37″N 10°47′35″E
- Country: Italy
- Region: Tuscany
- Province: Grosseto (GR)
- Comune: Castiglione della Pescaia
- Elevation: 6 m (20 ft)

Population (2011)
  - Total: 9
- Time zone: UTC+1 (CET)
  - Summer (DST): UTC+2 (CEST)
- Postal code: 58043
- Dialing code: (+39) 0564

Rocchette is a coastal village (frazione) of the municipality of Castiglione della Pescaia, in the province of Grosseto, Tuscany, central Italy. Located on the Tyrrhenian coast at the foot of the Punta Ala promontory, it is a popular seaside resort known for its beach, campsites, pine forests, and the historic Fort Rocchette.

== Geography ==
Rocchette is situated about 6 km northwest of Castiglione della Pescaia and approximately 25 km northwest of Grosseto. The village lies on the south-eastern slopes of Poggio Peroni (346 m), one of the hills forming the Punta Ala promontory, along the Tyrrhenian coast. The historic fort stands on the Punta delle Rocchette headland overlooking the sea, while the modern settlement extends inland along the provincial road connecting Castiglione della Pescaia and Follonica. The surrounding area is characterized by Mediterranean pine forests, including the nearby Roccamare pinewood.

The beach of Rocchette is one of the best-known beaches on the Tuscan coast. It consists of several hundred metres of sandy shoreline bordered by reddish rocky outcrops and is noted for its clear waters and gently sloping seabed. The area has repeatedly received environmental recognition for water quality and coastal conservation.

== History ==
The area was historically known as Campo Albo, a name documented throughout the Middle Ages. During the second half of the 12th century, a parish church (pieve) belonging to the bishops of Grosseto was established near the settlement.

A papal bull issued in 1188 records both the church and a watchtower built to oversee the nearby harbour of Rocchette. The church continued to be mentioned in ecclesiastical records during the late 13th and early 14th centuries, when it was associated with Abbey of Sant'Antimo. Both the church and the harbour were eventually abandoned, probably between the late medieval and early Renaissance periods. The watchtower, however, remained in use and was gradually enlarged. In 1289 the fortification was recorded as Rocchetta de Capalbo, and during the 16th century it was transformed into a substantial coastal fortress under the rule of the House of Medici.

From the 1960s onward, Rocchette experienced significant tourist development, with the construction of villas, campsites, holiday facilities and beach resorts. Today it is one of the most visited summer destinations on the coast of the Maremma, attracting visitors from across Italy and Northern Europe.

== Landmarks ==
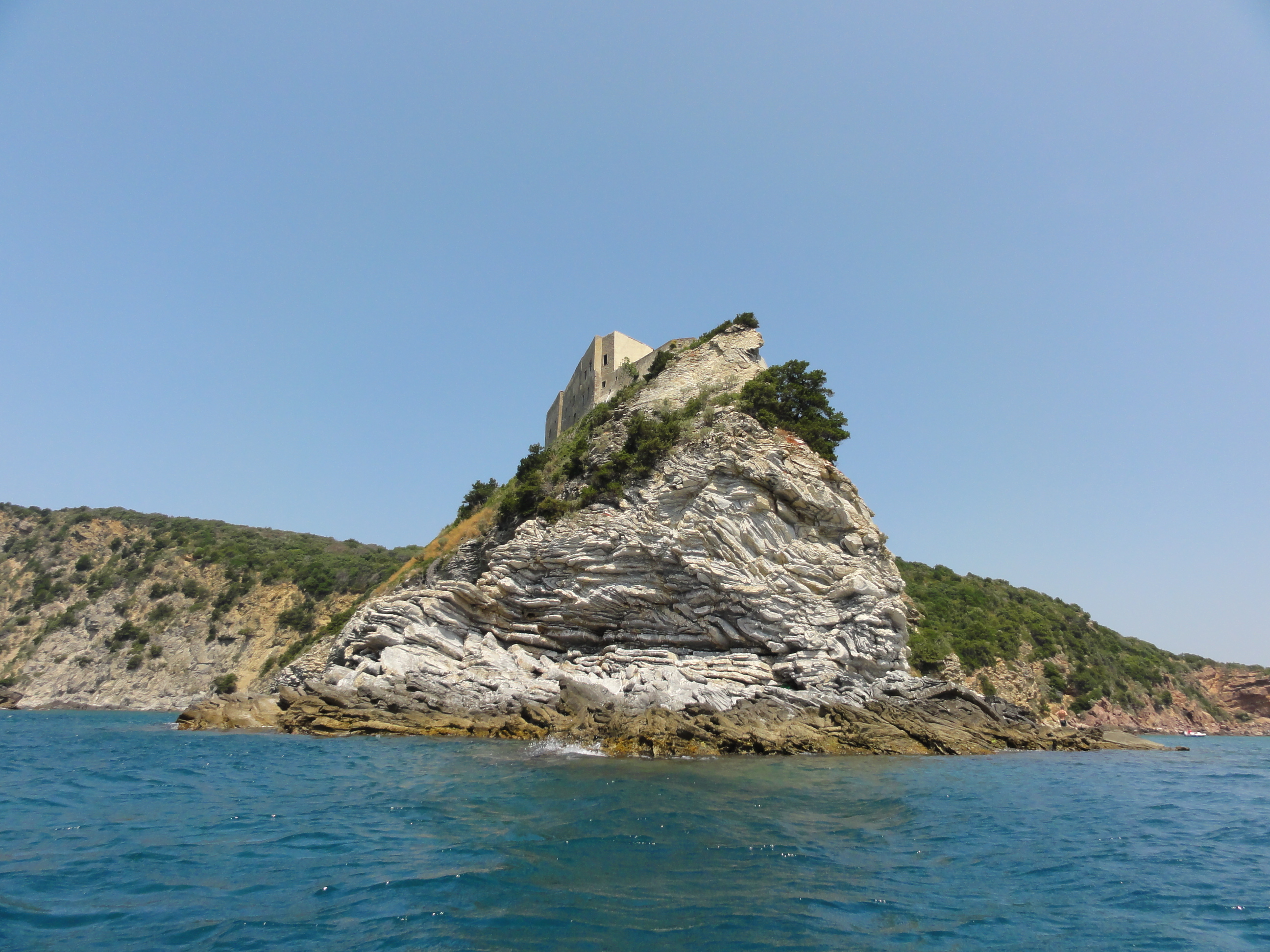
Fort Rocchette

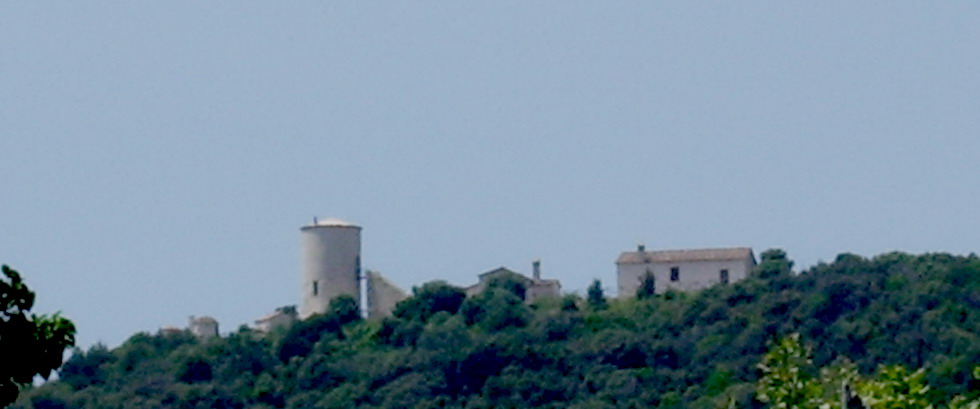
The Tower of Cala Galera

Dominating the rocky headland overlooking the Tyrrhenian Sea, Fort Rocchette (Forte delle Rocchette) is the most significant historic monument of the area. Originally built as a watchtower in the twelfth century and documented in a papal bull of 1188 as Rocca di Campo Albo, it was enlarged in the sixteenth century under Cosimo I de' Medici as part of Tuscany's coastal defense system. After the unification of Italy, the fort was converted into a lighthouse and later passed into private ownership. Nearby is the chapel of Madonna del Carmine, an eighteenth-century church probably built to replace the medieval pieve.

Other historic sites include the Tower of Cala Galera, a thirteenth-century Pisan watchtower later restored by the Grand Dukes of Tuscany, and the chapel of Serignano, a small rural chapel commissioned by marquis Lorenzo Niccolini and built in 1954.

== Sources ==
- Collura, Enrico; Innocenti, Mario; Innocenti, Stefano (2002). Comune di Castiglione della Pescaia: briciole di storia. Grosseto: Editrice Innocenti. pp. 145–148.
- Guerrini, Giuseppe, ed. (1999). Torri e castelli della Provincia di Grosseto. Siena: Nuova Immagine.
- (in Italian) Emanuele Repetti, «Rocchette », Dizionario Geografico Fisico Storico della Toscana, 1833–1846.
- Bruno Santi, Guida storico-artistica alla Maremma. Itinerari culturali nella provincia di Grosseto, Siena, Nuova Immagine, 1995, pp. 78–81.

== See also ==
- Buriano
- Pian d'Alma
- Pian di Rocca
- Punta Ala
- Roccamare
- Tirli
- Vetulonia
