= Pian di Rocca =

- Frazione
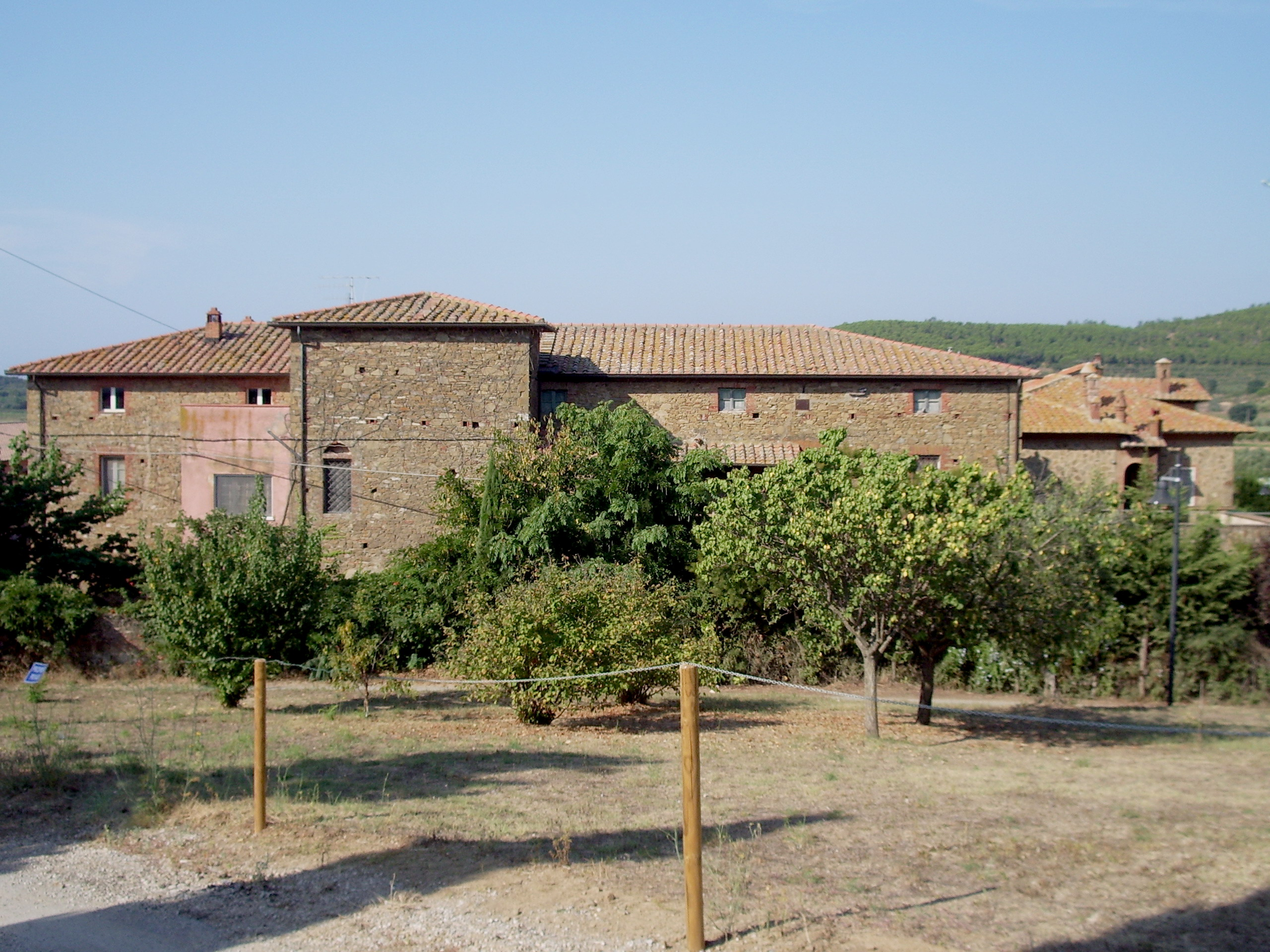
- The farm of Pian di Rocca

- Location of Pian di Rocca in Italy
- Coordinates: 42°47′25″N 10°49′24″E
- Country: Italy
- Region: Tuscany
- Province: Grosseto (GR)
- Comune: Castiglione della Pescaia
- Elevation: 13 m (43 ft)

Population (2011)
  - Total: 203
- Demonym: Piandirocchini
- Time zone: UTC+1 (CET)
  - Summer (DST): UTC+2 (CEST)
- Postal code: 58043
- Dialing code: (+39) 0564

Pian di Rocca is a village in Tuscany, central Italy, administratively a frazione of the comune of Castiglione della Pescaia, province of Grosseto. At the time of the 2001 census its population amounted to 68.

Pian di Rocca is about 25 km from Grosseto and 7 km from Castiglione della Pescaia, and it is situated in the plain of Val Berretta, between the hills of Poggio Ballone and Poggio Peroni.

The village is known for its typical product, the Carciofo di Pian di Rocca (artichoke of Pian di Rocca).

== Main sights ==
- Santa Rita (18th century), main church of the village, it was built as the chapel of the farmhouse, and it was restructured in the early 20th century.
- Hermitage of Santa Petronilla (15th century), situated outside the village, it was built as a place of pilgrimage. The church was suppressed in 1782. It's now in ruins.
- Farm of Pian di Rocca (18th century), elegant farmhouse built in the late 18th century, it is composed by a manor house, a farm and a courtyard, which is now the centre of the village.
- Archaeological site of Val Berretta: Etruscan necropolis of the 4th century BC.

== Bibliography ==
- Aldo Mazzolai, Guida della Maremma. Percorsi tra arte e natura, Le Lettere, Florence, 1997

== See also ==
- Buriano, Castiglione della Pescaia
- Pian d'Alma
- Punta Ala
- Roccamare
- Rocchette
- Tirli
- Vetulonia
