= Roccamare =

- Frazione
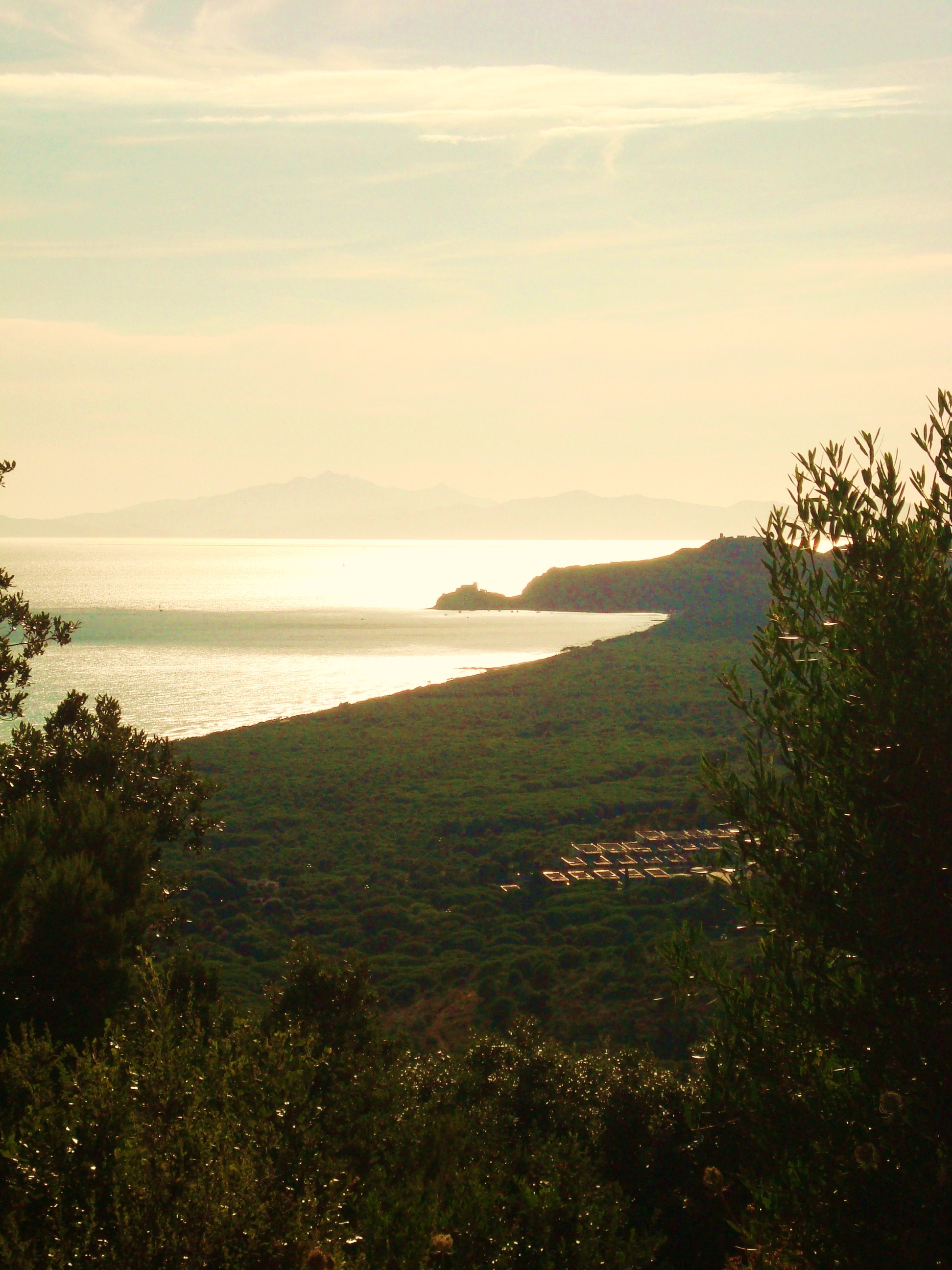
- The pinewood of Roccamare

- Location of Roccamare in Italy
- Coordinates: 42°46′32″N 10°49′24″E
- Country: Italy
- Region: Tuscany
- Province: Grosseto (GR)
- Comune: Castiglione della Pescaia
- Elevation: 6 m (20 ft)

Population (2011)
  - Total: 63
- Time zone: UTC+1 (CET)
  - Summer (DST): UTC+2 (CEST)
- Postal code: 58043
- Dialing code: (+39) 0564

Roccamare is a seaside residential village and gated community in the municipality of Castiglione della Pescaia, in the province of Grosseto, Tuscany, central Italy. Developed during the second half of the 20th century, it is known for its extensive pine forest, private villas, and examples of modern Italian architecture. At the time of the 2001 census its population was 107.

== Geography ==
Roccamare is located about 5 km north of Castiglione della Pescaia and approximately 24 km northwest of Grosseto, on the Tyrrhenian coast of Tuscany. The village lies within a large coastal pine forest stretching between Castiglione della Pescaia and Rocchette. The area is crossed by the Tonfone stream, a short watercourse that flows into the sea near the local beach.

The pine forest is dominated by maritime pines, alongside typical Mediterranean scrub vegetation. Historically, the area formed part of the marshlands surrounding the now-vanished Lake Prile and acquired its present appearance following extensive land reclamation works carried out between the 18th and 20th centuries.

== History ==
Roccamare is a planned residential settlement that emerged in the decades following the reclamation of the Maremma wetlands. The village was established in the early 1960s as a private seaside community on the initiative of count Federigo Ginori Conti, who conceived and financed the development. Conceived as a low-density residential enclave integrated into the existing pine forest, the project combined environmental preservation with modern architectural design.

The original development consisted of approximately two hundred villas connected by a network of private roads and pedestrian paths. Most of the residences were designed by architects Ugo Miglietta and Antonio Canali. Additional contributions were made by architects such as Ernesto Nathan Rogers, Roberto Monsani, Luigi and Giancarlo Bicocchi, and Lisindo Baldassini.

== Landmarks ==
While Roccamare contains no major historic monuments, it is distinguished by a number of architecturally notable villas dating from the second half of the 20th century. Among the most prominent is Villa Bartolini, designed by Ernesto Nathan Rogers between 1957 and 1958 as a modern reinterpretation of traditional Maremman rural architecture. The villa has been recognized by the Italian cultural heritage authorities for its architectural significance.

Other notable buildings include Villa Bertini and Villa Verusio (1962), designed by Roberto Monsani, Luigi and Giancarlo Bicocchi, and Lisindo Baldassini, which are characterized by extensive glazing and a close relationship between interior spaces and the surrounding forest. Villa Fraschetti (1965) and Casa dei Pini (1972), by the same designers, further developed these architectural themes through innovative use of modular structures and open-plan designs. The later Villa Settepassi, completed in 1986 from a design by Pier Niccolò Berardi, incorporates elements of Mediterranean vernacular architecture.

A small chapel serving the residential community was built in 1970 to a design by Ugo Miglietta and remains in use during the summer season.

== Tourism ==
Since the second half of the 20th century, Roccamare has become known as an exclusive summer destination. Its secluded setting within a private pine forest and its gated layout have contributed to its reputation as a discreet retreat for public figures and members of the Italian and international cultural, political, and artistic elite.

Among its most notable frequent visitors was the writer Italo Calvino, who spent his summers in Roccamare from the 1970s until 1985; the surrounding landscape also influenced parts of his novel Mr. Palomar. Other literary figures linked to the area include Pietro Citati, who introduced Calvino to Roccamare and later died there in 2022, as well as Carlo Fruttero, whose thriller novel An Enigma by the Sea is set in the gated community.

Roccamare has additionally hosted numerous prominent figures from the arts, business, and politics, including Sophia Loren, Roger Moore, Carlo Ponti, Georg Solti, Romano Prodi, Giovanni Veronesi and Siegmund George Warburg.

== Bibliography ==
- Marco Del Francia, Walter Di Salvo. Poetiche wrightiane in Maremma, in "Architetture Grosseto", n. 4–5, Pisa, ETS, 2008, pp. 39–40.

== See also ==
- Buriano, Castiglione della Pescaia
- Pian d'Alma
- Pian di Rocca
- Punta Ala
- Rocchette
- Tirli
- Vetulonia
