= Cala Civette =

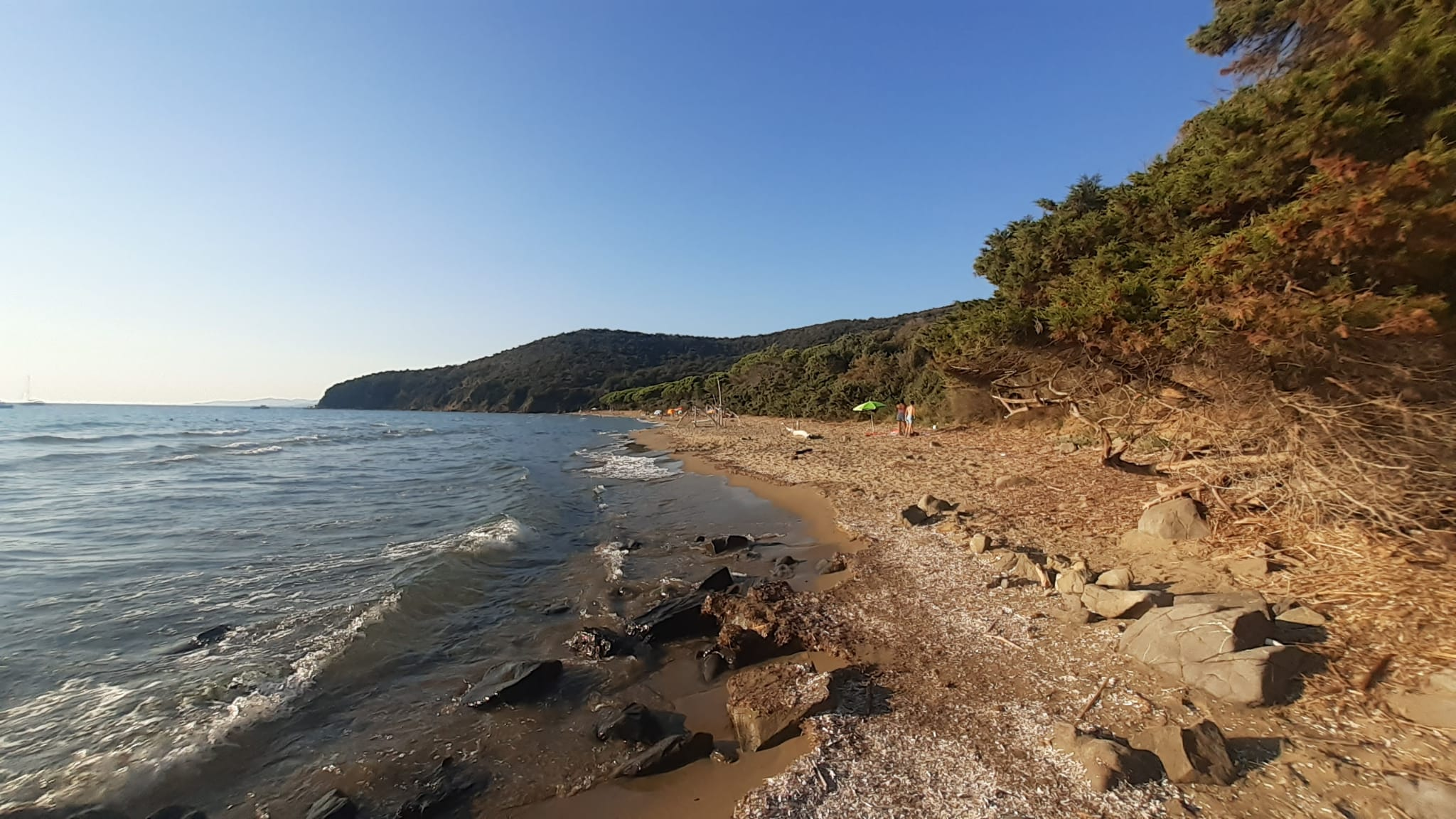
- Interactive map of Cala Civette
- Location: Scarlino, Province of Grosseto, Tuscany
- Type: Inlet
- Part of: Gulf of Follonica, Tyrrhenian Sea
- Basin countries: Italy

Cala Civette (or Cala Le Donne) is a coastal inlet in the Maremma region of southern Tuscany, Italy, located at the southern end of the Bandite di Scarlino, just before the beginning of the sandy coastline of Punta Ala in the municipality of Castiglione della Pescaia. It is bounded to the north by Punta Le Canne, which separates it from Cala Violina, and to the south by the mouth of the Alma River.

The inlet, about 500 metres long, features fine light-coloured sand and gently sloping, clear waters. It is backed by a pine forest mixed with Mediterranean vegetation and is noted for its marine life, including seagrass beds close to the shore. Access to Cala Civette is on foot from the Pian d'Alma road.

Cala Civette is overlooked by the promontory of Torre Civette, where a former coastal tower stands. The structure was rebuilt in the 16th century and served as part of the defensive system of the Principality of Piombino. It underwent restoration works in the 18th century and was decommissioned in the first half of the 19th century. The former fortification was later converted into a private residence and incorporated into a nearby estate.

The cove lies near the mouth of the Alma River, in an area historically associated with the former small harbour known as Porto d'Alma or Porto Civette, which served as a minor landing place in the medieval and early modern periods.
