= Vetulonia =

- Frazione
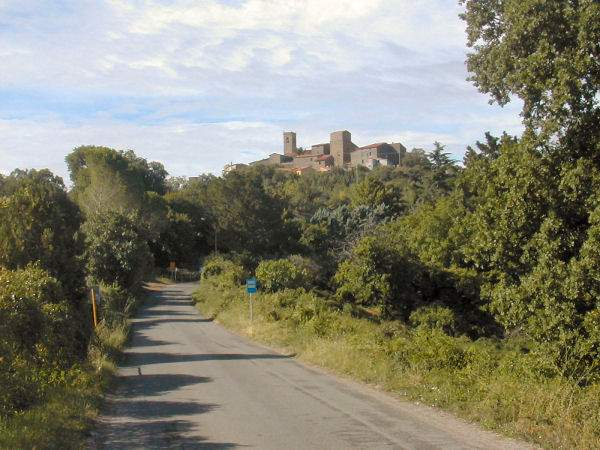
- View of Vetulonia

- Location of Vetulonia in Italy
- Coordinates: 42°51′34″N 10°58′16″E
- Country: Italy
- Region: Tuscany
- Province: Grosseto (GR)
- Comune: Castiglione della Pescaia
- Elevation: 335 m (1,099 ft)

Population (2011)
  - Total: 254
- Demonym: Vetuloniesi
- Time zone: UTC+1 (CET)
  - Summer (DST): UTC+2 (CEST)
- Postal code: 58043
- Dialing code: (+39) 0564

Vetulonia, formerly called Vetulonium (Etruscan: Vatluna), was an ancient city of Etruria, Italy, the site of which is partially occupied by the modern village of Vetulonia, which up to 1887 bore the name of Colonnata and Colonna di Buriano: the site is currently a frazione of the comune of Castiglione della Pescaia (province of Grosseto) with some 400 inhabitants.

It lies 300m above sea level, about ten miles directly northwest of Grosseto, on the northeast side of the hills which project from the flat Maremma and form the promontory of Castiglione.

The archaeological park contains remains of the Etruscan city.

== History and main sights ==
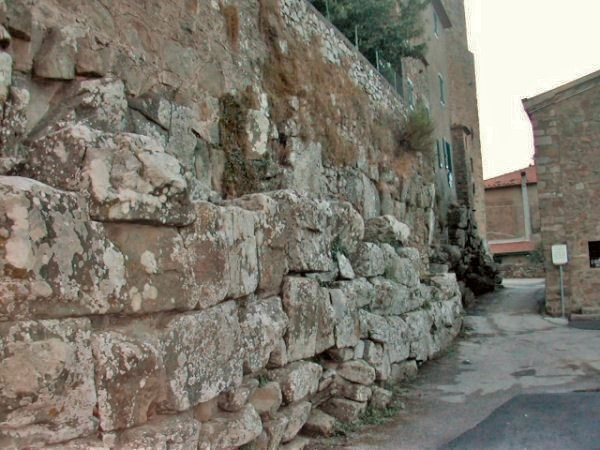
Cyclopean wall of the Mura dell'Arce

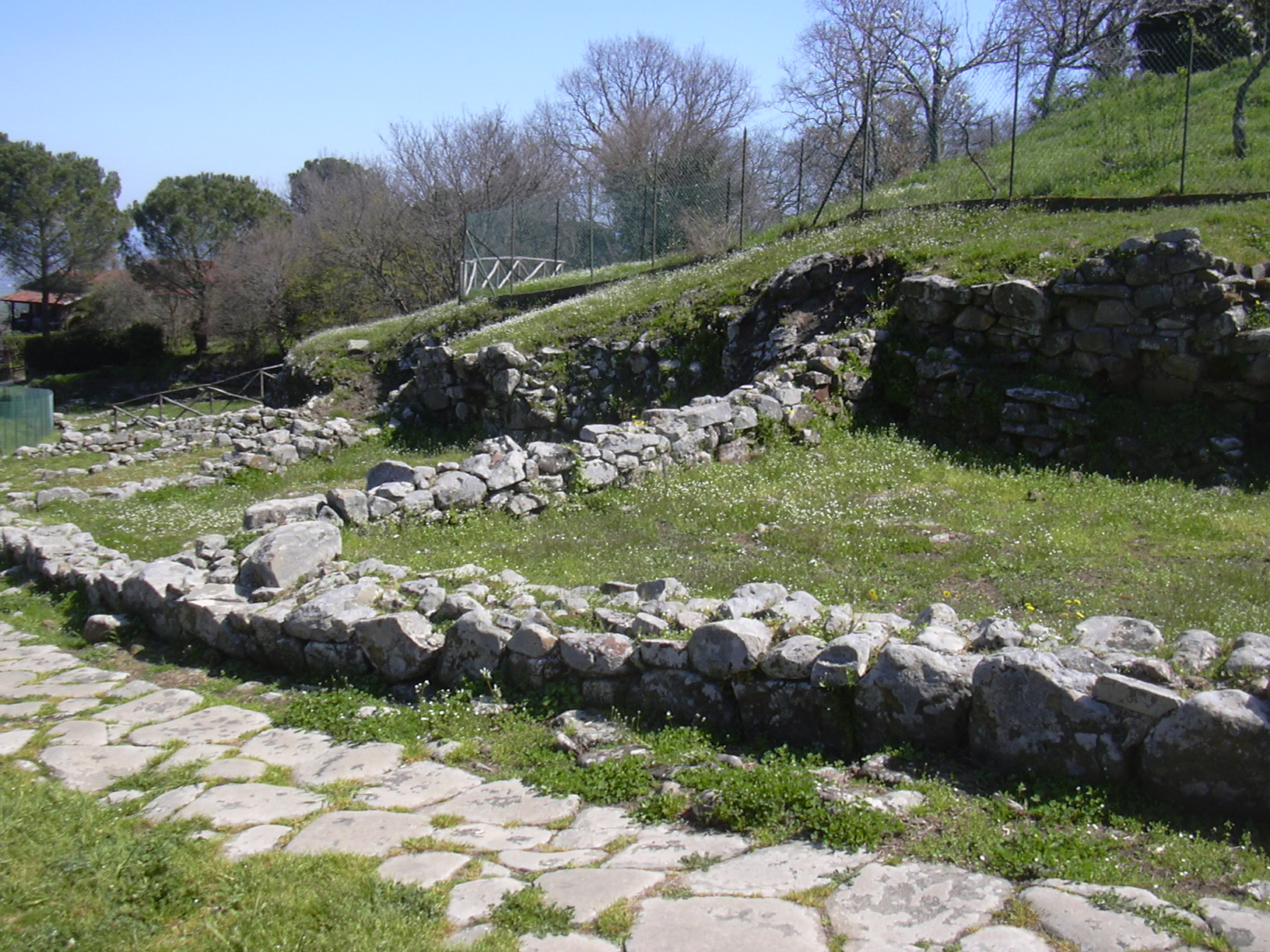
Atrium houses

Vetulonia has Etruscan origins. It was, by 600 BC, part of the Etruscan League of twelve cities. Dionysius of Halicarnassus places the city within the Latin alliance against Rome in the seventh century BC. According to Silius Italicus, the Romans adopted their magisterial insignia, the Lictors' rods and fasces and the curule seat, from Vetulonia; in 1898, a tomb in the necropolis was discovered with a bundle of iron rods with a double-headed axe in the centre, and soon afterwards, a grave stela inscribed for Avele Feluske was discovered, on which the fasces were pictured. Pliny the Elder and Ptolemy also mention the town. The rich votive furnishing from the two extensive necropoleis attest to the importance of Vetulonia's elite.

The Mura dell'Arce (cyclopean walls) date probably from the 6th-5th century BC, and aerial photography has revealed further stretches, which show the political and commercial importance of Vetulonia, which was famous for its goldsmiths.

Under the Roman Empire, however, it shrank to a secondary centre, with the northward spread of malaria.

Little is known also about medieval Vetulonia: first fought over by the abbots of San Bartolomeo di Sestinga and the Lambardi family of Buriano, it was acquired by the commune of Massa Marittima in 1323. Nine years later it was handed over to Siena.

== The site ==
The site of the ancient city was not identified before 1881. The Etruscan city situated on the hill of Colonna di Buriano, where there are remains of city walls of massive limestone, in almost horizontal courses, was accompanied by two necropoleis partly excavated by Isidoro Falchi in 1885-86; the town was renamed Vetulonia by royal decree in 1887.

The objects discovered in its extensive seventh-century necropolis, where over 1,000 tombs have been excavated, are now in the museums of Grosseto and Florence. The most important tombs, in this "richest and most interesting tomb group of northern Etruria", were covered by tumuli, which still form a prominent feature in the landscape.

Recent excavations have found a palace, the Domus dei Dolia and in 2026 a large cistern with its drainage system as well as the main access to the domus from the Ciclopi road using a peculiar arrangement of the road around a tomb in a singular fan shape.

An archaeological museum, the Museo Isidoro Falchi, was opened in 2000.

== See also ==
- Buriano, Castiglione della Pescaia
- Pian d'Alma
- Pian di Rocca
- Punta Ala
- Roccamare
- Rocchette
- Tirli
