= William of Maleval =

Roman Catholic saint

William of Maleval San Guillermo, San Gugliemo
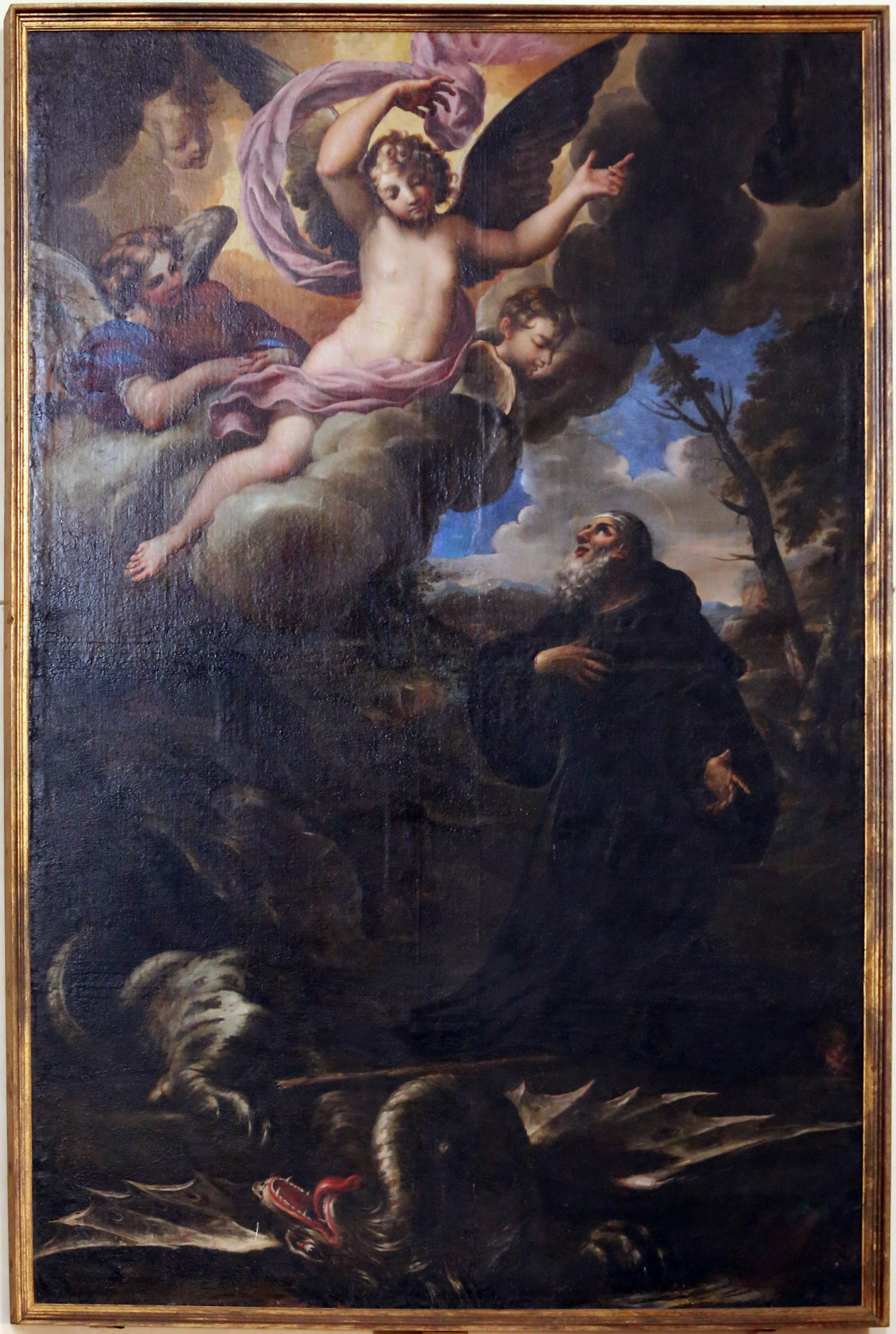
- San Guglielmo by Antonio Nasini

Hermit
- Born: Poitiers, France
- Died: 10 February 1157; Maleval
- Venerated in: Roman Catholic Church
- Canonized: 8 May 1202, Rome, Papal States by Pope Innocent III
- Major shrine: Laoag City
- Feast: 10 February
- Attributes: cross; skull
- Patronage: Laoag City, Ilocos Norte, Talisay, Batangas, Bacolor, Pampanga, Buting, Pasig, Dalaguete, Cebu, Catmon, Cebu, Magsingal, Ilocos Sur

William of Maleval (French: Guillaume de Malavalle), also known as William the Hermit or William the Great, was a Roman Catholic Frenchman and the founder of the Hermits of Saint William, an early branch of the Hermits of Saint Augustine.

Known for his Catholic piety and righteous conduct, Pope Innocent III beatified him in 8 May 1202.

== Sources ==
The account of his life, written by his disciple Albert, who lived with him during his last year at Maleval, has been lost. Written accounts of his life by Theodobald, or Thibault, given by the Bollandists, is unreliable because it has been interpolated with the lives of at least two other Williams.

== Life ==
A Frenchman by birth, he spent some years in a dissolute life in the military. After a number of chapters in which Theodobald confuses him with St. William of Gellone, Duke of Aquitaine, he says that William went to Rome, where he had an interview with Pope Eugene III, who ordered him to make a pilgrimage to Jerusalem in penance for his sins.

Though Theodobald's account of his interview with the pope does not carry conviction, the fact of this visit and his subsequent pilgrimage to Jerusalem is supported by excerpts from the older life, which are preserved by responsories and antiphons in his liturgical feast Office. He seems to have remained at Jerusalem for one or two years, not nine as Theodobald relates.

About 1153 he returned to Tuscany, sometimes living as a hermit, sometimes as a member of a religious community. At first he led a hermit's life in a wood near Pisa. He was prevailed upon to undertake the government of a monastery in the area, but being unsuccessful in attempting to reform the monks tepidity and indolence, he retired first to Monte Pruno, and finally in 1155 in the desert valley of Stabulum Rodis, later known as Maleval, in the territory of Castiglione della Pescaia, Diocese of Grosseto, where he was joined by Albert.

He died on 10 February 1157 (his feast day). His cult soon spread throughout much of Tuscany, and he was canonized in 1202. After his death, two of his followers formed the Order of Saint William, which later joined the Augustinians.

== Veneration ==
William is the patron saint of Castiglione della Pescaia. William is honored by the Augustinians, who founded a number of parishes in the Philippines named for him.

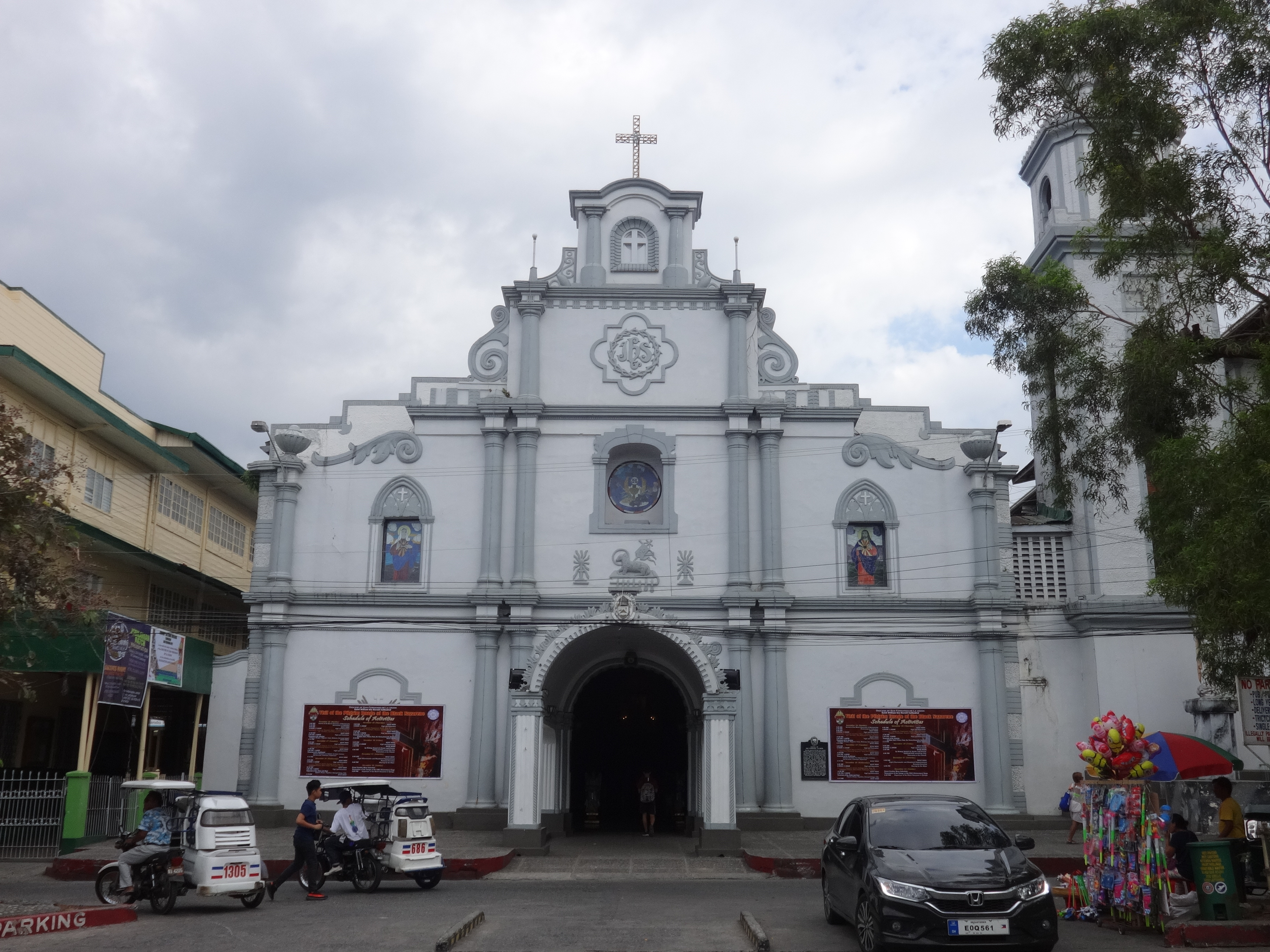
Cathedral of Saint William the Hermit, San Fernando, La Union

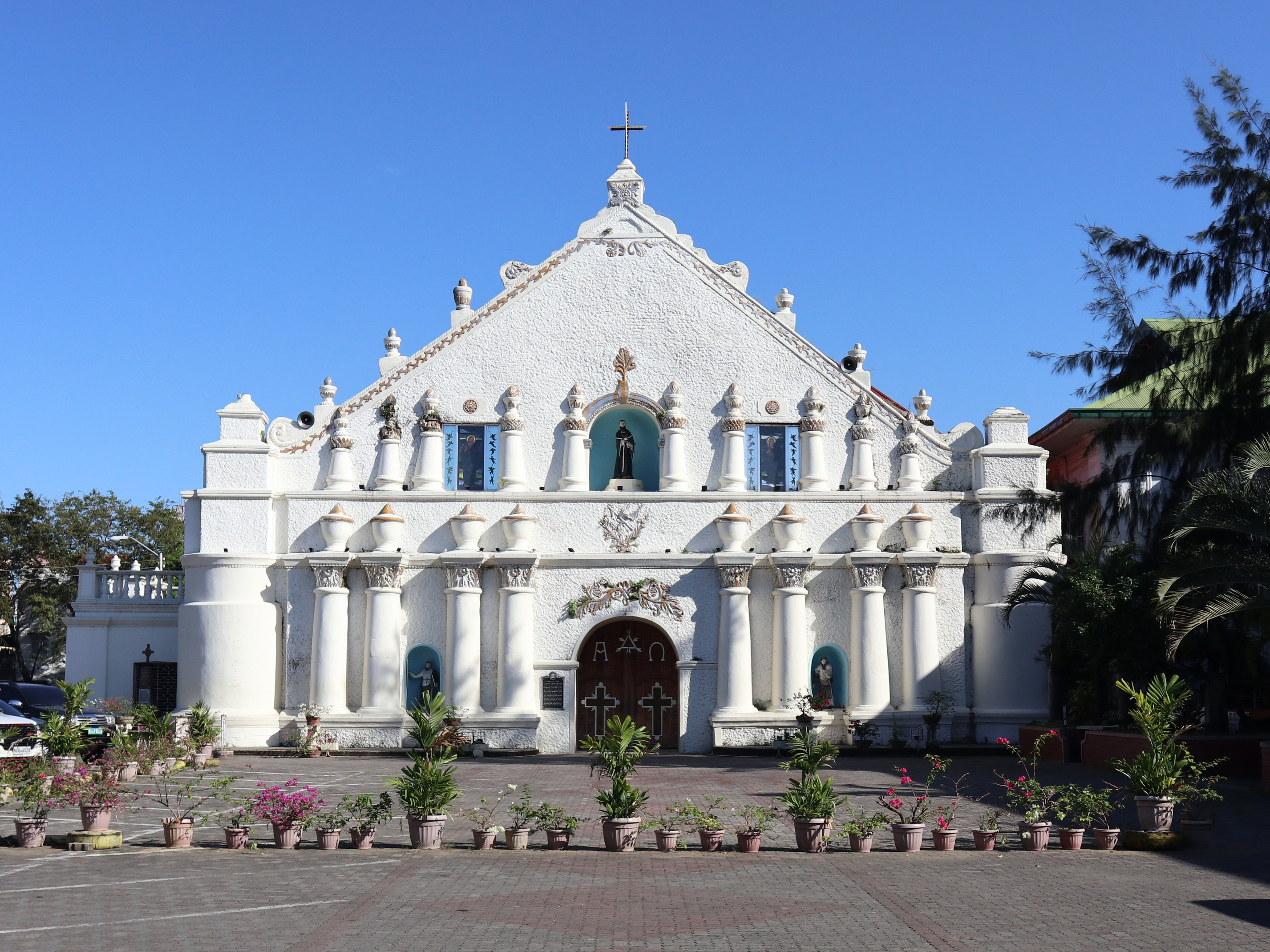
Saint William's Cathedral, Laoag, Ilocos Norte

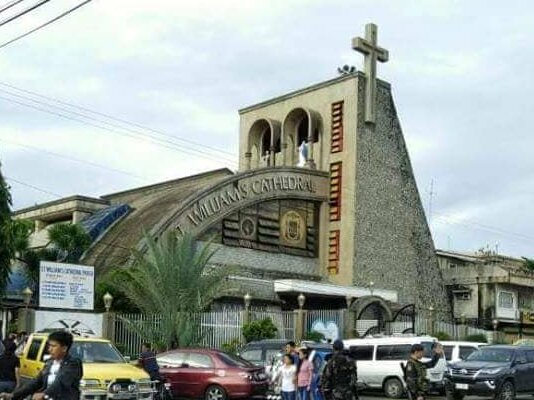
St. William the Hermit Cathedral Parish, Bulanao, Tabuk, Kalinga

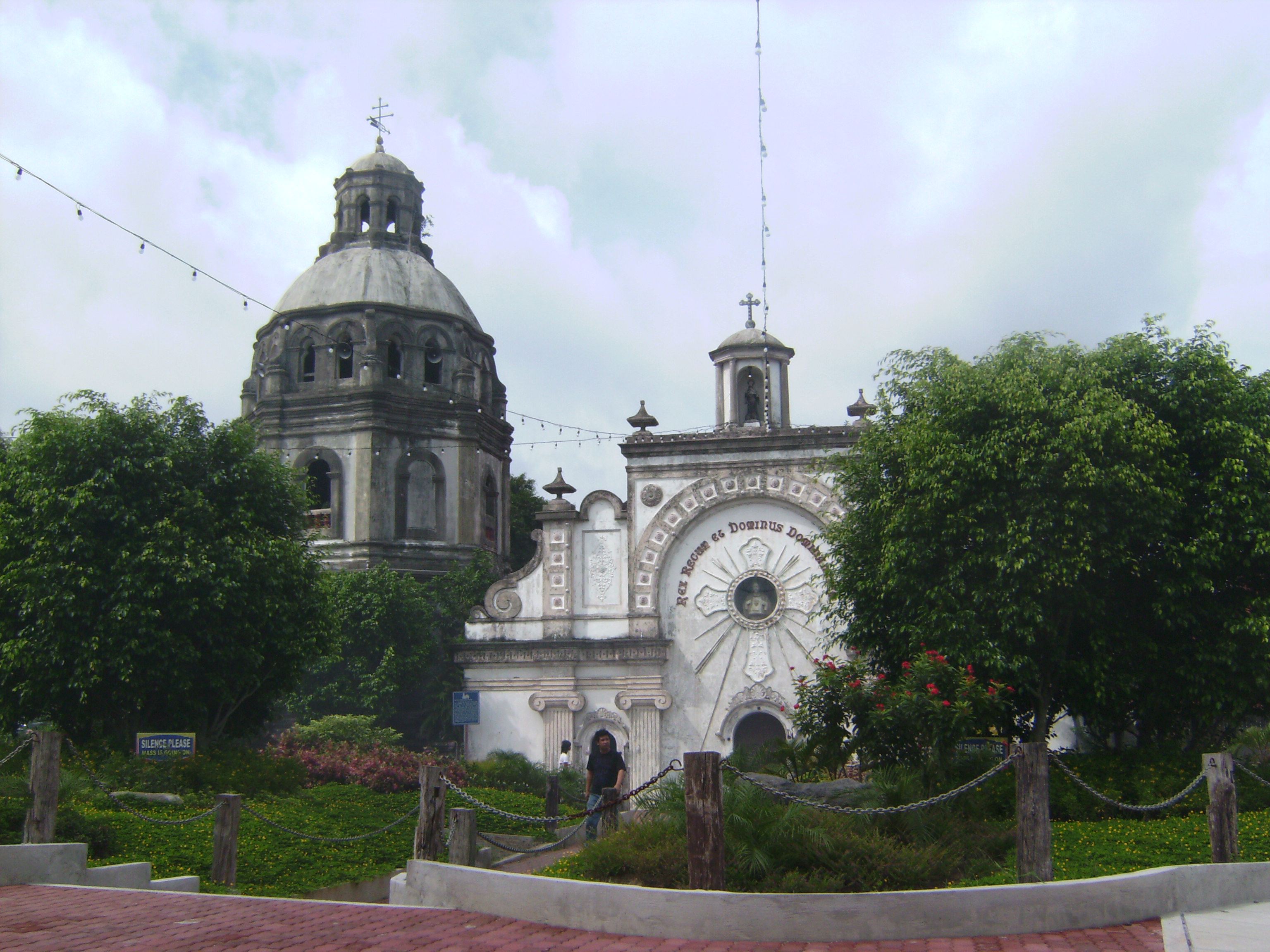
San Guillermo Parish Church, Bacolor, Pampanga

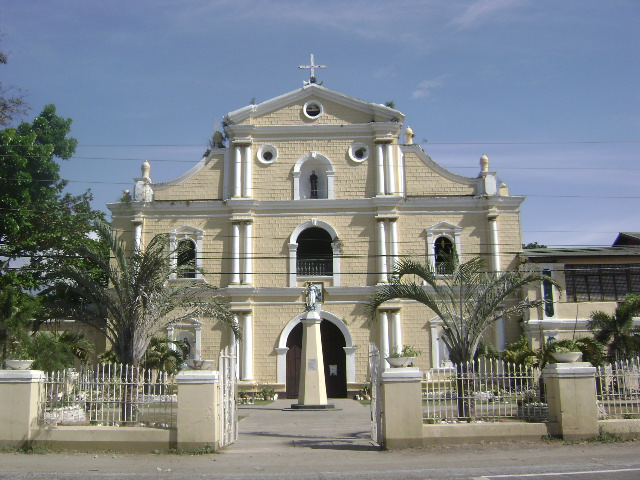
St. William the Hermit Church, Magsingal, Ilocos Sur, a National Cultural Treasure of the Philippines

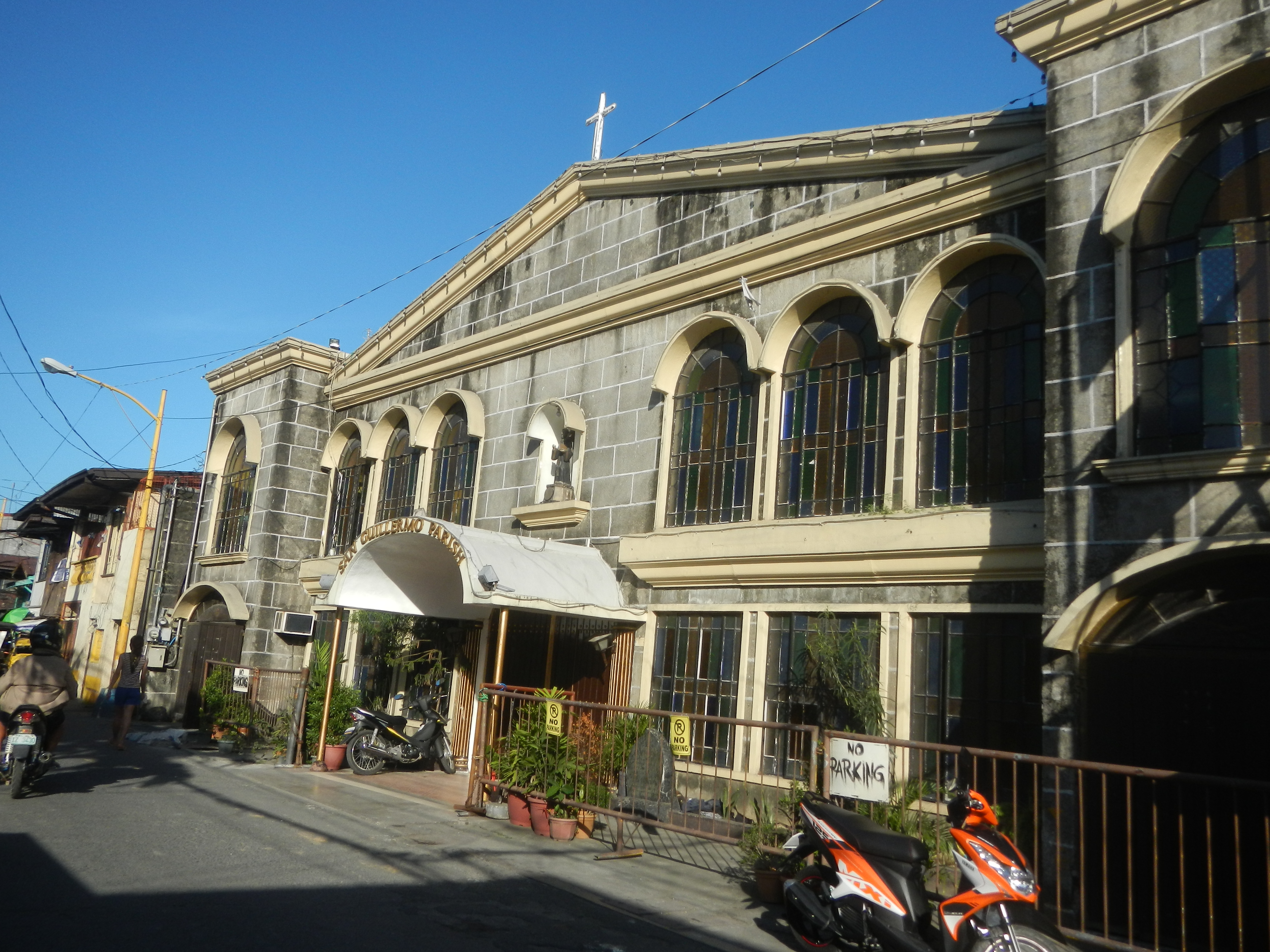
San Guillermo de Maleval Parish, Buting, Pasig, Metro Manila

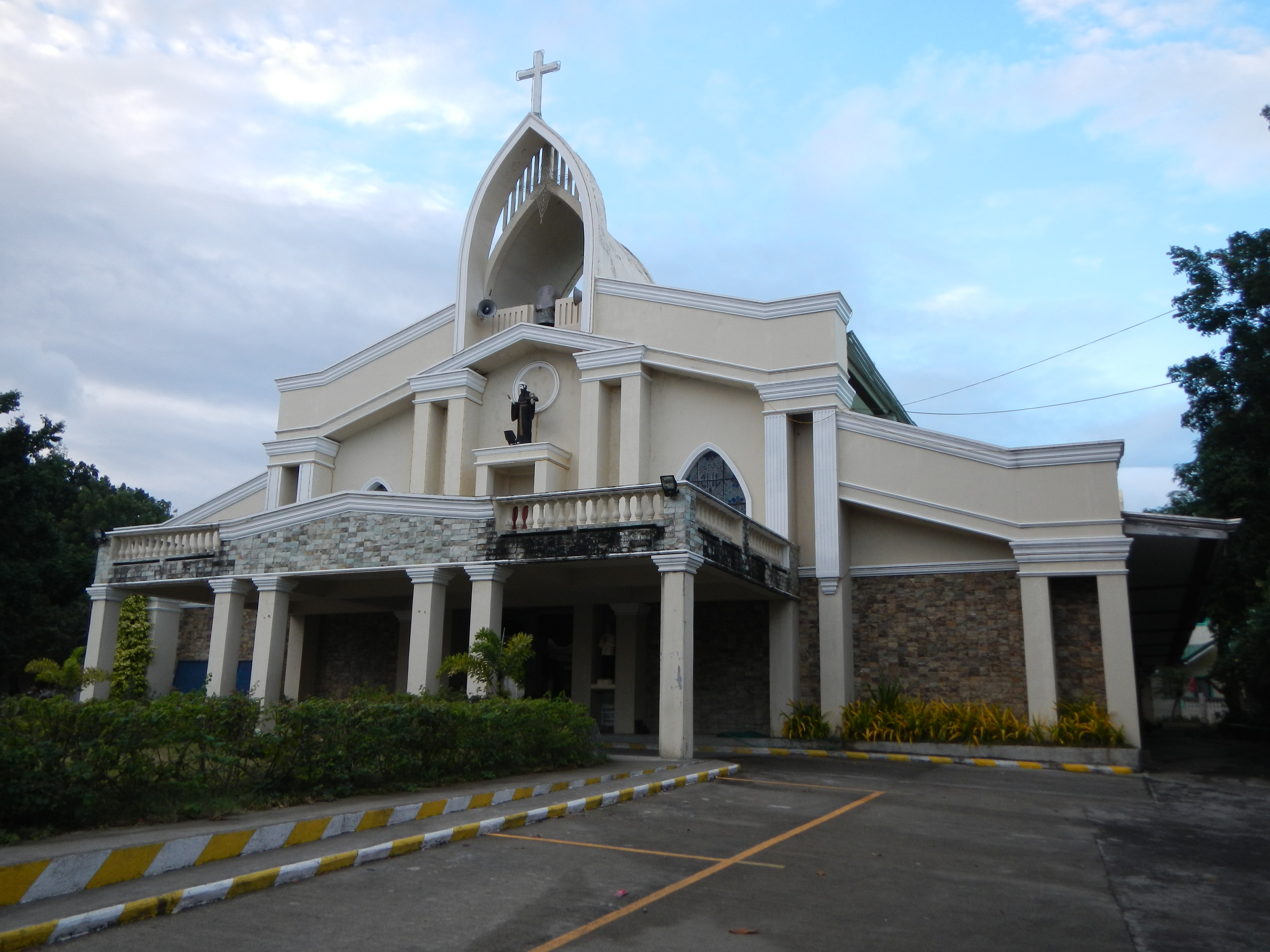
San Guillermo Parish, Talisay, Batangas

Other churches include:

- Parish of St. William of Maleval, Passi City, Iloilo, Philippines
- San Guillermo de Maleval Parish, Iponan, Cagayan de Oro, Philippines

== See also ==
- Hermits of Saint William
