= Punta Ala =

Punta Ala Punta Ala
- Frazione
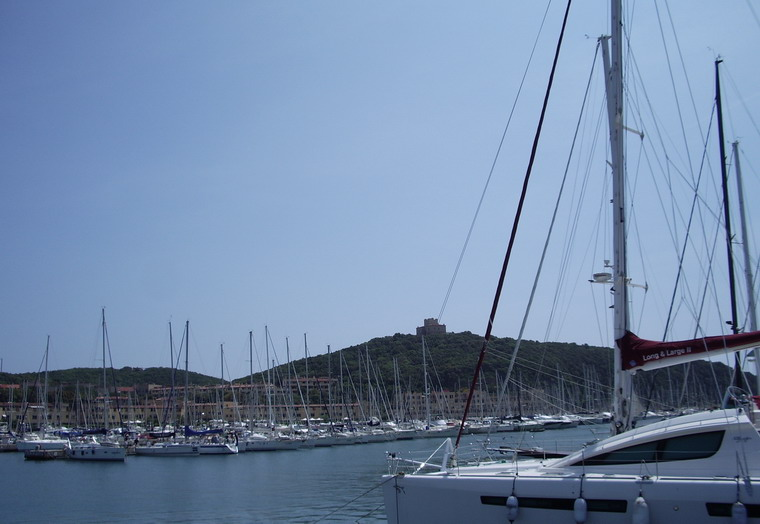
- Port of Punta Ala

- Location of Punta Ala in Italy
- Coordinates: 42.8019°N 10.7539°E
- Country: Italy
- Region: Tuscany
- Province: Grosseto (GR)
- Comune: Castiglione della Pescaia
- Elevation: 38 m (125 ft)

Population (2011)
  - Total: 402
- Demonym: Puntalese(i)
- Time zone: UTC+1 (CET)
  - Summer (DST): UTC+2 (CEST)
- Postal code: 58040
- Dialing code: (+39) 0564

Punta Ala (formerly Punta Troia) is a frazione of the town of Castiglione della Pescaia, in the province of Grosseto, Tuscany, Italy. The small town with a population of 402 people lies at the bottom of the northern hillsides of the promontory of the same name. The coastal town is a popular summer seaside destination.

== History ==
Previously known as Punta Troia (derived from the Latin Port Traiani), its named was changed to Punta Ala (from aviation jargon, Ala means wing in Italian) after the Italian aviator Italo Balbo, who had purchased some fortifications and villas in the area which later became his residences. Punta Ala literally translates to "point wing", describing the whole area as a wing of a plane with Punta Ala situated in the very tip of it.

The modern day tourist center developed during the course of the twentieth century, particularly in the 1960s withe the plan of the architect Walter Di Salvo. The village is known for its residential and commercial buildings with contemporary architecture, designed by architects such as Franco Albini, Franca Helg, Ignazio Gardella, Alfonso Stocchetti, and Ludovico Quaroni.

The town is famous for its sailing regattas which are held by the local Yacht Club Punta Ala and the well equipped tourist port, the home of Luna Rossa.

While Punta Ala becomes a popular family destination during the summer, the place is a tourist destination of the elite in every season, thanks to its luxury residences, second homes, boats moored at the local port and the polo club.

== Monuments ==
While presenting itself as a modern, functional and exclusive beach resort, Punta Ala was situated in a vital strategical position on the border between the Principality of Piombino in the north and the Grand Duchy of Tuscany to the south.

The fear of pirate invasions forced the construction of some fortifications to protect the coast.

The Hidalgo Tower, overlooking the modern town, was built during the sixteenth century to defend the far end of the southern principality of Piombino.

Il Castello di Punta Ala (Punta Ala castle), was also built in the sixteenth century by the Medici on the headland to the south-east of the site for the control of the north coast of Castiglione della Pescaia.

The Appiani Tower was built by its name sake to further enhance the defense system of the principality.

== Image gallery ==
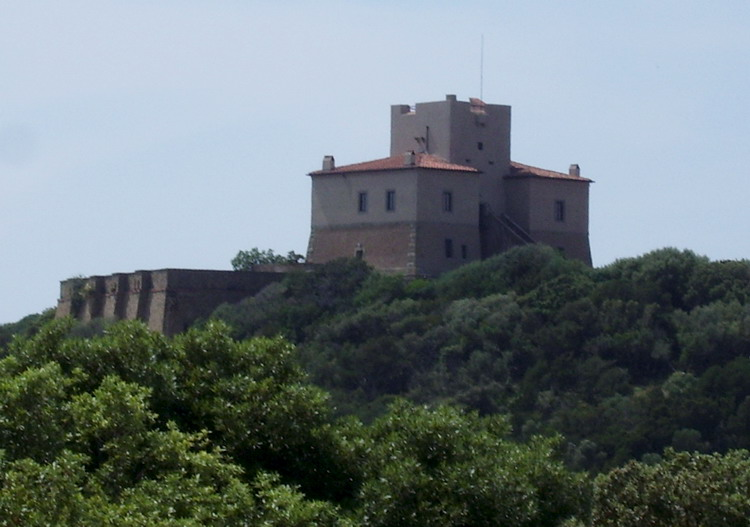
The castle

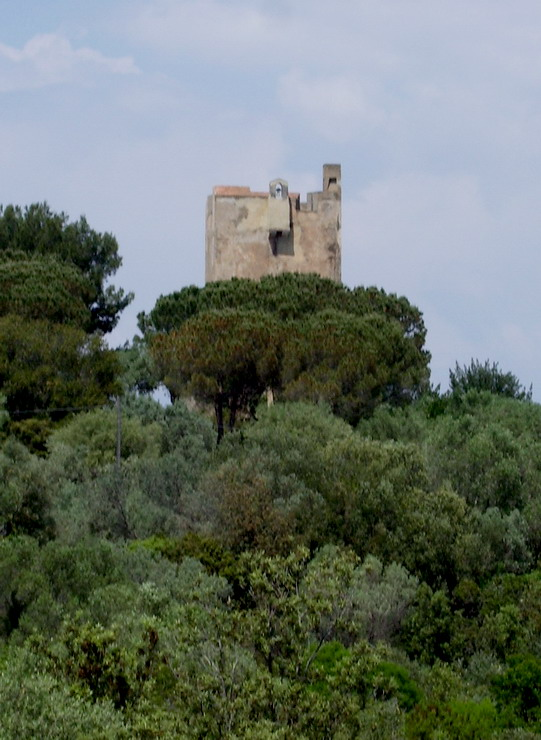
The Hidalgo Tower

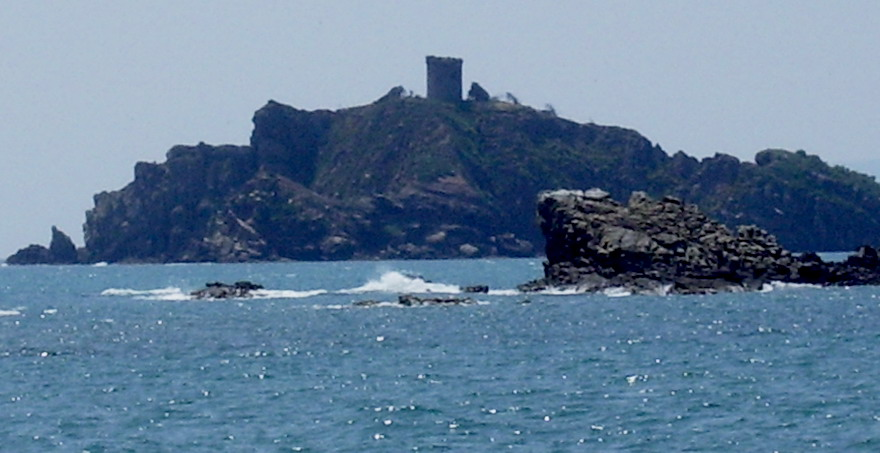
The Isolotto dello Sparviero (Sparviero Isle) with the Appiani Tower

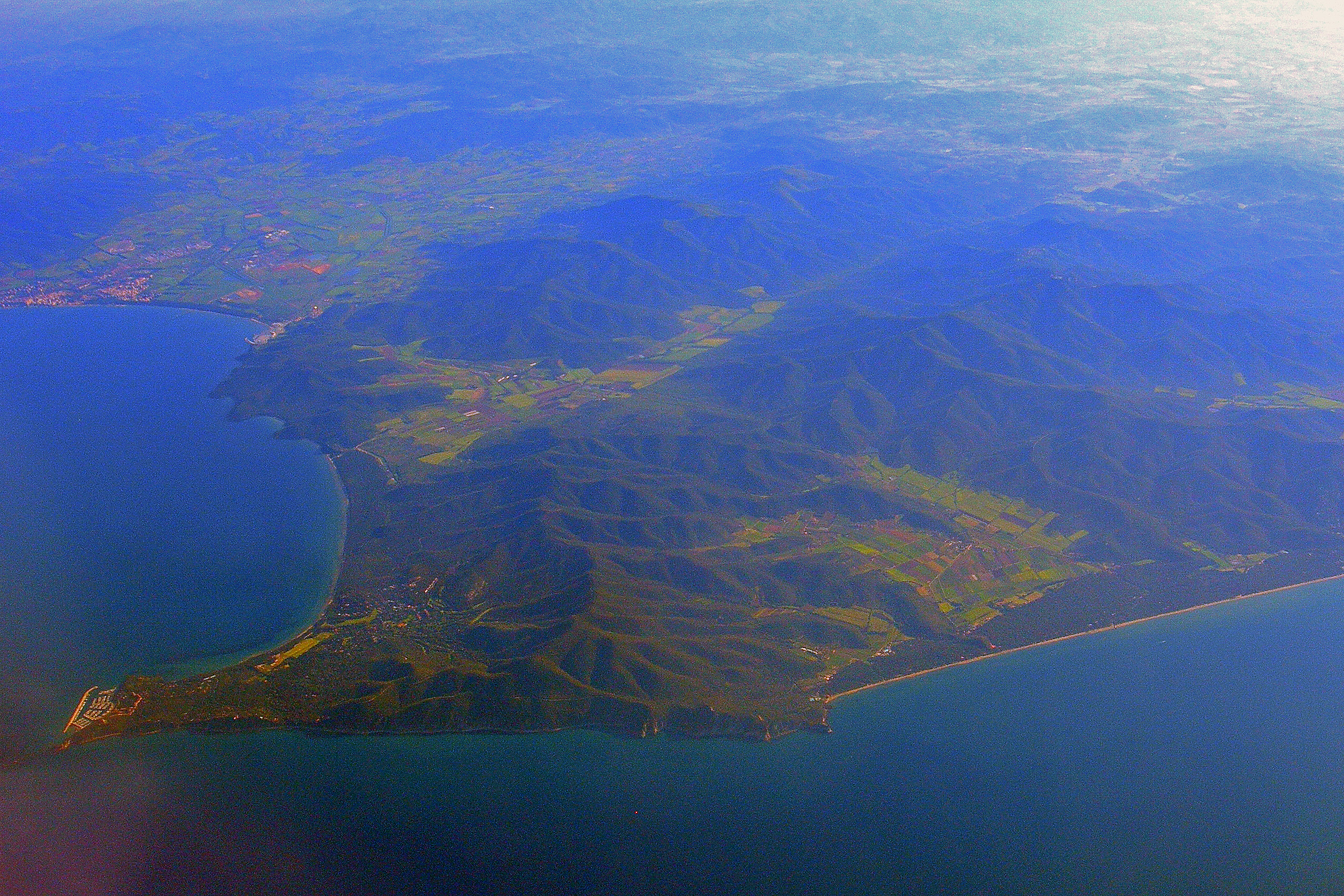
Aerial view of Punta Ala and the surrounding area

== See also ==
- Buriano, Castiglione della Pescaia
- Pian d'Alma
- Pian di Rocca
- Roccamare
- Rocchette
- Tirli
- Vetulonia
