= Castiglione della Pescaia =

- Comune
- Comune di Castiglione della Pescaia
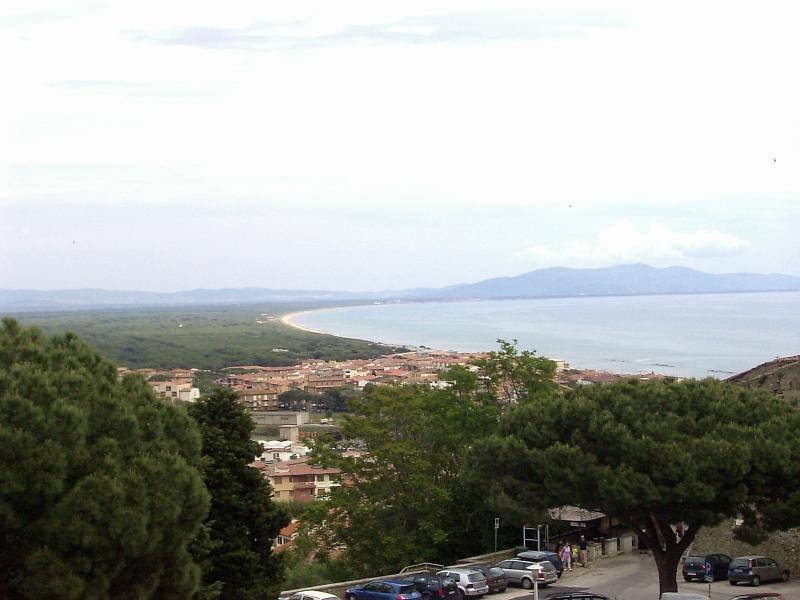

- Location within Italy Location within Tuscany
- Coordinates: 42°45′N 10°52′E
- Country: Italy
- Region: Tuscany
- Province: Grosseto (GR)
- Frazioni: Ampio, Buriano, Macchiascandona, Pian d'Alma, Pian di Rocca, Ponti di Badia, Punta Ala, Riva del Sole, Roccamare, Rocchette, Tirli, Vetulonia

Government
  - Mayor: Elena Nappi (centre-left)

Area
  - Total: 209.28 km^{2} (80.80 sq mi)
- Elevation: 4 m (13 ft)

Population (31 December 2017)
  - Total: 7,289
  - Density: 34.83/km^{2} (90.21/sq mi)
- Demonym: Castiglionesi
- Time zone: UTC+1 (CET)
  - Summer (DST): UTC+2 (CEST)
- Postal code: 58043
- Dialing code: 0564
- Patron saint: St. William of Aquitania
- Saint day: 2 May
- Website: Official website

Castiglione della Pescaia (Italian pronunciation: [kastiʎˈʎoːne della peˈskaːja]; abbreviated by locals as Castiglione or Castiglioni), is an ancient seaside town in the province of Grosseto, in Tuscany, central Italy. Situated in the Grossetan Maremma, the modern town grew around a medieval 12th century fortress (Italian: castello) and a large fishery, from which it acquired its designation. Today Castiglione is a very popular tourist destination with attractions that include beaches, natural parks, biking trails, historical Etruscan archaeological sites, a panoramic mediaeval hamlet as well as the Diaccia Botrona Nature Reserve, a swampy humid environment of historical relevance whose endangered wildlife comprise pink flamingoes, mallards and ducks.

Castiglione della Pescaia is home to the second most expensive street in Italy for property prices, with average values exceeding those of homes in every other Italian street except one, also in Tuscany.

== Geography ==
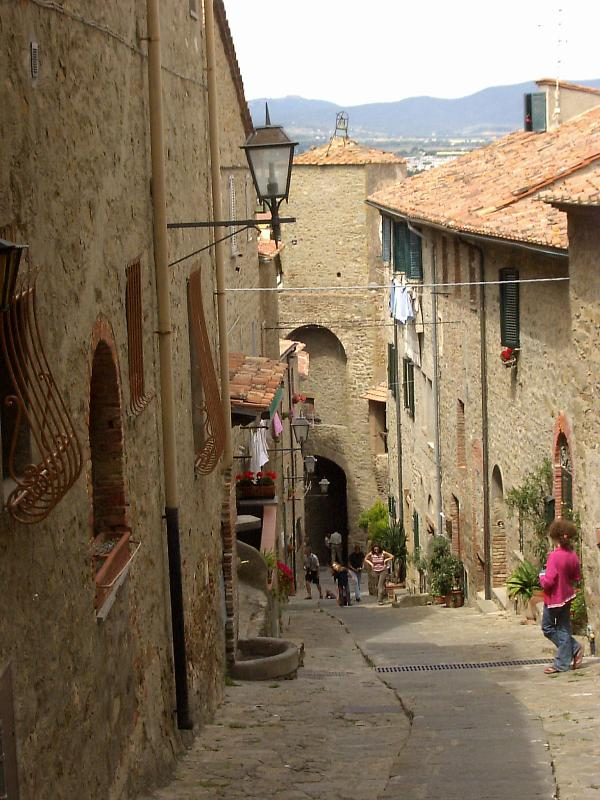
View in the hilltop fortress.

Castiglione della Pescaia consists of a High City built on the hill that ends a chain of hills towards the sea, and of a Low City at the foot of the former, straddling the drainage canal and marina that form the central part of town.

Castiglione is located in the South-Western portion of Tuscany, with a view of the islands of Elba and Giglio, and of the promontory of Argentario. The hills that back the city slope into beaches that front the town in its entirety. To the East of Castiglione is the rich floodplain of the Ombrone river. Nothing much remains of the ancient lake Prile that used to be Castiglione's lifeblood.

Despite Castiglione's popularity as a holiday destination, the town's natural surroundings - including the sea, marshes and pinewoods typical of the Maremma area - have been meticulously preserved and are today forming protected natural reserves. Notably, in 2015 Castiglione's sea was nominated as Italy's most beautiful by the national non-governmental environmentalist organisation Legambiente, which not only praised the town's seawater cleanliness but also its environmental efforts and efficient recycling.

Castiglione is the most visited seaside destination in Tuscany and it ranks second among the most visited cities in the region, being only preceded by Florence. In 2019, approximately 1.6 million tourists visited Castiglione reaching an historic record. The town is also one of the most visited in Italy.

== History ==
While Umbrians and Etruscans were most likely the first inhabitants of its location, Castiglione della Pescaia was first recorded under the name Salebrone in Roman times. The hill close to the coast proved to be an excellent location, as it dominated the sizable inland Prelius Lake, while the lake itself provided fish for food and salt, which could be traded.

In the Middle Ages, the city suffered repeated pirate attacks and almost disappeared. It resurfaced in the 9th century AD under its current name, under joint protection of the Papacy and the Republic of Pisa.

The Pisans used Castiglione as a key element in their system of defence along the Tyrrhenian coast. They built first a single tower on top of the hill, later expanded that to three towers joined by a wall that became the nucleus of the citadel. The three towers of Castiglione dominate the city seal to this day.

In the 13th century, Castiglione became an independent comune. Meanwhile, the river Ombrone had started silting up Lake Prile, which soon became a lagoon. In this newly formed lagoon, malaria mosquitoes took hold, weakening the population of Castiglione. The city requested protection from various powers (Siena, the Medici, Aragon) and finally became part of the Grand Duchy of Tuscany under the House of Habsburg-Lorraine.

The House of Lorraine started a series of projects that greatly enhanced the lives of Castiglionesi. The swamps were drained over decades, increasing the amount of arable land, as well as killing off the malaria-carrying mosquitoes.

After Tuscany became part of Italy in 1859, Castiglione became a comune in the province of Grosseto.

== Government ==
=== Frazioni ===
The municipality is formed by the municipal seat of Castiglione della Pescaia and the villages (frazioni) and hamlets of Buriano, Macchiascandona, Pian d'Alma, Pian di Rocca, Punta Ala, Roccamare, Rocchette, Tirli and Vetulonia.

=== List of mayors ===
Mayor	Term start	Term end	Party
Carlo Mini	1946	1953	
Otello Carraresi	1953	1961	
Walter Vannucci	1961	1964	
Fedro Mirolli	1964	1977	
Giancarlo Farnetani	1978	1990	Italian Communist Party
Dario Viti	1990	1992	Italian Communist Party/Democratic Party of the Left
Massimo Emiliani	1993	1996	Italian Radicals
Franco Roggiolani	1996	2001	Democratic Party of the Left/Democrats of the Left
Monica Faenzi	2001	2011	Forza Italia/The People of Freedom
Giancarlo Farnetani	2011	2021	Democratic Party
Elena Nappi	2021	incumbent	centre-left civic list "Castiglione Futura"

== Main sights ==
One of the most popular tourist destinations in the area is the historical Etruscan centre of Vetulonia, which hosts an Etruscan museum with an adjacent well preserved archaeological site, encompassing ancient remains of the old inhabitants of Maremma. Furthermore, the hamlets of Punta Ala, Riva del Sole, Roccamare and Rocchette are beach resorts catering mostly tourists from Central and Northern Europe.

In the territory of Castiglione della Pescaia, the Diaccia Botrona Nature Reserve (with 18th-century Casa Rossa Ximenes) is a designated wetland area of international interest, according to the Ramsar Convention.

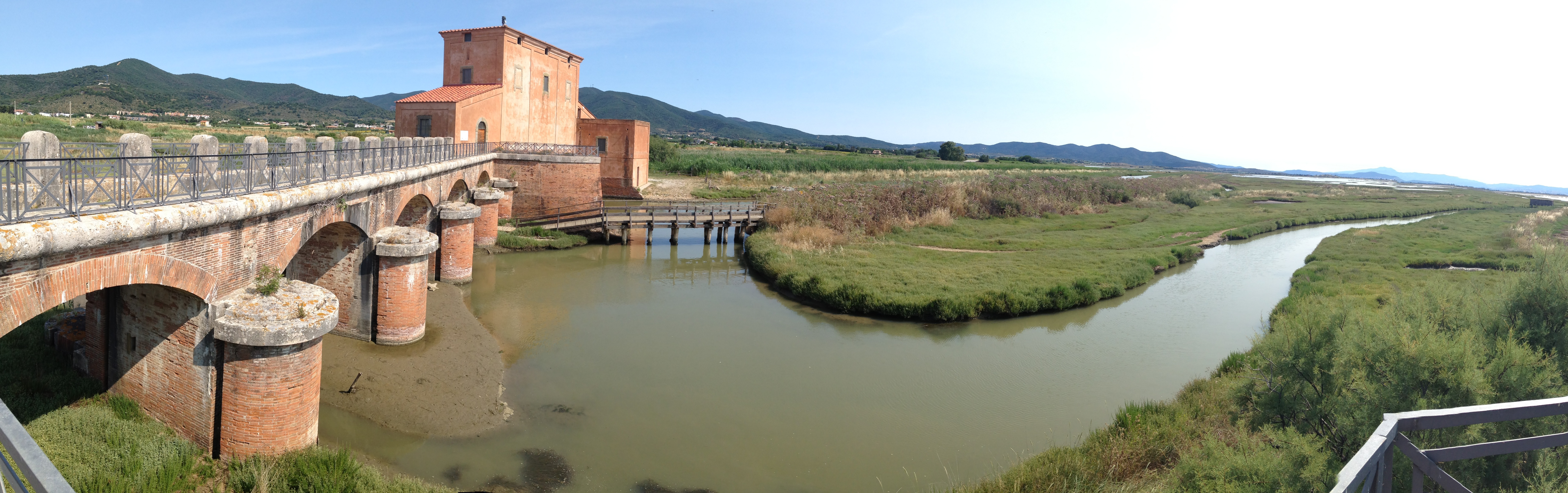
Panoramic view of Casa Rossa Ximenes.
