= Iacopo =

Iacopo is a given name, form of Jacopo, an Italian variation of Giacomo. May also refer to:

- Iacopo II Appiani (1400–1441), the lord of Piombino from 1405 until 1441
- Iacopo III Appiani (1422–1474), Prince of Piombino of the Appiani dynasty in the Renaissance
- Iacopo IV Appiani (1459–1510), Italian condottiero and lord of Piombino of the Appiani dynasty in the Renaissance
- Iacopo V Appiani (1480–1545), the lord of Piombino of the Appiani dynasty from 1511 until his death
- Iacopo Balestri (born 1975), Italian footballer
- Iacopo Barsotti (1921–1987), Italian mathematician
- Iacopo Jacomelli (born 1921), Italian singer of 1940s
- Iacopo La Rocca (born 1984), Italian football defender
- Iacopo Rusticucci, 13th century Florentine politician
- Vitaliano di Iacopo Vitaliani, Paduan nobleman who lived in the late 13th century around the time of Giotto and Dante
