= Appiani family =

Italian noble family

Appiani
- Country: Republic of Pisa; Lordship of Piombino; Principality of Piombino
- Founded: 13th century
- Founder: Benvenuto da Appiano
- Final ruler: Isabella Appiani
- Titles: Lord of Pisa; Lord of Piombino; Prince of Piombino; Marquis of Populonia; Lord of Populonia; Lord of Buriano; Lord of Scarlino; Lord of Suvereto; Lord of Riotorto; Lord of Elba; Lord of Pianosa; Lord of Montecristo
- Dissolution: 1661

The Appiani family (also Appiano or d'Appiano) was an Italian noble family, originally from Al Piano or Appiano, a now disappeared toponym identified with the modern La Pieve in the comune of Ponsacco, Tuscany. They held the principality of Piombino from the early 15th century until 1628.

== History ==
The family originated in the region of Appiano val d'Era, in the present-day province of Pisa. The first known member is one Guarnito d'Appiano, a notary who lived between 1200 and 1255; his son Jacopo (flourished at Pisa c. 1230-1290) was also a notary, as well as his grandson Benvenuto, who became chief of the Pisane Corporation of Notaries. His grand-grandson Vanni, also a notary, became an Anziano ("Elder", meaning consul) of Pisa and then Chancellor of the Senate of Lucca in 1347, before he was beheaded at Pisa in May 1355. His son Jacopo (c. 1322 - 1398) became Chancellor of the Republic of Pisa and head of the political party of the Raspanti, associated with the Della Gherardesca family. In 1392, after assassinating Pietro Gambacorti and his sons, he became the effective lord of Pisa.

He was succeeded by his son Gherardo (c. 1370-1405) in 1398, who, one year later, ceded the seigniory of Pisa to Gian Galeazzo Visconti, lord of Milan; when the latter died, Pisa was sold to Florence by Gabriele Maria Visconti, while the Appiani retained the lordship of Piombino, Suvereto, Buriano, Scarlino, Vignale, Populonia, Elba, Pianosa and Montecristo. Gherardo was succeeded by his son Iacopo II in 1404; at his death (1441), his mother and regent Paola Colonna clashed against Emanuele Appiani for Piombino. Paola Colonna died in 1445, and the rule went to Caterina, Iacopo II's sister, although the effective rule was held by her husband Rinaldo Orsini. Rinaldo died of plague in 1450, and Caterina in 1451, after which Emanuele was elected lord of Piombino by the population.

Iacopo V married three nieces of the Medici pope Leo X: Emilia Ridolfi, her younger sister Clarice (daughters of Contessina de' Medici) and finally Elena Salviati (daughter of Lucrezia de' Medici), but had issue only by Elena. However, his son Iacopo VI was ousted from Piombino in 1548 by emperor Charles V, who assigned his lands to Cosimo I, Duke of Tuscany. Iacopo was restored in 1559, though three years later a popular revolt forced him to fight in the Tuscan navy, leaving his son Alessandro as governor. Alessandro was able to obtain the imperial legitimation, but was killed by the populace in 1589 after four years of reign. Iacopo VII succeeded him, obtaining from emperor Rudolf II the title of prince. After Iacopo died heirless in 1603, Piombino went to a cousin, but the principality was actually held by Isabella Appiani until 1628, when she was ousted; finally, in 1634 emperor Ferdinand II assigned Piombino to Niccolò Ludovisi, who married a daughter of Isabella.

== See also ==
- Monumental Cemetery of Staglieno#Cultural references
