= Emanuele Appiani =

Emanuele Appiani (c. 1380 – 15 February 1457) was Prince of Piombino during the Appiani dynasty in the Renaissance.

He was born in Pisa, the son of Iacopo I Appiani, and followed his brother Gherardo to Piombino when he became lord of the Tuscan city. When Gherardo died, he remained in the court but the lordship was inherited by his son Iacopo II, under the tutorage of his mother Paola Colonna.

When Iacopo II died, despite Emanuele being the last living Appiani male, she kept the seigniory, thanks to the support of her son-in-law, the condottiero Rinaldo Orsini. When Paola died, the latter inherited the title under his daughter Caterina Appiani. In reply, Emanuele married in 1445 Colia de' Giudici, illegitimate daughter of King Alfonso V of Naples, who marched to Piombino with an army. Orsini died of plague, followed soon afterwards by Caterina, and Emanuele could enter Piombino in 1452 after being elected lord by the city's Elders.

He died at Piombino in 1457, being succeeded by his son Iacopo.

Preceded by Caterina Appiani	Prince of Piombino; 1451–1457	Succeeded by Iacopo III Appiani
