= Isabella Appiani =

- Princess of Piombino
- Born: 1577
- Died: 10 November 1661 (aged 83–84); Rome, Italy
- Noble family: Appiani
- Spouses: Giorgio de Mendoza; Paolo Giordano II Orsini
- Issue: Barbara de Mendoza-Appiani; Polissena de Mendoza-Appiani
- Father: Alessandro Appiani
- Mother: Isabella de Mendoza

Isabella Appiani (1577 – 10 November 1661) was Princess of Piombino from 1611 until 1628. Through her father, she was a descendant of Lorenzo de' Medici.

== Life ==
She was the daughter of Alessandro Appiani and his wife, Isabella de Mendoza. In 1589 her father died; he was succeeded by her brother Jacob VII. As the boy was in his minority, their mother acted as regent. In 1603, Jacob died childless, prompting fears of Spanish rule. Rudolf II, Holy Roman Emperor succeeded the same year; he ruled until 1611, until an invasion by the Appiani family which deposed Rudolf and replaced him with Isabella, Jacob's closest surviving relative.

Isabella was the first Princess of Piombino, but the third female ruler after Paola Colonna and Caterina Appiani, both of whom were titled Lady of Piombino. Her full title was: Isabella, Princess of Piombino, Marchioness of Populonia, Lady of Scarlino, Populonia, Vignale, Abbadia del Fango, Suvereto, Buriano and the Islands of Elba, Montecristo, Pianosa, Cerboli and Palmaionla.

Isabella firstly married Giorgio de Mendoza at Genoa; they had two daughters, Barbara, who died before her mother, and Polissena (d.1642), who married Niccolò Ludovisi. Giorgio died in 1618. Isabella was married secondly in Rome in 1622 to Paolo Giordano II Orsini, son of Virginio Orsini, Duke of Bracciano. Following their marriage, Paolo commissioned Simon Vouet to paint a portrait of Isabella.

In 1628, the Spanish invaded again and managed to conquer the principality; as a result, Isabella and Paolo were forced to flee Piombino. In 1634, the principality was assigned to Isabella's son-in-law Niccolò.

In 1633, Isabella became a grandmother when her daughter Polissena gave birth to a son, Gregorio Filippo.

Isabella died in Rome on 10 November 1661, aged 83 or 84, having outlived her daughters and grandson.

Regnal titles
Preceded by Rudolf	Princess of Piombino; 1611–1628	Succeeded by Philip
