= Semiramide Appiano =

Italian noblewoman (1464–1523)

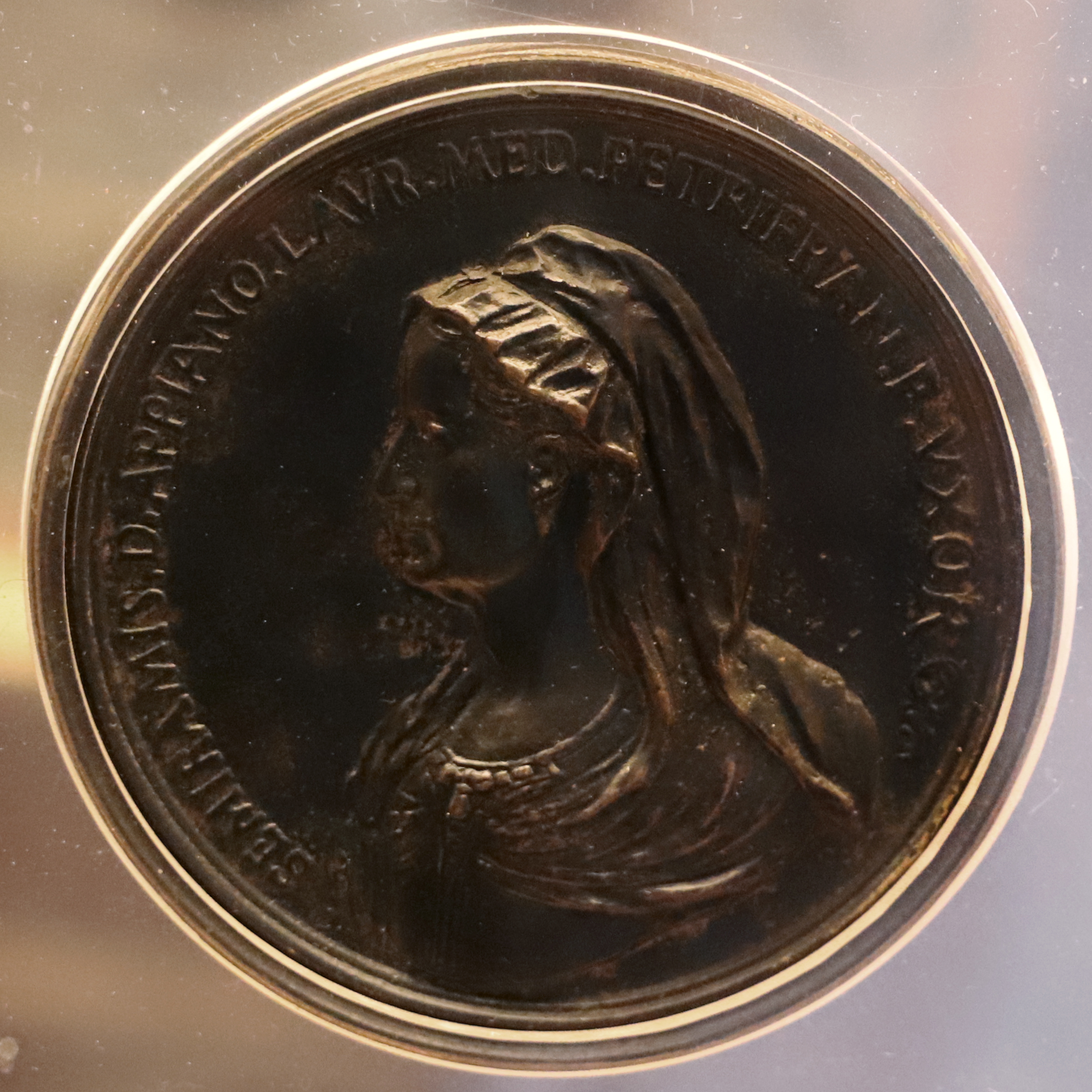
- Antonio Selvi's incision of Semiramide, 1739

- Coat of arms
- Born: Semiramide di Appiano di Aragona; 1464; Republic of Florence
- Died: 9 March 1523 (aged 58–59); Republic of Florence
- Noble family: Appiano-Aragona (birth); Medici (marriage)
- Spouse: Lorenzo di Pierfrancesco de' Medici (m. 1482; died 1503)
- Issue: Pierfrancesco de' Medici; Averardo de' Medici; Laudomia de' Medici; Ginevra de' Medici; Vincenzo de' Medici
- Father: Jacopo III Appiano, Prince of Piombino
- Mother: Battistina Fregoso

Semiramide Appiano of Aragon (1464 – 9 March 1523) was an Italian noblewoman, daughter of the Lord of Piombino Jacopo III Appiano and wife of Lorenzo di Pierfrancesco de' Medici. She was the niece of the famous Simonetta Vespucci, Botticelli's muse.

== Biography ==
Semiramide Appiani was born in Florence in 1464. She was the daughter of Jacopo III Appiano, Lord of Piombino and relative of the Aragonas of Naples (his mother was Colia de' Giudici, natural daughter of Alfonso V of Aragon), and of Battistina Fregoso, daughter of Genoa doge Battista Fregoso, sister of doge Pietro Fregoso and maternal half-sister of the famous Simonetta Vespucci, known for her beauty and alleged lover of Giuliano de' Medici.

In 1478 Lorenzo de' Medici, Giuliano's older brother and Lord of Florence, arranged a betrothal between Giuliano and Semiramide, but the marriage was never held due to Giuliano's death on 26 April 1478 during the Pazzi conspiracy. As a result, in 1482, Semiramide was given instead in marriage to Lorenzo di Pierfrancesco de' Medici, a cousin of Lorenzo and his protégé. Five children were born from the marriage.

Semiramide died in Florence on 9 March 1523 at age fifty-eight.

== Issue ==
By her husband, Semiramide had three sons and two daughters:

- Pierfrancesco de' Medici (1487-1525), known as Pierfrancesco II the Younger. He married Maria Soderini and had two sons and two daughters.
- Averardo de' Medici (1488-1494). Died in infancy.
- Laudomia de' Medici. In 1502 she married Francesco Salviati.
- Ginevra de' Medici. She married Giovanni degli Albizzi and had four sons: Luca (1511-1555, married Laudomia Pitti), Lorenzo (1512-1560), Benedetto (1514-1546, poet) and Francesco (1516-1588, valet of Pope Paul III and canon of the Florence Cathedral from 1541).
- Vincenzo de' Medici.
