= Iacopo III Appiani =

Lord of Piombino (1439-1474)

Iacopo III Appiano
- VI Lord of Piombino
- Variant of the Appiano coat of arms used by Iacopo III his successors as descendants of Alfonso V of Aragon
- Reign: 1458 - 10 March 1474
- Predecessor: Emanuele Appiano
- Successor: Iacopo IV Appiano
- Full name: Iacopo III di Emanuele Appiano
- Other titles: Lord of Scarlino; Lord of Populonia; Lord of Suvereto; Lord of Buriano; Lord of Badia al Fango; Lord of Elba; Lord of Montecristo; Lord of Pianosa; Count palatine
- Born: 1439; Piombino
- Died: 10 March 1474 (aged 34–35); Piombino
- Noble family: Appiano
- Spouse: Battistina Fregoso (m. 1454; died 1473)
- Issue: Emanuele Appiano; Iacopo IV Appiano; Belisario Appiano; Gherardo Appiano; Semiramide Appiano; Belisario Appiano
- Father: Emanuele Appiano
- Mother: Colia de' Giudici

Iacopo III Appiano, VI Lord of Piombino (1439 - 10 March 1474) was an Italian nobleman.

== Biography ==
Iacopo Appiano was born in 1439 in Piombino, son of Emanuele Appiano, Lord of Piombino, and Colia de' Giudici, natural daughter of Alfonso V of Aragon, King of Naples.

He became Lord of Piombino and Lord of the others family feuds in 1458, on the death of his father.

Despite the economic difficulties, he tried to show himself as a patron of the arts, in particular, he hired the architect and sculptor Andrea Guardi, to whom he commissioned many works between 1465 and 1470: the construction of the Citadel to replace Appiano Palace, the Appiano chapel, a series of hydraulic works and the cloister with baptismal font of Sant'Antimo.

Of poor health, in 1463 he fell ill with quartan fever, recovering from it (also thanks to the sending from Siena of renowned doctors such as Bartolo di Tura Bandini) but without ever fully recovering.

Iacopo III Appiano died on 10 March 1474, in Piombino, due to the consequences of malaria. A few months earlier, the same disease had killed his wife.

== Issue ==
In 1454 Jacopo III Appiano married Battistina Fregoso (1432- 18 December 1473), daughter of the doge of the Republic of Genoa Battista Fregoso, sister of the doge Pietro Fregoso and maternal half-sister of Simonetta Cattaneo Vespucci.

They had five sons and one daughter:

- Emanuele Appiano. Died in infancy.
- Iacopo IV Appiano (1459-1510). VII Lord of Piombino and Prince of the Holy Roman Empire.
- Belisario Appiano. Died in infancy.
- Gherardo Appiano (1461-1502). Feudal lord.
- Semiramide Appiano (1464-1523). Betrothed to Giuliano de' Medici (1453-1478), brother of the Lord of Florence Lorenzo the Magnificent. Giuliano died before the wedding, so she married his cousin, Lorenzo di Pierfrancesco de' Medici, instead. She had three sons and two daughters.
- Belisario Appiano (1465-1515). Feudal lord. He married Aurelia Sforza di Santa Fiora and gave birth to the branch Appiano of Populonia.

Preceded by Emanuele Appiani	Prince of Piombino; 1457–1474	Succeeded by Iacopo IV Appiani
