= Lorenzo di Pierfrancesco de' Medici =

Italian banker and politician

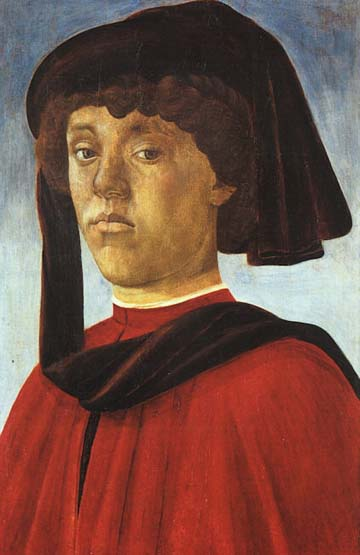
- Possible portrait of Lorenzo, by Sandro Botticelli
- Born: 4 August 1463; Florence, Republic of Florence
- Died: 20 May 1503 (aged 39); Florence, Republic of Florence
- Noble family: Medici
- Spouse: Semiramide Appiano (m. 1482)
- Issue: Pierfrancesco the Younger; Averardo de' Medici; Laudomia de' Medici; Ginevra de' Medici; Vincenzo de' Medici
- Father: Pierfrancesco the Elder
- Mother: Laudomia Acciaioli

Lorenzo di Pierfrancesco de' Medici (4 August 1463 – 20 May 1503), nicknamed the Popolano, was an Italian banker and politician, the brother of Giovanni il Popolano. He belonged to the junior (or "Popolani") branch of the House of Medici of Florence.

== Biography ==
Lorenzo was born in Florence, the son of Pierfrancesco de' Medici (the Elder) and Laudomia Acciaioli. Relations between the senior Medici branch and the younger "Popolani" branch had been tense since the 1440s, and Pierfrancesco had tried to shield his sons from the influence of the senior branch. But Lorenzo and Giovanni were still boys when their father Pierfrancesco died in 1476, and they promptly came under the tutelage of their older cousin, Lorenzo (il Magnifico), the effective ruler of Florence. Facing financial difficulties after 1478, Lorenzo il Magnifico plundered the Popolani boys' inheritance with "forced loans". By the time they came of age, they claimed Lorenzo il Magnifico owed them over 100,000 ducats (il Magnifico eventually repaid a little over half of that in 1485).

Nonetheless, Lorenzo il Magnifico ensured his ward obtained the best education that could be bought at the time. Lorenzo di Pierfrancesco studied under notable Florentine Renaissance humanists Marsilio Ficino, Angelo Poliziano and Giorgio Antonio Vespucci (uncle of the navigator Amerigo Vespucci; Amerigo was a fellow-student and, from the 1483, became an employee and friend of Lorenzo di Pierfrancesco; in the early 1500s, Amerigo Vespucci would send most of his famous letters on the "New World" to Lorenzo di Pierfrancesco). Lorenzo di Pierfrancesco emerged with the reputation as a man of liberal views, a poet and art connoisseur in his own right. In ca. 1485, he commissioned an illuminated manuscript of Dante's Divine Comedy featuring artwork by Botticelli.

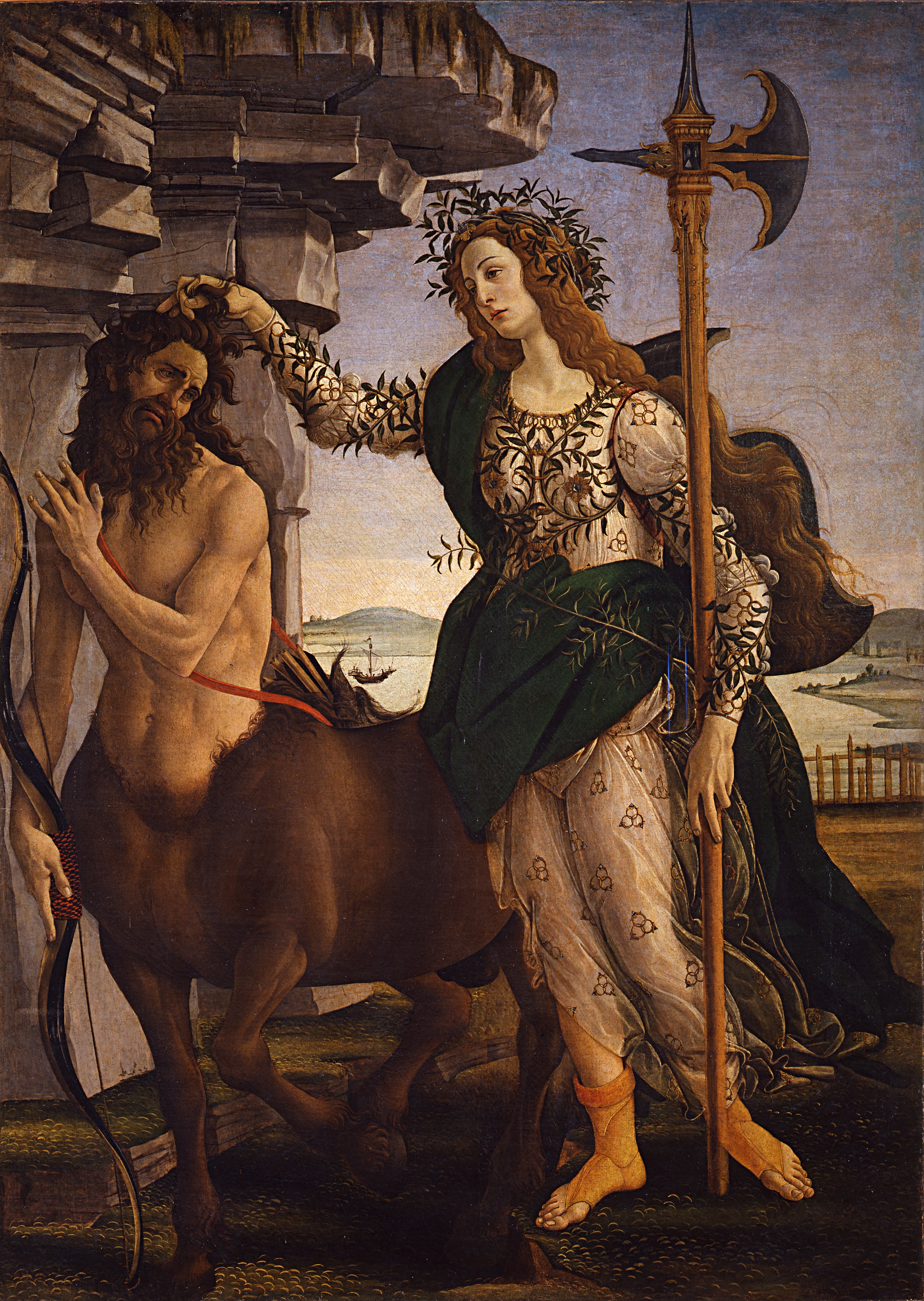
Pallas Athene Taming a Centaur.

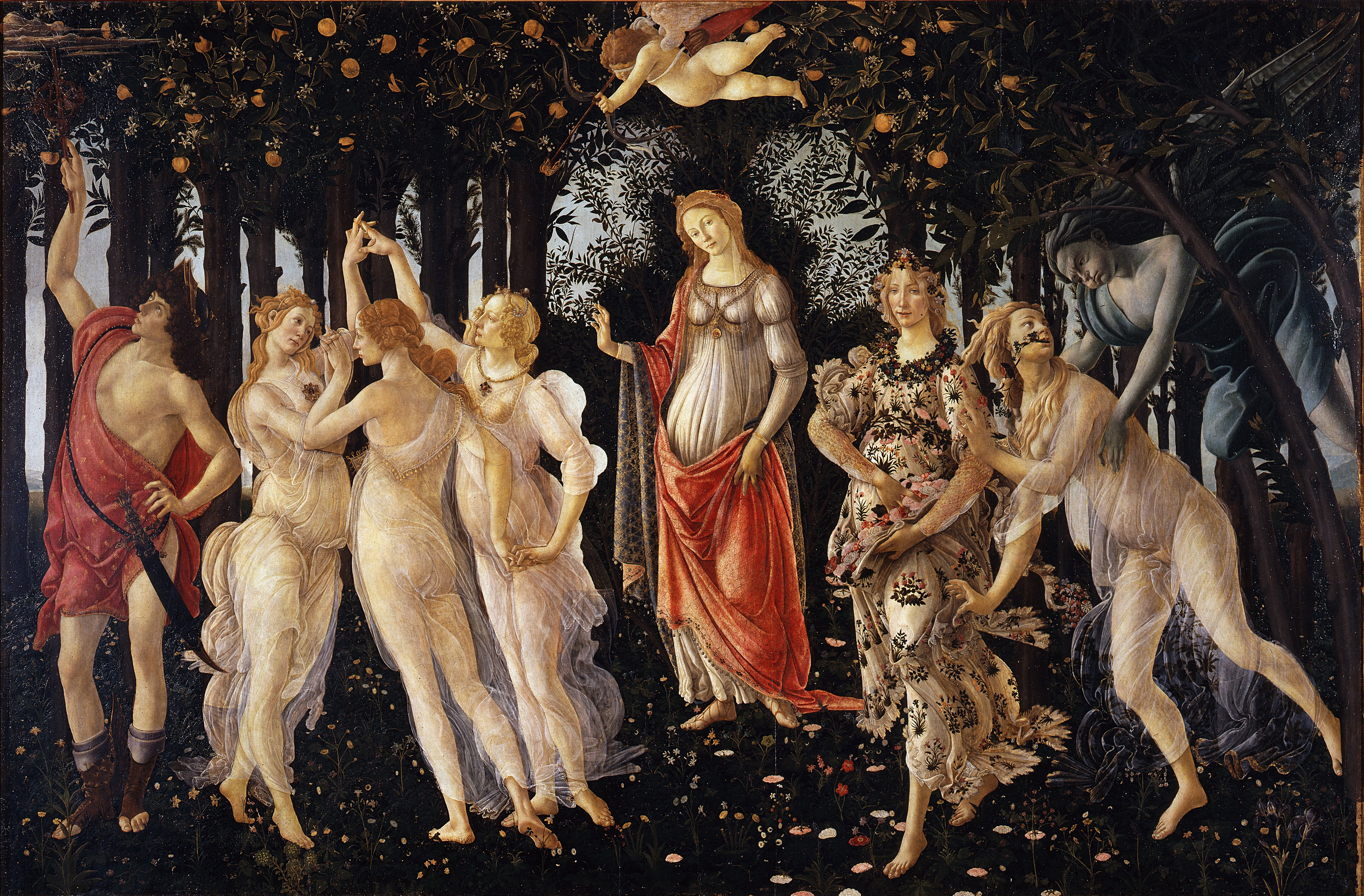
Allegory of Spring.

The Birth of Venus.

In 1482, Lorenzo il Magnifico arranged for the marriage between the young Lorenzo di Pierfrancesco and Semiramide d'Appiani, daughter of the Appiani lord Jacopo III of Piombino, who brought not only lucrative commercial ties but also political connections (the Appiani were related by marriage to the Aragonese of Naples). Lorenzo il Magnifico may have commissioned Sandro Botticelli's Pallas Athene Taming a Centaur as a wedding gift to the new couple, presumably suggesting that Semiramide (represented by Pallas) should endeavour to "tame" young Lorenzo di Pierfrancesco (represented by centaur) (or more metaphorically, the surrender of brute instincts to the goddess of reason, a reference to Lorenzo di Pierfrancesco's entrance to manhood). It is believed that also on this occasion, either Lorenzo il Magnifico or Lorenzo di Pierfrancesco himself, commissioned Botticelli's Allegory of Spring to celebrate the wedding - with Mercury representing Lorenzo di Pierfrancesco and Semiramide represented by the central Grace (or possibly Flora). Lorenzo di Pierfrancesco is believed to have later commissioned Botticelli's The Birth of Venus, one of the most famous paintings of the Renaissance.

Lorenzo di Pierfranceso was the proprietor of the Villa del Trebbio, inherited from his grandfather Lorenzo the Elder, and Villa di Castello, acquired in 1477 on the instructions of Lorenzo il Magnifico. In 1483, he was dispatched as the Florentine ambassador to Paris, to witness the coronation of Charles VIII of France.

Quarrels over the inheritance lingered. The rupture with Lorenzo il Magnifico came to a head in October 1484, when the strongman secured the erasure of Lorenzo di Pierfrancesco's name from the lists of persons eligible for election to the Florentine political institutions. As part of the settlement in 1485, which involved outside arbitration, Lorenzo di Pierfrancesco and his brother Giovanni il Popolano received the Medici family property of Villa Cafaggiolo in the Mugello region. Nonetheless, it was clear that Lorenzo di Pierfrancesco would have to shelve any public office or political ambitions during il Magnifico's rule.

When Lorenzo il Magnifico died (1492), Lorenzo and Giovanni sided against the il Magnifico's son, Piero (il Fatuo). Two years later they were exiled, but returned when King Charles VIII of France invaded Italy and Piero was ousted from Florence by a Republican government. The two brothers sided with the Republican party, and received the nickname Popolano ("of the people"). Lorenzo di Pierfrancesco became one of the most outstanding figures of the new administration, and was regarded by many as the cultural heir of il Magnifico. He protected Botticelli, Michelangelo, Filippino Lippi, Bartolomeo Scala, and in 1494 he founded a workshop of ceramics at Cafaggiolo.

He was overshadowed by Savonarola, but after the latter's death it was rumoured he would receive the effective personal rule of the Republic; however, he refused. In 1501, Lorenzo di Pierfrancesco was suspected of a plot with Cesare Borgia to favour the latter in the conquest of the city, but the accusations were never confirmed. He died in Florence in 1503.

His grandson Lorenzino de' Medici was the assassin of Alessandro de' Medici, the last ruler of Florence from the "senior" branch of the Medici, thereby passing power to Lorenzo's great-grandson Cosimo I de' Medici.
