= Portrait of a Young Man with a Helmet =

Painting by Rosso Fiorentino

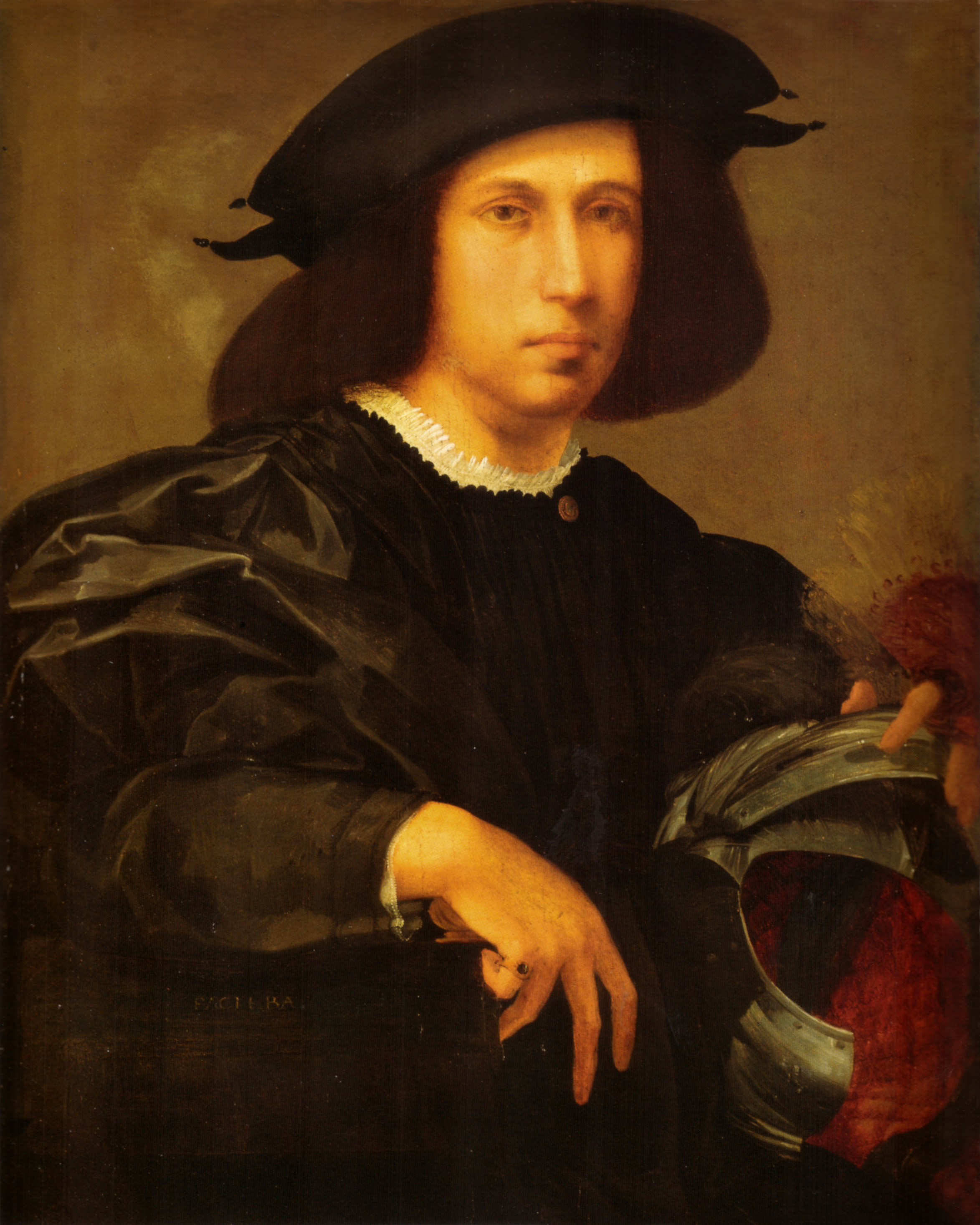
Portrait of a Young Man with a Helmet (c. 1520) by Rosso Fiorentino

Portrait of a Young Man with a Helmet is a c.1520 oil on panel painting by Rosso Fiorentino, now in the Walker Art Gallery in Liverpool. It is signed "Rubeus faciebat" on the edge of the armrest. Its subject is unknown, but may be the count of Anguillara, in whose home Rosso probably stayed in summer 1524.

The figure's pose and the characterisation of the subject are similar to the artist's Portrait of a Young Man. Its long-haired subject is shown half-length in a black robe, seated against a uniform brown background. The iconography of a helmet may suggest a soldier in civilian dress painted during the 1520s, whilst the artist was in Florence, judging by the lack of his original signature "Florentinus", seen on other works, seemingly produced during his travels
