= Jacopo =

Jacopo (also Iacopo) is a masculine Italian given name, derivant from Latin Iacōbus, itself from Greek Ἰάκωβος. It is an Italian variant of Giacomo (James in English).

- Jacopo Aconcio (c. 1520 – c. 1566), Italian religious reformer
- Jacopo d'Angelo (c. 1360–1411), Italian classical scholar and translator of Greek texts
- Jacopo Bassano (c. 1510 – 1592), Italian painter
- Jacopo da Bologna (fl. 1340–1360), Italian composer
- Jacopo Camagni (1977–2026), Italian illustrator and comic artist
- Jacopo Carucci (1494–1557), Italian painter otherwise known as Pontormo
- Jacopo Corsi (1561–1602), Italian composer
- Francesco II Gattilusio, born Jacopo Gattilusio, (c. 1365 – 26 October 1403/1404), lord of the Greek island of Lesbos, descendant of the Byzantine Greek Palaiologos dynasty
  - His son, Jacopo Gattilusio, (died 1428)
- Jacopo Guarnieri (born 1987), Italian cyclist
- Jacopo da Leona (died 1277), Italian poet
- Jacopo Luchini (born 1990), Italian para-snowboarder
- Jacopo Palaiologos Notaras (c. 1439 – c. 1491), Byzantine Greek aristocrat and brother of Anna Palaiologina Notara
- Jacopo Peri (1561–1633), Italian composer
- Jacopo Podocataro (fl. 1503–1507), Greek nobleman and viscount of Nicosia
- Jacopo Pio Porporino (born 2002), know professionally as Jacopo Sol, Italian singer-songwriter
- Jacopo della Quercia (c. 1374 – 1438), Italian sculptor
- Jacopo Riccati (1676–1754), Italian mathematician
- Jacopo Robusti (1518–1594), Italian painter otherwise known as Tintoretto
- Jacopo Sadoleto (1477–1547), Italian Catholic cardinal
- Jacopo Sannazaro (1458–1530), Italian poet, author of Arcadia

Fictional characters:

- Jacopo, a key character in the 2002 film version of The Count of Monte Cristo (and a minor character in the book).
- Jacopo Barberis, one of the main characters in Italian television series The Law According to Lidia Poët
- Jacopo Bearzatti, one of the central characters of The House in Fata Morgana and the protagonist of the prequel The House in Fata Morgana: A Requiem for Innocence
- Jacopo Belbo, one of the main characters of Foucault's Pendulum by Umberto Eco
- Jacopo Peterman, a character portrayed by John O'Hurley in the sitcom Seinfeld

== See also ==
- Iacopo
- Jack (given name)
