= San Lorenzo, Suvereto =

San Lorenzo
- Frazione
- Location of San Lorenzo in Italy
- Coordinates: 43°2′33″N 10°42′33″E
- Country: Italy
- Region: Tuscany
- Province: Livorno (LI)
- Comune: Suvereto
- Elevation: 32 m (105 ft)

Population (2011)
  - Total: 72
- Time zone: UTC+1 (CET)
  - Summer (DST): UTC+2 (CEST)
- Postal code: 57028
- Dialing code: (+39) 0565

San Lorenzo is a village in Tuscany, central Italy, administratively a frazione of the comune of Suvereto, province of Livorno. At the time of the 2011 census its population was 72.

San Lorenzo is about 80 km from Livorno and 5 km from Suvereto.

== Bibliography ==
- Emanuele Repetti (1835). "Castel San Lorenzo". Dizionario Geografico Fisico Storico della Toscana. Florence.
