= Belvedere, Suvereto =

Belvedere
- Frazione
- Location of Belvedere in Italy
- Coordinates: 43°5′19″N 10°40′28″E
- Country: Italy
- Region: Tuscany
- Province: Livorno (LI)
- Comune: Suvereto
- Elevation: 281 m (922 ft)

Population (2001)
  - Total: 12
- Time zone: UTC+1 (CET)
  - Summer (DST): UTC+2 (CEST)
- Postal code: 57028
- Dialing code: (+39) 0565

Belvedere is a village in Tuscany, central Italy, administratively a frazione of the comune of Suvereto, province of Livorno. At the time of the 2001 census its population was 12.

Belvedere is about 75 km (47 mi) from Livorno and 2 km (1.2 mi) from Suvereto.

== Bibliography ==
- Emanuele Repetti (1833). "Belvedere". Dizionario Geografico Fisico Storico della Toscana. Florence.
