= Vipera aspis hugyi =

Scientific classification
- Kingdom: Animalia
- Phylum: Chordata
- Class: Reptilia
- Order: Squamata
- Suborder: Serpentes
- Family: Viperidae
- Genus: Vipera
- Species: V. aspis
- Subspecies: V. a. hugyi

Trinomial name
- Vipera aspis hugyi Schinz, 1833

Synonyms
- Vipera Hugyi Schinz, 1833; Vipera Hugyii Schinz, 1833; Vipera Heegeri Schreiber, 1875; V[ipera]. Hugii F. Müller, 1880; Vipera aspis var. hugii — De Betta, 1883; Vipera aspis var. hugyi — Schreiber, 1912; Vipera latastei var. hugyi — Calabresi, 1924; Vipera aspis forma trans. rudolphi-italica A.F. Reuss, 1924; Vipera aspis hugyi — Mertens & L. Müller, 1928; Rhinaspis (Latasteopara) ocellata hugii — A.F. Reuss, 1935; Vipera ammodytes hugyi — Schwarz, 1936; Vipera aspis montecristi Mertens, 1956; Vipera (Rhinaspis) aspis hugyi — Obst, 1983; Vipera (Rhinaspis) aspis montecristi — Obst, 1983

Subspecies of snake

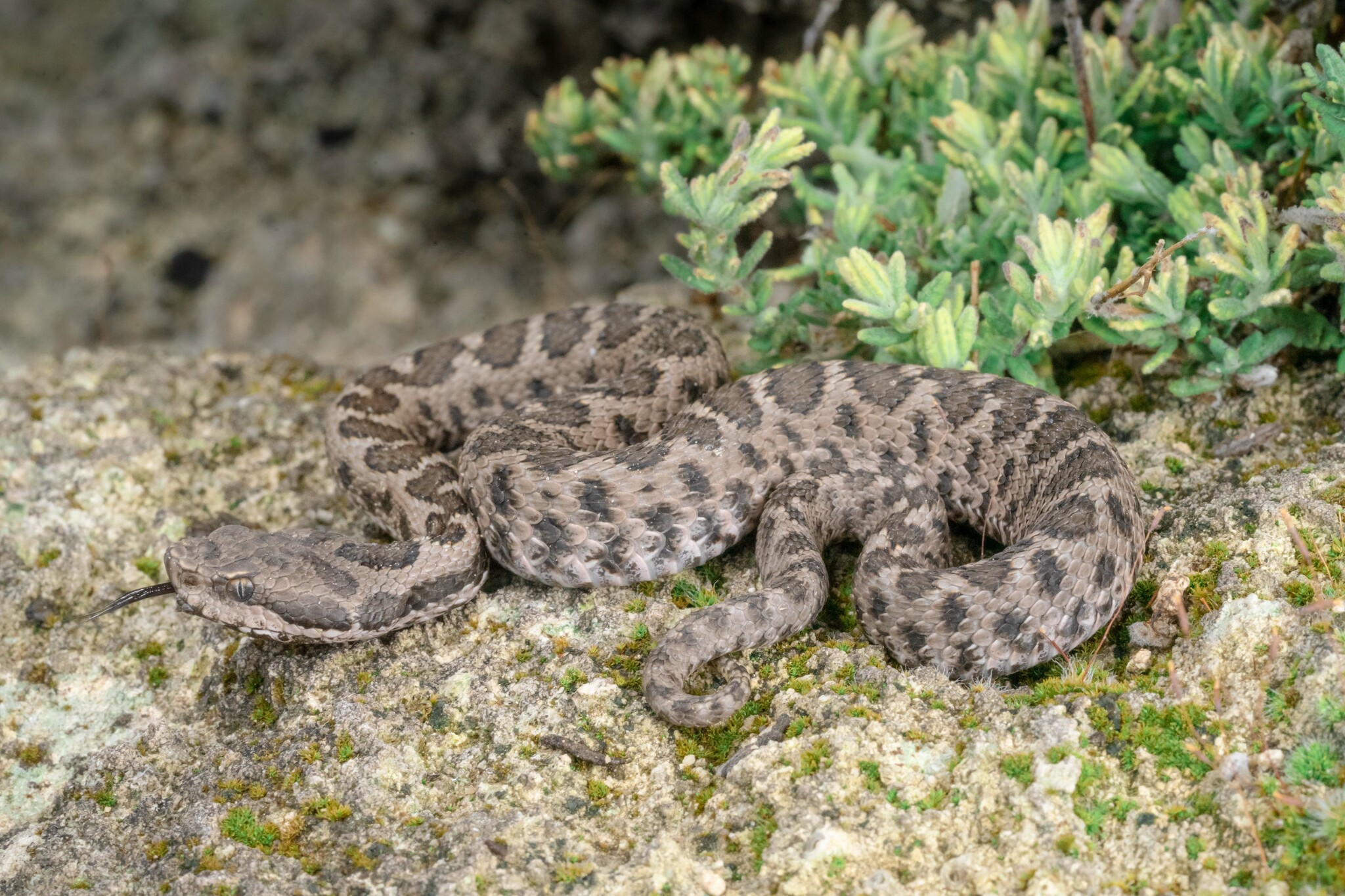
Vipera aspis hugyi, Taranto, Italy, 2020

Common names: Southern Italian asp, South-Italian asp viper, more.

Vipera aspis hugyi is a venomous viper subspecies endemic to southern Italy.

== Description ==
Usually, it is marked with a fused zigzag stripe and has a distinctly raised snout. Specimens from Montecristo Island, sometimes referred to as V. a. montecristi, are similar, but with a reduced tendency for the dorsal markings to fuse.

== Common names ==
The species is also known as the Southern Italian asp, the South-Italian asp viper, or Hugy's viper. Previously, several other common names were used to describe a subspecies that is now part of the synonymy of this form, the Monte Cristo viper or Monte Cristo asp viper for Vipera aspis montecristi.

== Geographic range ==
It is found in Italy in Apulia, Basilicata, Calabria, Sicily and Montecristo Island.
