= Montioni =

- Frazione
- Location of Montioni in Italy
- Coordinates: 43°0′48″N 10°45′36″E
- Country: Italy
- Region: Tuscany
- Province: Livorno (LI)
- Comune: Suvereto
- Elevation: 92 m (302 ft)

Population (2001)
  - Total: 15
- Time zone: UTC+1 (CET)
  - Summer (DST): UTC+2 (CEST)
- Postal code: 57028
- Dialing code: (+39) 0565

Montioni is a village in Tuscany, central Italy, administratively a frazione of the comune of Suvereto, province of Livorno. At the time of the 2001 census its population was 15.

The village is about 86 km from Livorno and 14 km from Suvereto.

== Bibliography ==
- Emanuele Repetti (1835). "Montioni". Dizionario Geografico Fisico Storico della Toscana. Florence.
