= Pierfrancesco the Younger =

Italian banker (1487–1525)

Pierfrancesco II de' Medici
- Born: 1487; Florence, Republic of Florence
- Died: 1525 (aged 38); Cafaggiolo, Republic of Florence
- Noble family: Medici
- Spouse: Maria Soderini
- Issue: Laudomia de' Medici; Lorenzino de' Medici; Giuliano de' Medici; Maddalena de' Medici
- Father: Lorenzo de' Medici
- Mother: Semiramide Appiano

Pierfrancesco di Lorenzo de' Medici (1487–1525), known also as Pierfrancesco II de' Medici or Pierfrancesco il Giovane ("the Younger") to distinguish him by his grandfather Pierfrancesco, was an Italian banker and a member of the House of Medici.

He was born in Florence, the son of Lorenzo il Popolano. Differently from the latter, he did not take in part in the city's politics, acting as Florentine ambassador only one time in 1522 in the Papal States.

In 1511 he married Maria Soderini. They had four children, including the infamous Lorenzino, killer of Duke Alessandro de' Medici.

Pierfrancesco died at Cafaggiolo in 1525.
