= Prata, Suvereto =

Prata
- Frazione
- Location of Prata in Italy
- Coordinates: 43°5′39″N 10°39′34″E
- Country: Italy
- Region: Tuscany
- Province: Livorno (LI)
- Comune: Suvereto
- Elevation: 205 m (673 ft)

Population (2011)
  - Total: 66
- Time zone: UTC+1 (CET)
  - Summer (DST): UTC+2 (CEST)
- Postal code: 57028
- Dialing code: (+39) 0565

Prata is a village in Tuscany, central Italy, administratively a frazione of the comune of Suvereto, province of Livorno. At the time of the 2011 census its population was 66.

Prata is about 72 km from Livorno and 4 km from Suvereto.
