= Iacopo IV Appiani =

Lord of Pimobino

Iacopo IV Appiani (1459 – 10 April 1510) was an Italian condottiero and lord of Piombino of the Appiani dynasty in the Renaissance.

He was born in Piombino, the son of Iacopo III Appiani, of whom he continued the traditional alliance with the Aragonese court of Naples. He was captain of the Neapolitan Army (1479–1483), of the Este army (1483–1485) and of the army of the Republics of Siena (1495–1498) and Florence (1498–1501). Later he served the king of France and Ferdinand II of Aragon.

In 1501 his territories in southern Tuscany were occupied by Cesare Borgia, but Iacopo returned in 1503 after the death of Borgia's power protector and father, Pope Alexander VI. In this period he received Leonardo da Vinci in his court. In 1509 he was made Prince of the Holy Roman Empire.

He died at Piombino in 1510.

Preceded by Iacopo III Appiani	Lord of Piombino; 1474–1510	Succeeded by Iacopo V Appiani
