= Caterina Appiani =

Caterina Appiani (1398 – 19 December 1451) was the lady of Piombino of the Appiani dynasty from 1445 until her death.

She was born in Piombino, the first daughter of Gherardo Appiani, lord of that principality. She succeeded her mother Paola Colonna thanks to the army of her husband, the condottiero Rinaldo Orsini, whom she had married in 1440 and who had already supported her mother. When Rinaldo died, Caterina was forced to leave Piombino to her uncle Emanuele Appiani.

She died in 1451 at Scarlino.

Preceded by Paola Colonna	Lady of Piombino (with Rinaldo Orsini); 1445–1451	Succeeded by Emanuele Appiani
