= Introduced mammals on seabird breeding islands =

Seabirds include some of the most threatened taxa anywhere in the world. For example, of extant albatross species, 82% are listed as threatened, endangered, or critically endangered by the International Union for Conservation of Nature. The two leading threats to seabirds are accidental bycatch by commercial fishing operations and introduced mammals on their breeding islands. Mammals are typically brought to remote islands by humans either accidentally as stowaways on ships, or deliberately for hunting, ranching, or biological control of previously introduced species. Introduced mammals have a multitude of negative effects on seabirds including direct and indirect effects. Direct effects include predation and disruption of breeding activities, and indirect effects include habitat transformation due to overgrazing and major shifts in nutrient cycling due to a halting of nutrient subsidies from seabird excrement. There are other invasive species on islands that wreak havoc on native bird populations (e.g. brown snakes on Guam), but mammals are by far the most commonly introduced species to islands and the most detrimental to breeding seabirds. Despite efforts to remove introduced mammals from these remote islands, invasive mammals are still present on roughly 80% of islands worldwide.

Two comprehensive sources for the current state of island invasions and island invasive eradications are the Threatened Island Biodiversity database (TIB) and the Database of Island Invasive Species Eradications (DIISE).

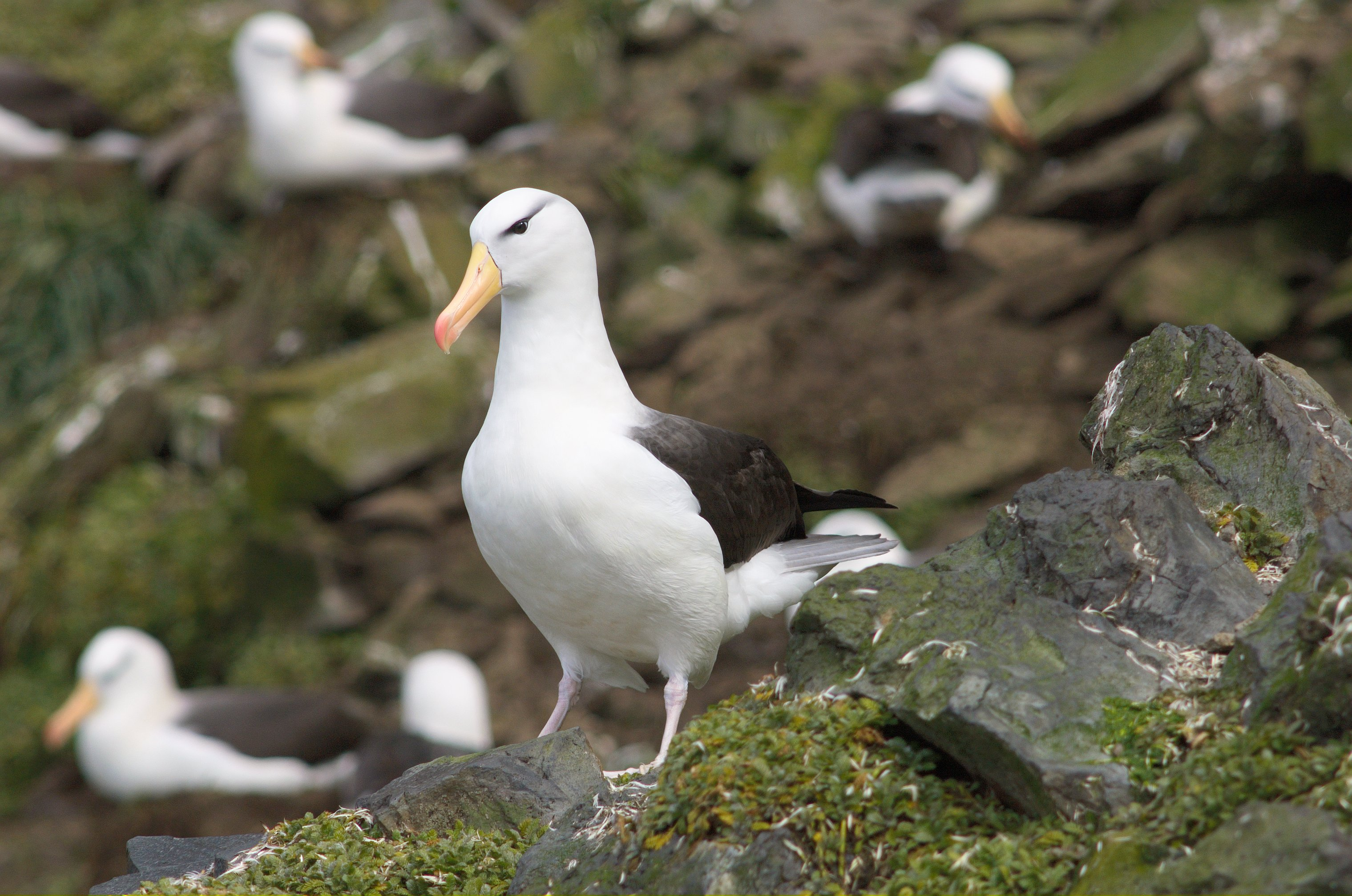
A black-browed albatross at its colony in the Kerguelen Islands.

== Species commonly introduced ==
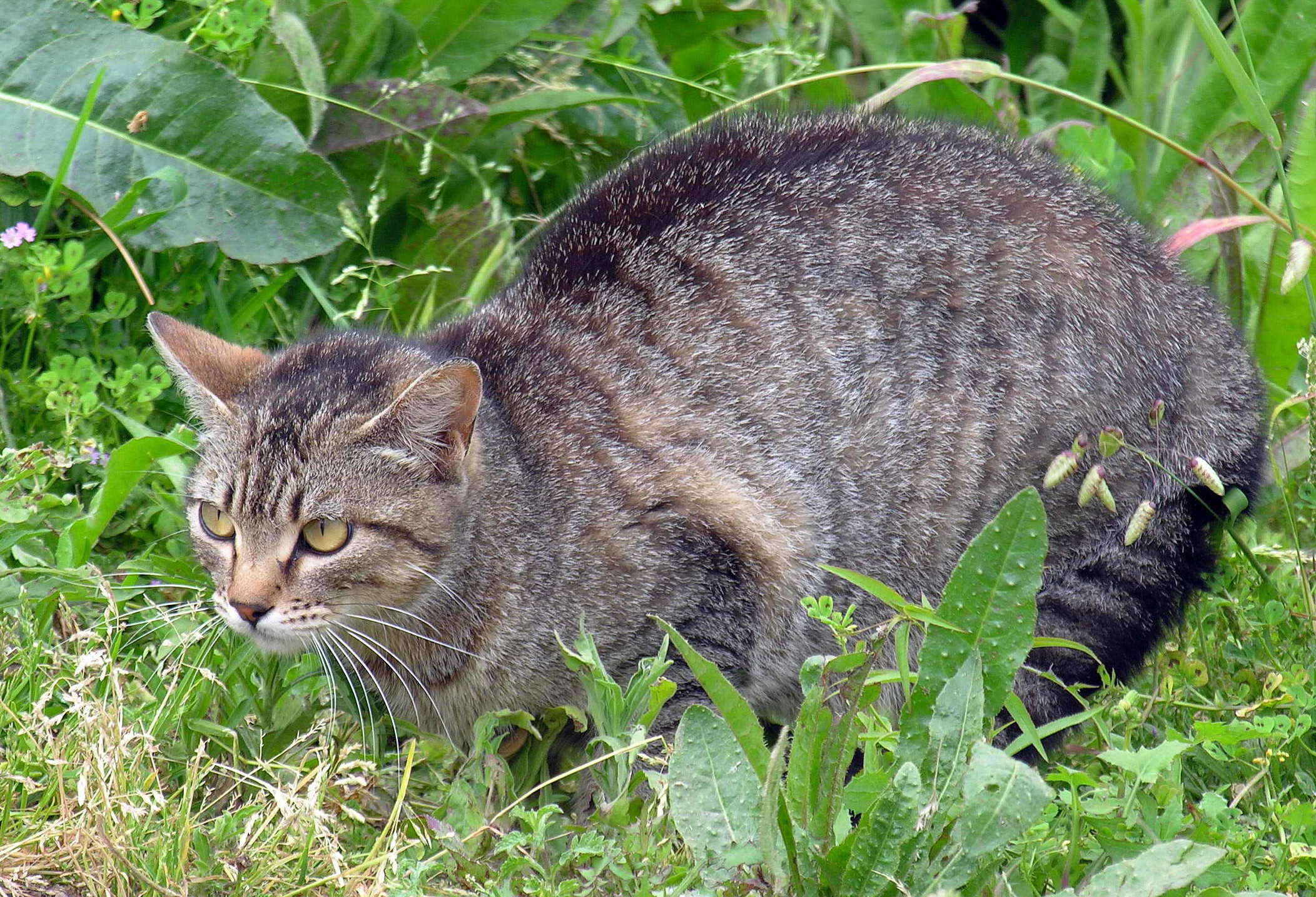
Feral cats are one of the most efficient predators on ground-nesting seabirds. Since many seabirds have not evolved with terrestrial predators, they have no defenses against feral cats and often do not even recognize them as a threat.

=== Cats ===
Feral cats (Felis catus) are one of the most commonly introduced mammals and one of the most effective predators on ground-nesting seabirds. On the Kerguelen Islands in the Southern Ocean, cats kill 1.2 million nesting seabirds annually. One study stated that introduced feral cats have been responsible for the extinction of 10 petrel species in the 20th century alone. Feral cats are such effective predators on ground-nesting seabirds because seabirds did not evolve with terrestrial predators and therefore did not develop defenses against them. In many cases, seabirds do not even recognize feral cats as a threat. It has also been demonstrated that feral cats on islands preferentially eat seabirds, but during the nonbreeding season cats switch their prey base to insects, rats, and mice for subsistence.

=== Rats ===
Rats are by far the most common introduced mammals on seabird islands. Currently, approximately 80% of islands worldwide have populations of introduced rats. The most common introduced species is the Norway rat (Rattus norvegicus), but black rats (R. rattus, also known as “ship rat”) and Polynesian rats (R. exulans) have found their way to offshore islands and have subsequently decimated populations of breeding seabirds. Norway rats are thought to be the most destructive due to their high rates of population growth and extreme ecological plasticity that allows them to live in a wide variety of habitats and climates. Introduced rats have been shown to negatively impact 75 species of seabirds in 10 different families; smaller burrow-nesting seabirds such as storm petrels and shearwaters are the most negatively affected, while larger, surface-nesting birds such as gulls seem to be the least impacted due to their ability to defend their eggs and chicks.

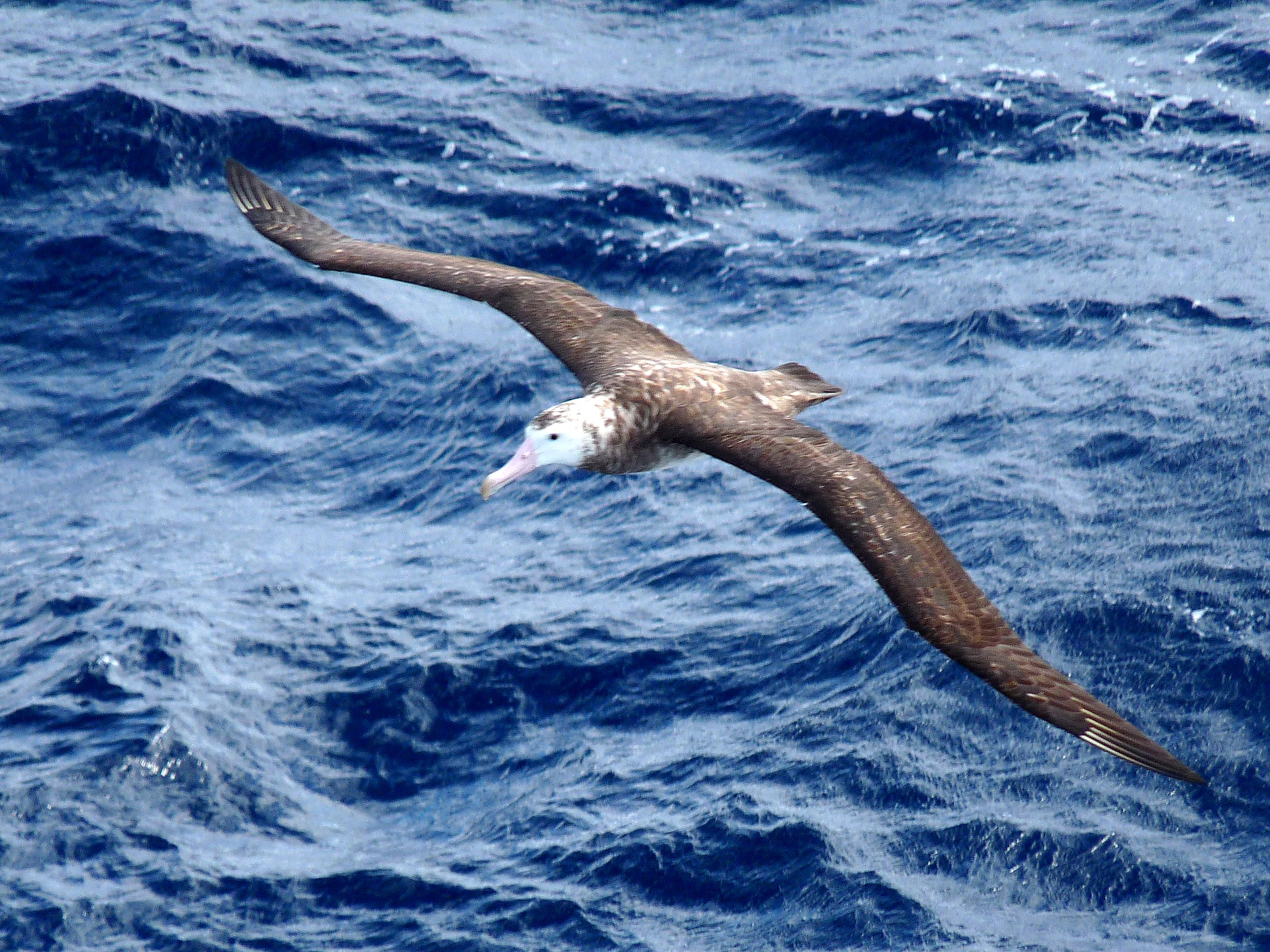
An adult Tristan albatross in flight. This species' population has been devastated by invasive, predatory mice on their breeding colony at Gough Island over the past two centuries.

=== Mice ===
Mice are another commonly introduced mammal to islands. The species usually introduced is the cosmopolitan house mouse (Mus musculus). Like rats, house mice have a high intrinsic growth rate and are exceptionally adaptable to a wide range of ecological conditions and therefore can persist on a majority of the world's islands. On the mainland, mice eat mainly grains and insects; however, on tiny, remote islands these food items are frequently unavailable, forcing the mice to adapt and prey on seabird eggs and chicks.

The most spectacular example of this is on Gough Island, a small island in the middle of the south Atlantic. Mice made it to Gough Island in the 19th century and began shifting their prey base to mainly seabird chicks. One of the largest and most endangered species of seabird in the world, the Tristan albatross (Diomedea dabbenena) nests mainly on this island and do so because of its historical lack of terrestrial predators. The mice introduced to Gough Island have evolved to eat exclusively albatross chicks and grow to twice the size of a normal house mouse on average as a result. Even though the albatross chicks are massive compared to the mice, the chicks do not recognize mice as a threat and allow the mice to eat them alive while they sit at their nests.

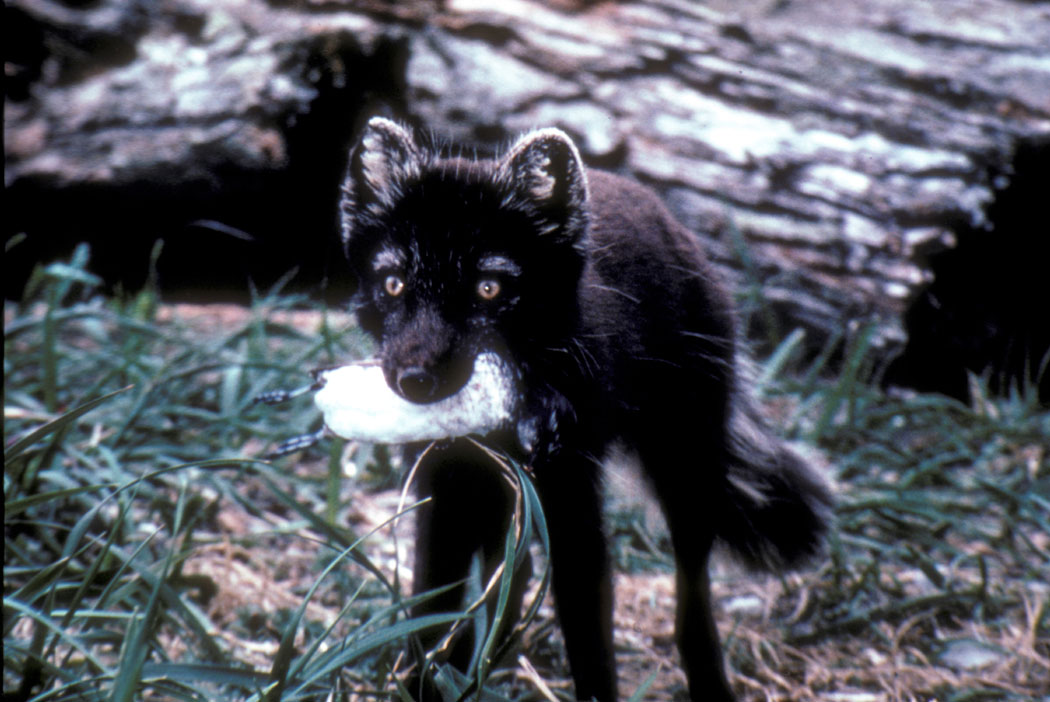
An introduced Arctic fox captures a least auklet on the Aleutian Islands, Alaska.

=== Foxes ===
Where introduced, Arctic (Alopex lagopus) and red foxes (Vulpes vulpes) are extremely adept predators on ground-nesting seabirds. Foxes are able to depredate both adult and young seabirds because these seabirds have never had to develop a defense against these predators. Foxes have been present on the Aleutian Island chain in Alaska since the 1700s and have drastically reduced seabird populations and even extirpated species from certain islands. Patagonian fox (Lycalopex griseus) has also been introduced to the Falkland Islands, home to some of the largest seabird colonies in the world.

=== Raccoons ===
Raccoons (Procyon lotor) are omnivorous mammals that can subsist on a diet of seabird eggs and chicks where they are introduced. Raccoons decrease seabird breeding success; for example, in 2004 raccoons were introduced to gull breeding colonies in the Isles of Shoals, Maine. Islands without raccoons were 17 times more likely to hatch and fledge chicks than islands with introduced raccoons present. In another example, raccoons introduced to the Scott Islands, British Columbia, in the 1930s devastated what was the largest aggregation of breeding seabirds in the eastern Pacific south of Alaska.

=== Rabbits ===
The most recent report indicates that rabbits have been introduced on over 800 islands worldwide. However, this report is nearly 20 years old and more introductions have certainly happened since that time. Through grazing, rabbits alter the vegetative environment of islands that seabirds depend on for breeding activities.

=== Livestock ===
There is a long history of introducing livestock to offshore islands in an attempt to incite ranching and establish permanent human residence on these islands. The negative effects of grazing animals on island ecosystems is mainly through change in the vegetation cover, but these animals also have direct effects on breeding populations of seabirds through the trampling of nests and chicks. There is even an instance of pigs digging up burrows and consuming endangered Townsend's shearwaters (Puffinus auricularis) in the Revillagigedo Islands off the western coast of Mexico.

== Methods of introduction and establishment ==
Most seabirds breed on islands that are hundreds or even thousands of kilometers from the mainland; therefore, the most common way mammals get to these islands is by anthropogenic means. People have brought mammals to islands both intentionally and accidentally. Regardless of their method of introduction, once invasive mammals establish populations on these islands, their populations grow rapidly due to the quick and effective filling of empty niches as well as the seemingly endless supply of easy-to-capture food in the form of unsuspecting seabirds, mainly eggs and chicks.

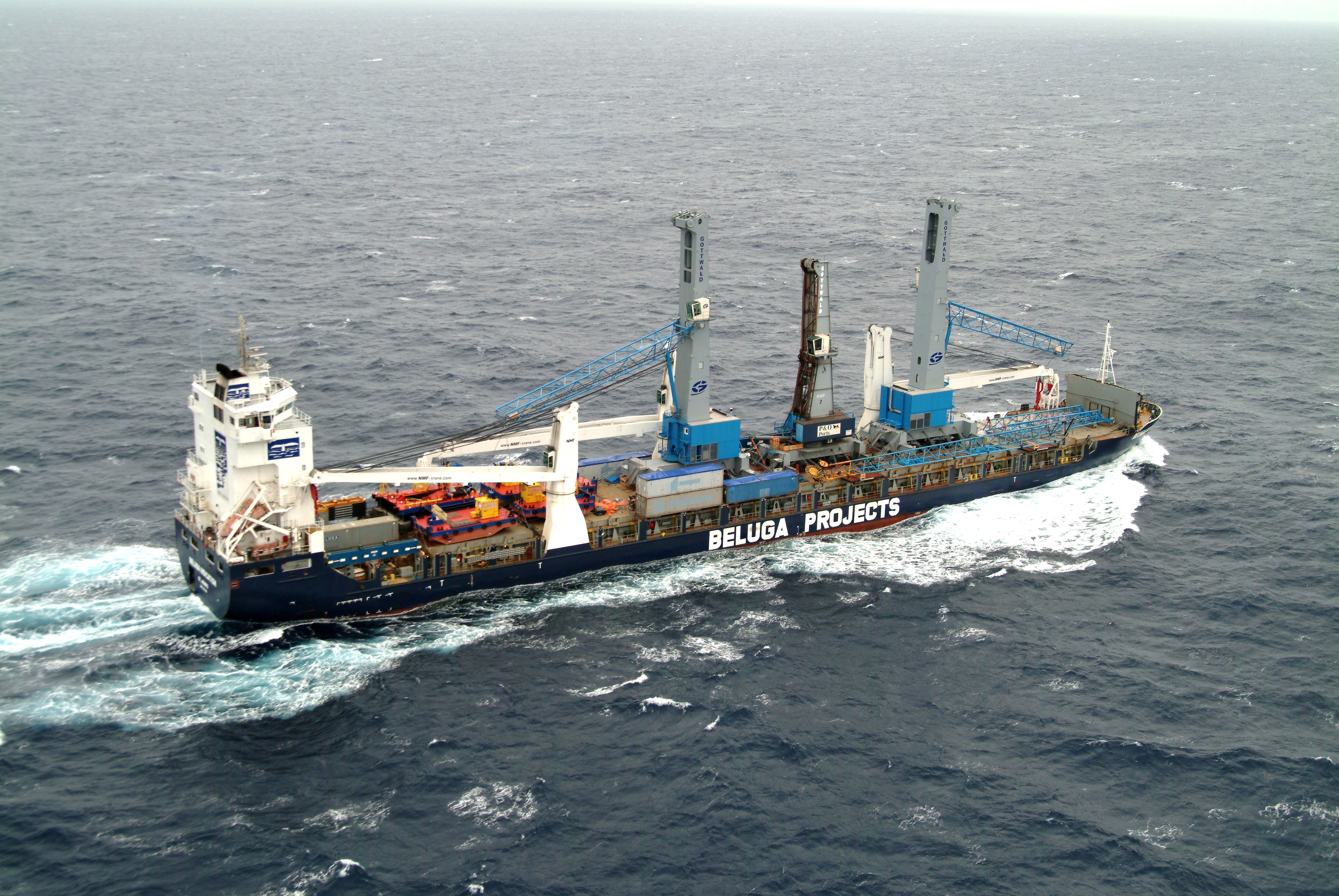
Many mammals introduced to islands worldwide arrive as stowaways aboard cargo ships.

=== Accidental ===
Rodents usually make it to islands as stowaways aboard ships. Once these ships reach islands, mice and/or rats escape and establish populations on islands. Due to their high intrinsic rates of population growth and extreme ecological plasticity in both their diet and habitat preferences, their abundance often increases astronomically just a few years after their introduction. Of the 328 species of true seabirds worldwide, over 30% of them are listed as threatened or endangered by the IUCN, and rodents introduced accidentally to islands are thought to be seabird's greatest terrestrial threat. Usually, these rats and mice have to adapt their diets upon reaching islands, but once they do so, there is very little keeping their populations in check. Furthermore, in cases where islands already have native populations of insular, small mammals they are often driven towards extinction by the more aggressive and plastic invaders. Because of these reasons, rat and mouse eradication on islands is prioritized over any other foreign species removal.

=== Intentional ===
There are also many examples of humans purposefully introducing mammals to remote islands. There are three main reasons why people deliberately introduce mammals to islands. The first is to initiate ranching and agriculture on the islands as a precursor to establishing permanent human residence. The second reason is for hunting purposes with the financial backing of sport-hunters and fur-trading companies. The third reason is as a form of biological control on other invasive species that have been previously released on islands. Releasing cats to control rodent populations is the most common example of this; ironically, the cats that are released are far more efficient predators on native seabirds than the rodents they were meant to control.

== Effects of introduced mammals ==
The negative effects of introduced mammals on seabird breeding islands are extreme, highly varied, and can be felt almost immediately after the introduction event.

=== Direct ===
Direct effects of introduced mammals on breeding seabirds are the most noticeable effects. Predation is the most common form of direct effect and greatly influences hatching and fledging success of seabirds. Predation by introduced rats alone has been implicated as the major cause for at least 11 seabird extinctions worldwide. In some cases, skilled predators such as foxes or cats even prey on adult birds. The introduction of cats and their subsequent predation on adult Guadalupe storm petrels (Oceanodroma macrodactyla) is believed to be the main cause of this species’ extinction in the early 20th century.

In addition to predation, there are other direct ways in which introduced mammals can negatively affect breeding seabird populations. Larger grazing animals such as cattle can trample seabird nests, burrows, eggs, and chicks. One study examining the influence of Norway rats on the reproductive success of least auklets (Aethia pusilla) found that even though there wasn't much evidence for predation, the overall reproductive success of the colony decreased significantly due to rats disrupting adult auklets attempting to brood or provision young chicks. Rabbits also affect seabird nesting success. They contend for nest sites, alter existing burrows, and cause physical damage to eggs and chicks. Introduced mammals can also have compound direct effects on colonies of breeding seabirds. In addition to consuming eggs and chicks, introduced pigs also dig up and destroy burrows of nesting seabirds. Feral cats often disturb breeding seabirds to the point where adults abandon their nests. Cats also frequently kill more seabirds than they actually consume, a behavior called surplus killing.

=== Indirect ===
Introduced mammals also have a multitude of indirect effects on seabirds that might not be as obvious as the direct effects. Cattle, rabbits, goats, and other introduced grazing animals drastically change the vegetative cover of islands, increasing soil erosion by an order of magnitude. This drastically changes island form and habitat types, to which breeding seabirds are very sensitive. An example of this can be seen on Cabbage Tree Island, Australia where the threatened Gould's petrel (Pterodroma leucoptera) nests. As introduced rabbits overgrazed the forest understory, these burrowing petrels became exposed to predators and vulnerable to entanglement in the sticky fruits of the bird-lime tree (Pisonia umbellifera).

There have also been more complex indirect interactions describing how introduced mammals can indirectly affect seabird breeding populations. On the Aleutian Island chain in Alaska, over 10 million seabirds form dense colonies and many are greatly affected by the direct predation of introduced Arctic foxes. However, recent research has shown that seabirds drastically alter the flora of their breeding islands by subsidizing nutrients for plants with their excrement. Once these colonies are decimated by introduced predators, the nutrient cycling is interrupted and the plant communities on the islands change drastically. Some of the remaining seabirds have trouble adapting to this rapid change in vegetation and are forced to breed elsewhere or suffer lower reproductive success.

== Mitigation/eradication of introduced mammals ==
The massive negative impacts of introduced mammals on breeding seabirds and island biodiversity is well known and widely reported; therefore, large-scale efforts are currently in place to either mitigate these impacts or eradicate introduced mammals off islands completely. However, the effectiveness of methods currently employed is still being debated.

=== Exclosure ===
In certain situations, predator exclosure structures (allowing adult birds to freely move in and out of the nest site to brood/provision chicks, but preventing mammalian predators from attacking the eggs, chicks, or adults) have proven successful. Most studies investigating the effectiveness of predator exclosures have used ducks or shorebirds as a study system. Applying these ideas for true seabirds might prove impractical due to the density and locations where seabirds nest.

Առնետի թույնով պատված հատիկներ՝ կղզիներից ինվազիվ առնետներին ընդմիշտ վերացնելու ամենաարդյունավետ մեթոդներից մեկը։

=== Eradication ===
The most common method used today to nullify the effects of introduced mammals on seabird colonies is by partial or complete eradication. Introduced goats have been successfully eradicated from 120 islands worldwide. To do so, scientists use a combination of tools to locate and remove goats including global positioning systems (GPS), geographic information systems (GIS), aerial hunting via helicopter, hunting dogs, and herding (Judas) goats. Using this multifaceted approach, large populations of goats (>20,000 individuals) have been eradicated from islands in only a few years.

There have been attempts on 387 islands worldwide to eradicate rodents and the most recent synthesis of results show that on 284 of those islands, rodents have been completely exterminated. Rodenticides have been used in over 99% of these eradication campaigns utilizing three methods of deployment: 1) bait stations 2) hand broadcasting and 3) aerial broadcasting. Bait stations are optimal for minimizing nontarget impacts and other forms of unintentional environmental harm from the poison, but this method is labor-intensive and can be impossible given the topography of some islands. Aerial distribution of rodenticide by helicopter is now the most common method, but a combination of methods is often the most effective.

Feral cats have proven more difficult to completely remove from islands. Of the 48 islands feral cats have been completely removed from in the past half century, only 10 have been on islands larger than 10km2. Similar to goat eradications, the most effective cat eradication technique is to combine several approaches including hunting, live trapping, poisoned bait stations, and even releasing feline viruses amongst cat populations. On smaller islands, cat eradication is more straightforward, but it can prove extremely difficult on larger islands with human populations. Due to the high level of interaction between humans and feral cats on these islands, poisoned bait stations and feline viruses have to be used sparingly or not at all.

One of the leading organizations employing the technique of invasive eradication for the benefit of breeding seabirds is Island Conservation.

=== Effectiveness ===
There have been many who have debated whether invasive mammal eradication campaigns are effective enough considering the non-target and environmental impacts of the methods used, the cost, and even those who believe the problem of introduced mammals on islands is overstated. However, since introduced mammals pose such a threat to biodiversity worldwide, the pervading thought is that action must be taken to remove these invasive mammals from islands. Many studies have shown overwhelming effectiveness of individual eradication campaigns, including partial or complete recovery of seabird populations. Reviews have shown that over 70% of rat and 90% of goat eradication campaigns that have been attempted have successfully ridded the islands of these invasive mammals. Additionally, while concerns persist that island ecosystems take centuries to recover after the removal of invasive mammals, recent research suggests that, if managed properly, islands might take only a couple years to a couple decades to recover.

== See also ==
- Albatross
- Biodiversity
- Threats to biodiversity
- Human impact on the environment
- International Union for Conservation of Nature
- Introduced species
- Invasion biology terminology
- Island Conservation
- Island restoration
- Penguin
- Procellariiformes
- Reindeer in South Georgia
- Seabird
