= Iacopo VI Appiani =

Italian aristocrat (1539–1585)

Iacopo (Note: Also spelt Jacopo.) VI Appiani (1539 – 15 May 1585) was the lord of Piombino from 1545 until his death, although he was expelled from his state between 1548 and 1557. He was the son and heir of Iacopo V and his wife, Elena, daughter of Giacomo Salviati. He was a child when he succeeded his father, and was placed under the protection of the Emperor Charles V, while his mother presided over a council of regency.

In 1548, Charles invested Cosimo I de' Medici. Duke of Florence, with Piombino in exchange for a cash payment. Iacopo and his mother fled to the Republic of Genoa, which intervened several times to prevent Cosimo from taking possession of Piombino. Iacopo and Elena then paid a visit to the imperial court, where, with the help of certain ministers opposed to the Medici, they convinced Charles to revoke his investiture of Cosimo, save for the island of Elba.

Preceded by Iacopo V Appiani	Lord of Piombino	Succeeded by Alessandro Appiani
