= Portrait of a Young Man (Rosso Fiorentino) =

Painting by Rosso Fiorentino (c. 1518)

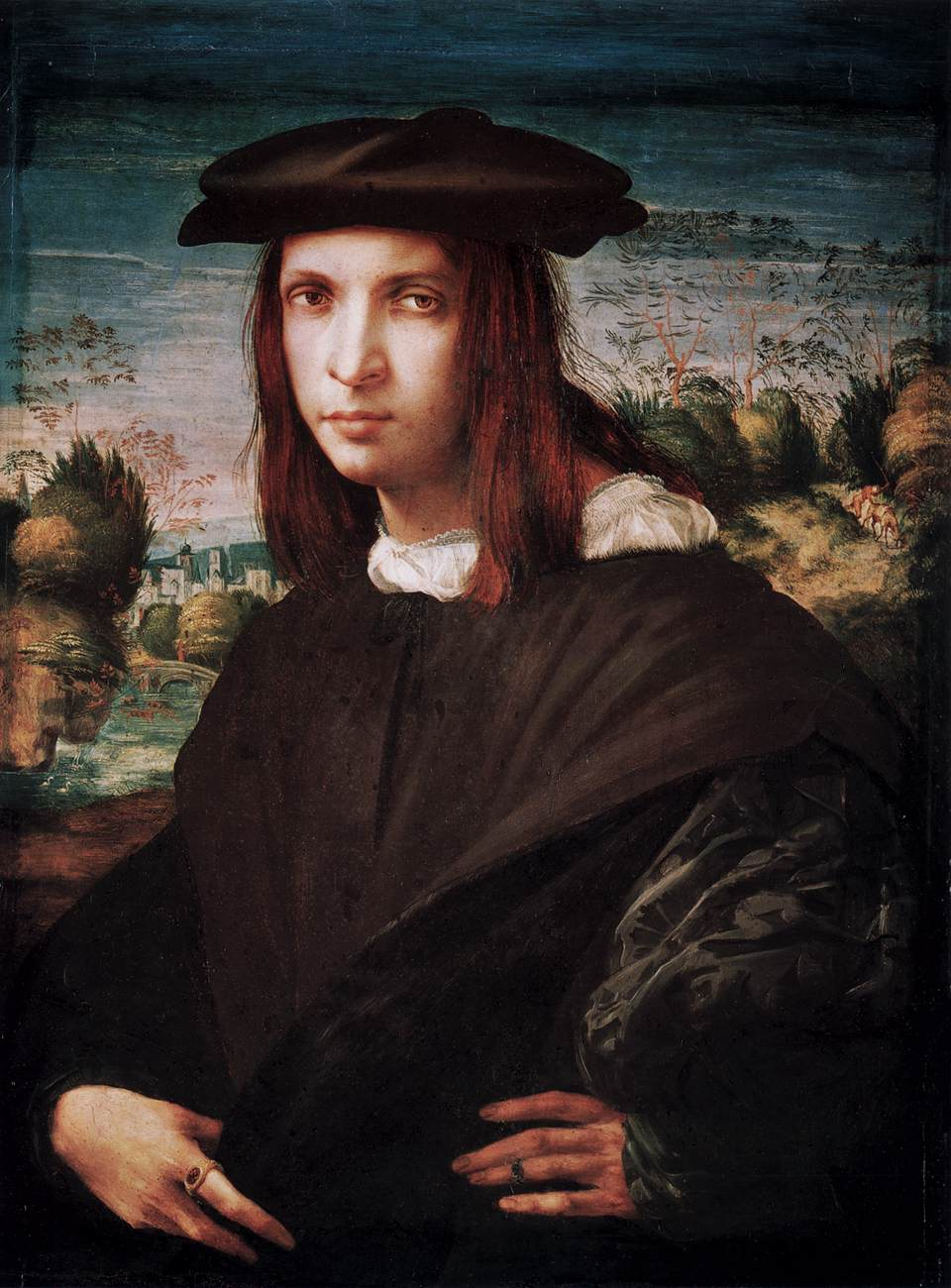
- Artist: Rosso Fiorentino
- Year: c. 1517-1518
- Medium: oil on wood
- Dimensions: 82.4 by 59.9 centimetres (32.4 in × 23.6 in)
- Location: Gemäldegalerie, Berlin

Portrait of a Young Man is an oil painting on wood by the Italian Mannerist painter Rosso Fiorentino, executed c. 1517–1518, now in the Gemäldegalerie, in Berlin.

== History ==
In his Lives of the Artists, Vasari briefly mentions that many portraits by him could still be seen in Florentine homes, probably produced before Rosso left for Volterra in 1521 – this work is thought to be one of them. Its attribution was uncertain until 2006, when Antonio Natali identified it as an early autograph work by Rosso.

In the early 1900s it was thought to be a self-portrait of Rosso, but other sources argue that it instead shows Iacopo V Appiani, sovereign of Piombino, and was linked to Rosso's long stay in the city-state of Piombino in 1516–1520, during which he produced a Dead Christ.

== Description ==
Against the backdrop of a windswept open-air landscape, where a distant city can be glimpsed through small trees and bushes, stands a young man in half-length, dressed in black and turned three-quarters to the left, in a slightly hunched pose with his head turned toward the viewer. He wears a black, floppy, wide-brimmed hat, has long hair, and youthful features, with a straight, strong nose, large, deeply shaded eyes, and a full mouth. The composition harks back to contemporary examples by Andrea del Sarto and Franciabigio, including the psychological relationship between sitter and viewer, which in this case settles into a benevolent balance, despite the insistent, indolent gaze, imbued with a sort of mysterious and feminine detachment. The attribution to Rosso has been supported by the anatomical rendering of the hooked and frayed hand pressing on the side, while the vaporous damask velvet sleeve, which is in the foreground on the right, appears to be a tribute to Raphael's La velata.

== See also ==
- Portrait of a Man (Rosso Fiorentino)
