= Iacopo V Appiani =

Iacopo V Appiani (1480 – 20 October 1545) was the lord of Piombino of the Appiani (or Appiano) dynasty from 1511 until his death.

He was born in Piombino, the son of Iacopo IV Appiani, 1st Prince of Piombino and Princess Victoria Todeschini-Piccolomini. Iacopo V's paternal grandfather was Jacopo III, the 3rd lord of Piombino and Battistini Kampofregozo and of the daughter of Doge of Genoa Jano I. His maternal grandfather was Antonio, the 1st Duke of Amalfi from Todeschini-Piccolomini, and of Princess Mary d'Aragona, illegitimate daughter of the Ferdinand the Ist, the King of Naples.

Like his predecessors, he initially allied with the Aragonese of Naples, in his case by marrying Marianna of Aragon in 1510, widow of Roberto II Sanseverino. After Marianna's death, he married three granddaughters of Lorenzo de' Medici and nieces of Pope Leo X: Emilia Ridolfi (daughter of Contessina de' Medici); she died soon afterwards, and Jacopo remarried to her younger sister Clarice. After her death, he married a fourth time to Elena Salviati, daughter of Lucrezia de' Medici. By Elena, he had two sons, after his first three marriages was without issue: Iacopo VI and Alfonso. He had also an illegitimate son who died in infancy by Giulia, a lady-in-waiting of Elena: Alfonsino.

He is sometimes argued to be the subject of Rosso Fiorentino's Portrait of a Young Man (Berlin). He was succeeded by his son Iacopo VI. His other son Alfonso was an admiral in the Navy of the Grand Duchy of Tuscany.

Preceded by Iacopo IV Appiani	Lord of Piombino; 1511–1545	Succeeded by Iacopo VI Appiani
