= Principality of Piombino =

1398–1805 state in Tuscany, Italy

Principality of Piombino Principato di Piombino (Italian)
- 1398–1805
- Flag (until 1628) Appiani (Coat of arms)

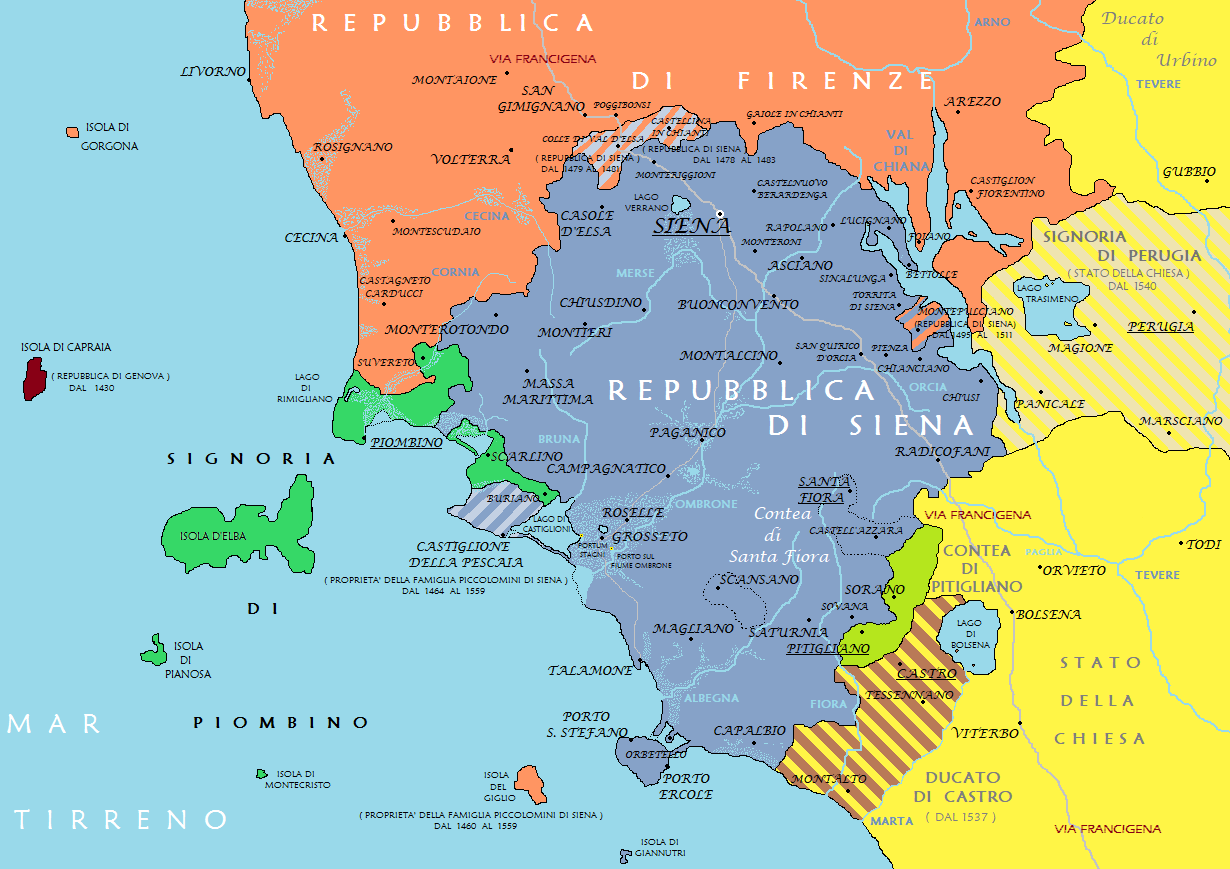
- Principality of Piombino between 15th and 16th centuries

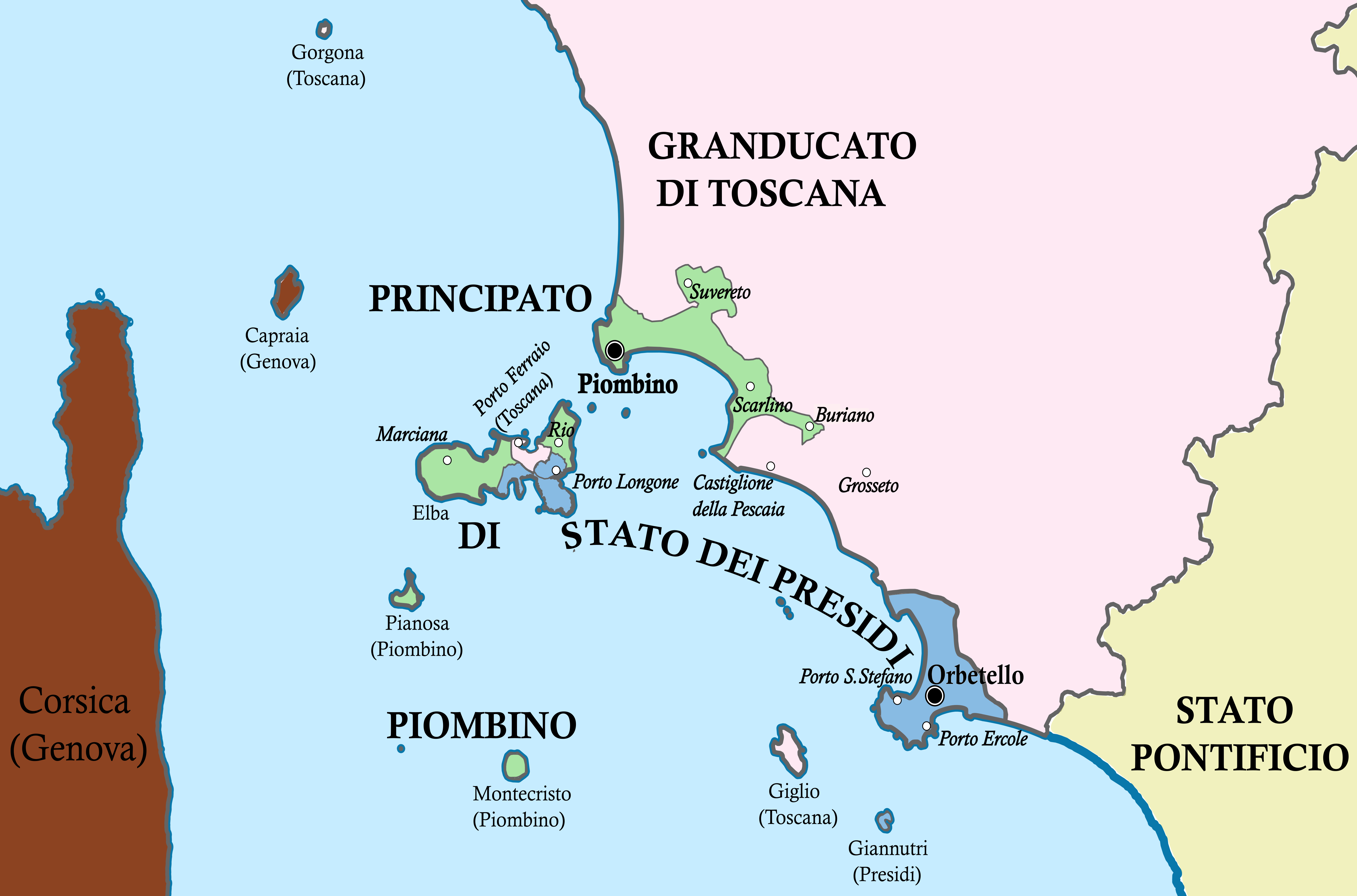
- Principality of Piombino and nearby Italian states around mid-18th century
- Status: Lordship (until 1594); Principality (since 1594)
- Capital: Piombino
- Official languages: Latin; Italian
- Religion: Catholicism
- Government: Monarchy
  - 1398–1405: Gherardo Appiani (first lord)
  - 1777–1801: Antonio II Boncompagni Ludovisi (last prince)
- Historical era: Middle Ages
  - Established: 1398
  - Raised to principality: 1594
  - Prince deposed by French troops: 1799 and 1803
  - Treaty of Florence: 28 March 1801
  - Annexed by French- controlled Lucca: June 23, 1805
  - Granted to Tuscany: 1815
Preceded by	Succeeded by
Republic of Pisa	Principality of Lucca and Piombino

Boncompagni’s flag

The Lordship of Piombino (Signoria di Piombino), and after 1594 the Principality of Piombino (Principato di Piombino), was a small state on the Italian Peninsula centered on the town of Piombino and including part of the island of Elba. A vassal of the Kingdom of Naples associated with the State of the Presidios and a territory of the Holy Roman Empire formed from the remnants of the Republic of Pisa, it existed from 1399 to 1805, when it was merged into the Principality of Lucca and Piombino. In 1815 it was absorbed into the Grand Duchy of Tuscany.

== History ==
=== Founding and early history of the Lordship of Piombino (1399–1445) ===
On 19 February 1399 Gherardo Appiani ceded Pisa and the majority of its territories, which his family had owned since 1392, to the Visconti of Milan for 200,000 florins, reserving the commune of Piombino for himself and his successors; moreover, he also took possession of Populonia, Suvereto, Scarlino, Buriano, Abbey of San Pancrazio al Fango and the islands of Pianosa, Montecristo, and Elba; forming a newly established state, the Lordship of Piombino.

Gherardo had his residence built in Piombino in the small square (now Piazza Bovio) and on his death, in 1405, he left the state to his son Iacopo II. The latter, born in 1400, for the first years, was under the tutelage of his mother, Donna Paola Colonna. During the years of regency and afterwards, the politics of the Appiani family were oriented first towards an alliance (obtaining protection with a deed of pardon) with the Republic of Florence, then that of Siena, and finally again with Florence.

=== Orsini rule and Appiani restoration (1445–1501) ===
When Paola Colonna Appiano died in 1445, the Appiani heir to the lordship Emanuele, son of Gherardo, was forcibly disinherited by his brother-in-law Rinaldo Orsini.

In 1447, Orsini erected a ravelin to better defend Piombino, in anticipation of Emanuele Appiani attempting to re-take the lordship. Allying with Alfonso V, King of Aragon and Naples, Emanuele besieged Piombino in 1448, also obtaining Sienese and Florentine help. After four months of useless attempts, the siege was abandoned and Rinaldo Orsini ruled the lordship until his death from the plague in 1450.

After Rinaldo Orsini's wife Caterina Appiani died in 1451, the Council of Elders of Piombino proclaimed the disinherited Emanuele Appiani as lord.

Emanuele was succeeded as Lord of Piombino by Iacopo III, who became a patron of Andrea Guardi, a Florentine architect and sculptor. Between 1465 and 1470 many works were carried out which changed the appearance of the city.

=== Warfare and contested rule (1501–1594) ===
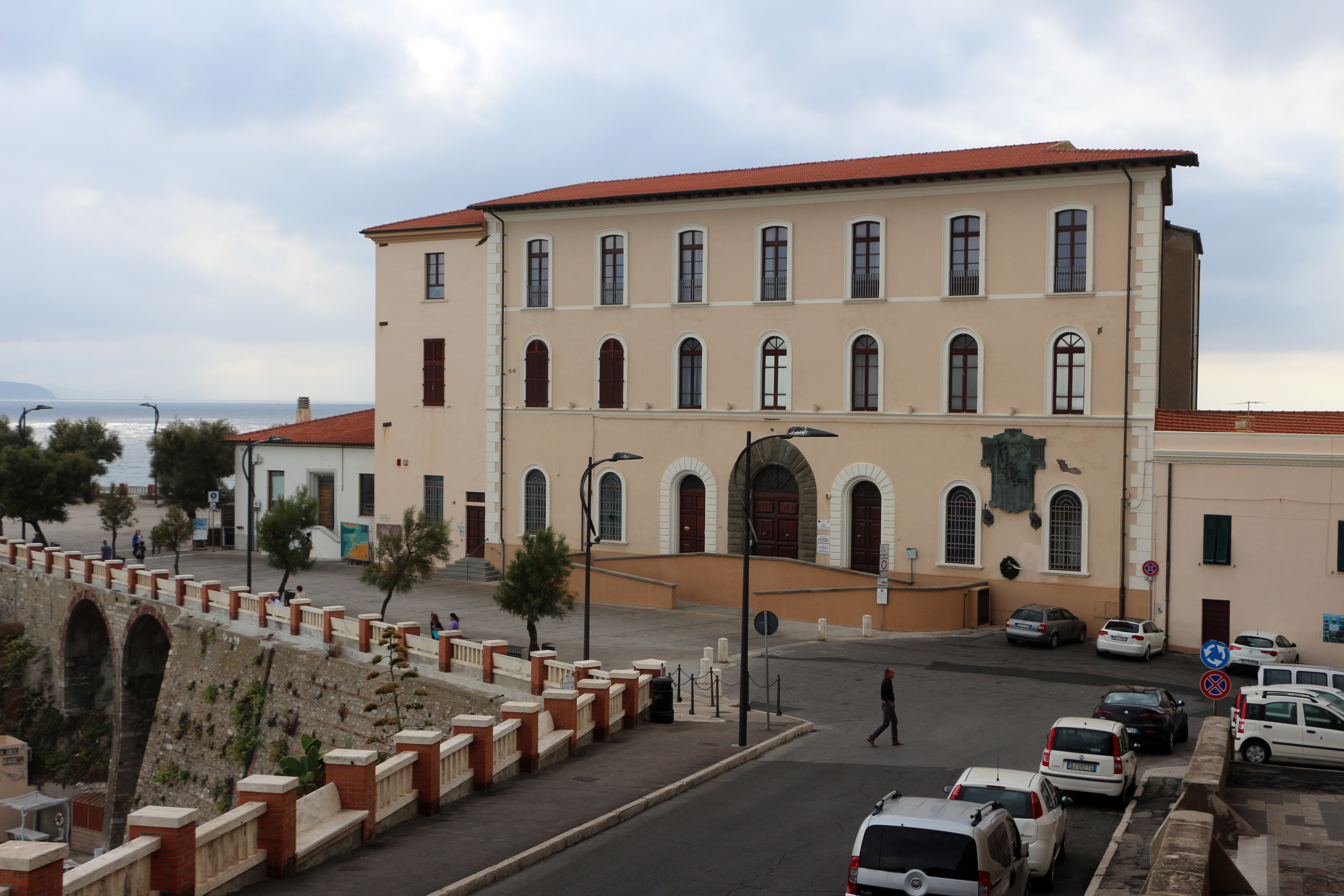
Residence of the lords from 1399 to 1465,

Iacopo III was succeeded by his son Iacopo IV who, between 1501 and 1503, lost the lordship to the work of Cesare Borgia, who occupied Piombino. In 1502, Cesare's father Pope Alexander VI visited the city and the territory staying for some days.

With the death of Pope Alexander VI, Cesare Borgia was deprived of the power he obtained, and Piombino returned to Iacopo IV: the latter, advised by the Florentines, hosted Niccolò Machiavelli as an adviser, who invited Leonardo da Vinci to study the city defences.

Iacopo IV was succeeded by Iacopo V, who welcomed famous artists into his court, such as Il Sodoma and Rosso Fiorentino. On his death, he was succeeded by Iacopo VI, under the tutelage of his mother Elena Salviati.

In 1548, Iacopo VI was deposed as Lord of Piombino, which was incorporated into the territories of the House of Medici. On 29 May 1557, King Philip II of Spain signed a treaty in London with Iacopo VI being restored to the Lordship of Piombino as part of a bargain in which Cosimo I de' Medici, Duke of the Florentine Republic, gave up his claims to Piombino, in exchange for Siena and Portoferraio. King Philip reserved the right to garrison the cities of Piombino and Scarlino and to fortify the island of Elba.

Iacopo VI was succeeded by his natural son Alessandro Appiani. Alessandro attracted the disapproval of the most influential families on the island, who conspired against him and successfully assassinated him in an ambush in via Malpertugio in 1590. After the death of Alessandro, Spanish military commander Felix d'Aragona was invited to govern Piombino in the name of Alessandro's heir Iacopo VII Appiani.

=== Elevation to Principality and fall of the Appiani (1594–1634) ===
In 1594, the Lordship of Piombino was raised to the status of principality by Rudolf II, Holy Roman Emperor with Iacopo VII becoming the first Prince of Piombino.

The succession to the principality was disputed between relatives of the childless Iacopo VII after his death in 1603, with the sister of Iacopo VII, Isabella Appiani, eventually prevailing. In 1628, Isabella was deposed by a revolt fueled by both Spain and the Medici and Piombino was directly occupied by the Spanish.

=== Later history ===
Boncompagni's coat of arms

In 1634, despite the protests of the Appiani cadet line, Piombino was assigned to Prince Niccolò Ludovisi, son-in-law of Isabella Appiani: these and his heirs, politically linked to Philip IV of Spain, paid little attention to the principality which, from 1646 to 1650, was even occupied by the French by order of Cardinal Mazarin.

In 1708, due to the extinction of the Ludovisi family, the government of Piombino was assumed by the Boncompagni family: it was the period of the Boncompagni-Ludovisi, who neglected the state, leaving it to be conquered, in the years of the wars of succession, by the French, Spaniards and Neapolitans. The princes, who were also Dukes of Sora and Arce and Grandee of Spain, resided in Rome or in Isola del Liri and rarely visited the principality. After the Treaty of Aix-la-Chapelle, the situation calmed down and the princes, given their remoteness, left the local magistrates, primarily the Council of the Elders, to administer the state in their name.

From 1799 the French invasions resumed (which formed a short republic), but the English and the Neapolitans kept the island of Elba. After the Battle of Marengo and the defeat of the Kingdom of Naples, the Napoleonic troops annexed Piombino to France. At the behest of Napoleon I, on 23 June 1805, the Principality of Lucca and Piombino was created, assigned to his sister Elisa Bonaparte and her husband Felice Pasquale Baciocchi.

The princely title was restored in 1815 for Boncompagni family, but without a sovereign State. In 1928-1935 Prince Francesco Boncompagni Ludovisi was Governor of Rome.

== List of rulers ==
Coat of arms of the Appiani family, the founders and longest rulers of the Principality.

Variant of the Appiano coat of arms used by Iacopo III his successors as descendants of Alfonso I of Naples

- Iacopo I
- Gherardo 1399–1404
- Iacopo II 1404–41
- Paola (♀) 1441–45
- Rinaldo 1445–50
- Caterina (♀) 1445–51
- Emanuele 1451–57
- Iacopo III 1457–74
- Iacopo IV 1474–1511
- Iacopo V 1511–45
- Iacopo VI 1545–85
- Alessandro 1585–89
- Iacopo VII 1589–1603 (prince under Naples after 1594)
- Rudolf 1603–11
- Isabella (♀) 1611–28
- direct Spanish rule 1628–34
- Niccolò I 1634–64
- Giovan Battista 1664–99
- Niccolò II 1699–1700, under the regency of his mother Anna Maria Arduino, died aged one.
- Olimpia (♀) 1700
- Ippolita (♀) 1701–33, with Gregorio as co-regent (1701–07)
- Eleonora (♀) 1733–45
- Gaetano 1745–77
- Antonio 1778–1803, deposed by French troops in 1799 and 1803
- annexed by French-controlled Lucca 1805–14
- Luigi I Boncompagni-Ludovisi 1814–15
