= Paola Colonna =

Paola Colonna (c. 1378 – 3 November 1450) was the lady of Piombino from 1441 until 1445.

She was born in Genazzano as the daughter of Agapito Colonna, Lord of Genazzano, Capranica Prenestina, San Vito and Ciciliano from 1374, who died after 23 May 1398, and wife Caterina Conti. Her brother Giordano, Lord of Genazzano, Capranica Prenestina, San Vito and Ciciliano, a Neapolitan General, Patrician of Naples in 1417, was shortly Prince of Salerno and Duke of Venosa from 3 August 1419, dying of plague on 16 August 1422, having married Mascia Annibaldi, who died in 1423, without issue, while her brother Oddone would become Pope Martin V. On 18 June 1396 in Rome, she was married to Gherardo Appiani, Lord of Piombino. At his death, she held the regency for their son Iacopo. When the latter also died, she left the principate, against the legitimate heir Emanuele Appiani, to her daughter Caterina, married to the condottiero Rinaldo Orsini.

She died in Piombino in 1450.

== See also ==
- Colonna family

Preceded by Iacopo II Appiani	Lady of Piombino; 1441–1445	Succeeded by Caterina Appiani and Rinaldo Orsini
