= Montecristo =

Island in the Tyrrhenian Sea

Coordinates: 42°20′N 10°19′E

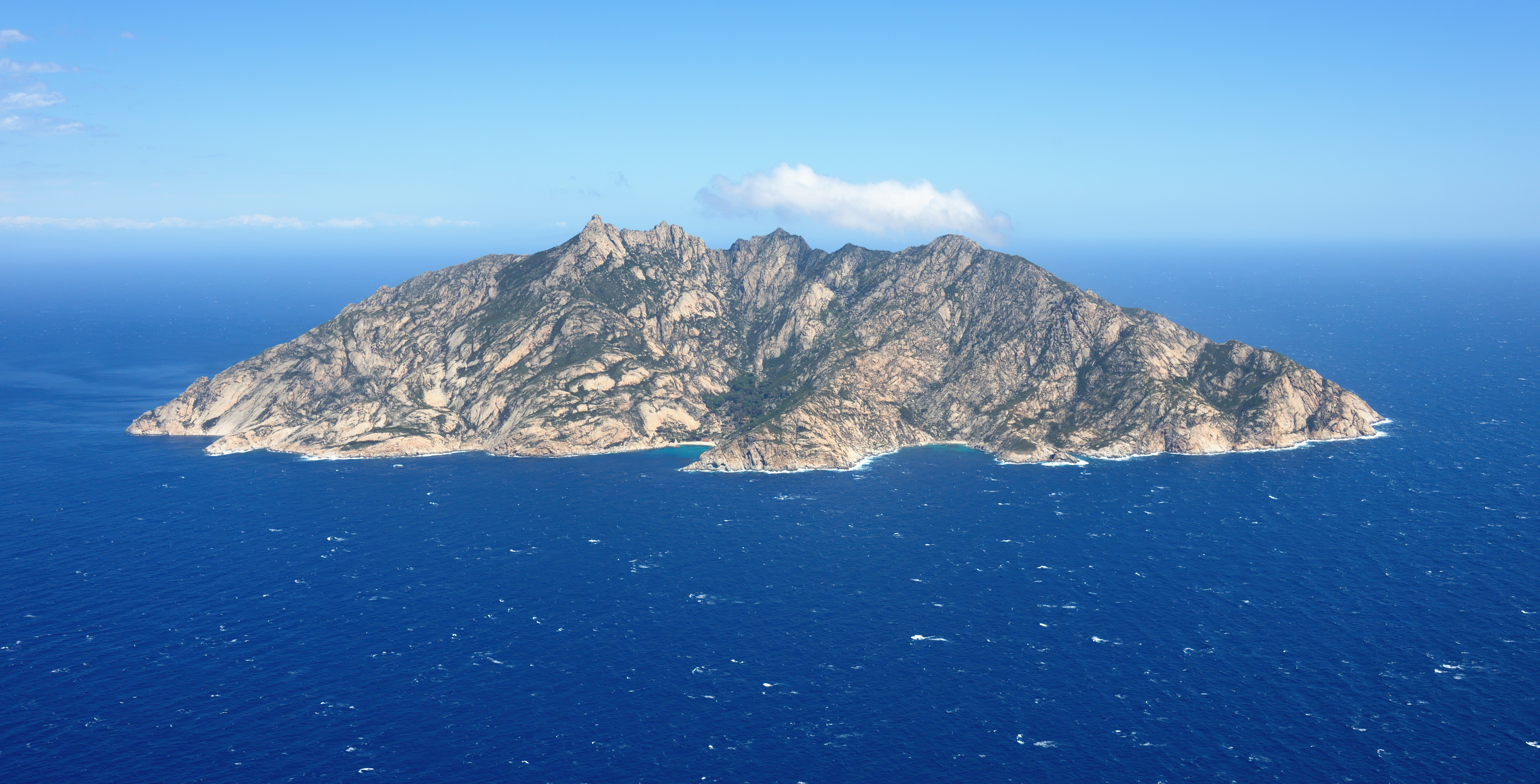

- Location within Tuscany

Geography
- Location: Tyrrhenian Sea
- Archipelago: Tuscan Archipelago
- Area: 10.39 km^{2} (4.01 sq mi)
- Length: 4.1 km (2.55 mi)
- Width: 3.4 km (2.11 mi)
- Coastline: 17 km (10.6 mi)
- Highest elevation: 645 m (2116 ft)
- Highest point: Mount Fortezza

Administration
- Italy
- Region: Tuscany
- Province: Livorno

Demographics
- Population: 2
- Pop. density: 0.15/km^{2} (0.39/sq mi)

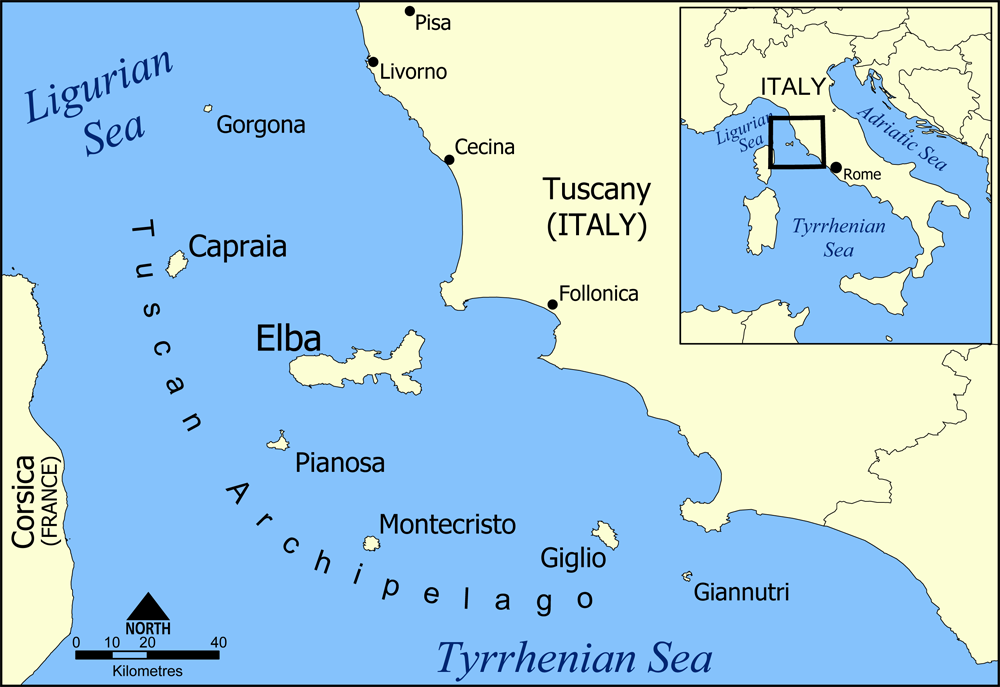
Montecristo and close islands

Montecristo, also Monte Cristo (/ˌmɒntiˈkrɪstoʊ/, Italian: [ˌmonteˈkristo]) and formerly Oglasa (Ancient Greek: Ὠγλάσσα, romanized: Ōglássa), is an island in the Tyrrhenian Sea and part of the Tuscan Archipelago. Administratively it belongs to the municipality of Portoferraio in the province of Livorno, Italy. The island has an area of 10.39 km^{2} (4.01 sq mi), is approximately 4.1 km (2.5 mi) wide at its widest point, and is 3.4 km (2.1 mi) long; the coasts are steep, and extend for 16 km (9.9 mi). The island is a state nature reserve and forms part of the Tuscan Archipelago National Park.

Much of the island's fame is derived from the fact that it provides the title of the 1844 novel The Count of Monte Cristo, by Alexandre Dumas, and is one of the novel's settings.

== History ==
The history of the island begins with the Iron Age. The Etruscans exploited the forests of oak needed to fuel the bloomeries of the mainland where the iron ore of Elba's mines was melted. The Greeks gave Montecristo its oldest known name, Oglasa or Ocrasia, after the yellowish colour of the rocks. The Romans, however, knew it under the name Mons Jovis ("Mount Jupiter"), and erected an altar to Iuppiter Optimus Maximus on the highest mountain, of which some traces remain. During the imperial age, the Romans opened some quarries to extract granite, perhaps used in the construction of villas on the islands of Giglio, Elba, and Giannutri.

Around the middle of the fifth century AD, the caves of the island became home to several hermits escaping from the Vandals of Genseric, the most important of whom was St. Mamilian. They christened the island Mons Christi ("Mountain of Christ"), from which the modern name is derived.

At the beginning of the seventh century, Pope Gregory the Great submitted them to the monastic rule of the Benedictines. In this period, the Monastery of St. Mamilian was founded; as a result of donations to the Church, its wealth became legendary, and a chapel was built in the St. Mamiliano Cave where the saint had lived in the fifth century. In 1216, the monks joined the order of the Camaldolese. Thanks to the donations of several noble families, the monastery became powerful and rich, and this gave rise to the legend of treasure hidden on the island.

The island was once a possession of the Republic of Pisa, but was later acquired by the Principality of Piombino. In 1553, Ottoman pirate Dragut, heading for Elba, stormed the monastery, enslaved the monks, and decreed its end. After that, the island was uninhabited. In the second half of the sixteenth century, together with most of the Tuscan Archipelago, it became part of the Stato dei Presidi, a client Spanish state.

The island was annexed to the French Empire under Napoleon; after his fall, it became the possession of the Grand Duchy of Tuscany. The first attempts to colonise Monte Cristo, at the time owned by Charles Cambiagi, were made in 1840 by two German hermits, Augustin Eulhardt and Joseph Keim, who eventually abandoned the attempt. In 1843, other people arrived with the intention of cultivating the island: young Tyrolean Adolph Franz Obermüller, and after a few months, Frenchman Charles Legrand and his girlfriend. Also during 1843, there were other attempts of colonisation by French agriculturalist George Guiboud, which ended with yet another failure. In 1846, some Genoese made a similar effort, while in 1849 Frenchman Jacques Abrial was able to farm the island for three years. In 1852, a rich Englishman named George Graeme Watson-Taylor bought Montecristo and transformed Cala Maestra into a garden, planting eucalyptus and many exotic plants, among them the Asiatic Ailanthus altissima, an invasive species which now infests the island. The few modern buildings of Montecristo, such as the Royal Villa, date from this period. The island was then purchased by the Italian government on 3 June 1869 for the sum of £100,000. Montecristo had previously been plundered in 1860 by Italian exiles living in London, who had come to Italy to join up with the Camicie rosse, but were shipwrecked on the island. Faced with the huge sum of money claimed by the owner to repair the damage, the government thought it better to buy the island, which was still uninhabited.

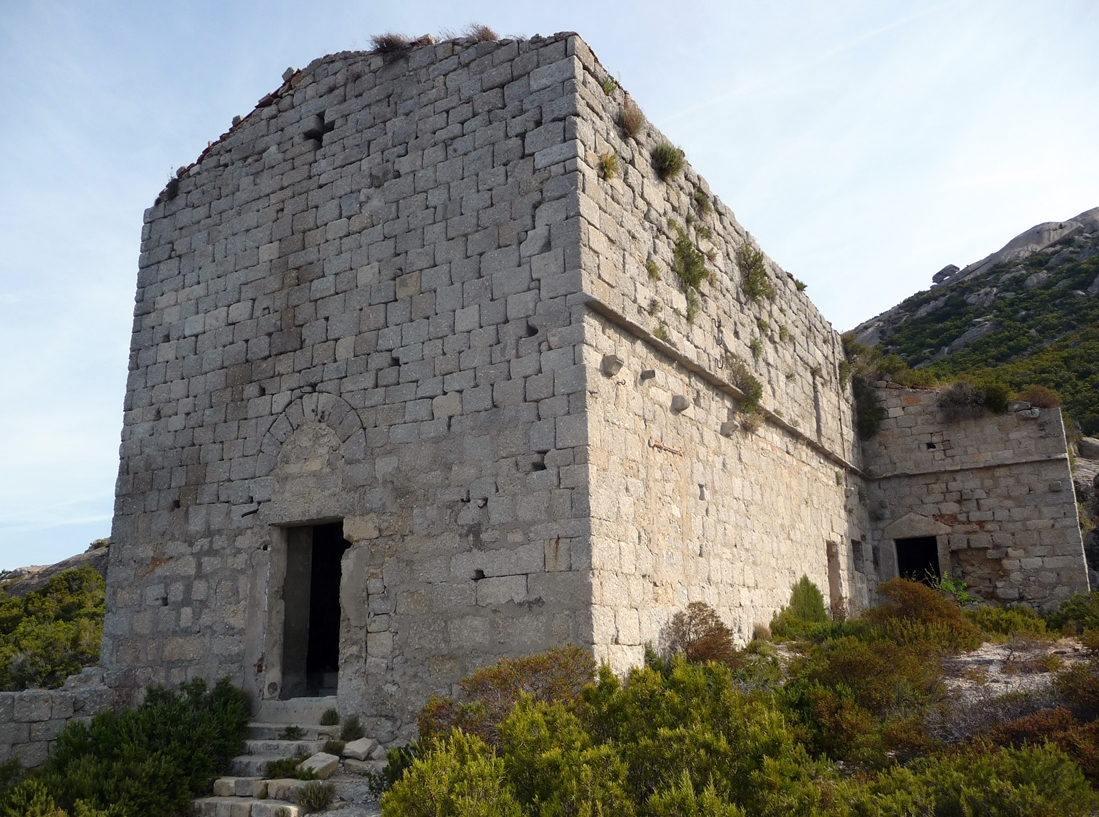
Ruins of the Monastery of San Mamiliano

After other attempts at colonisation in 1878, the Italian government founded a penal colony there, a branch of that in Pianosa.

In 1889, Montecristo was given to Marquess Carlo Ginori, who restored the Villa and transformed the island into a hunting ground.

In 1896, Montecristo was the honeymoon destination of Victor Emmanuel III of Savoy (at that time crown prince) and Elena of Montenegro, and after 1899 it became a royal hunting ground for Victor Emmanuel's exclusive use.

During the Second World War the island, important because of its position between Italy and occupied Corsica, was garrisoned by the Italian army.

In the late 1940s, the Italian Navy Intelligence Agency temporarily took over the island for use as a training base for covert agents. Among Italian officers assigned as instructors were Count Marco deCarrobio and Luigi Ferri. The would-be agents belonged to a right wing Albanian expatriate organization known as the Bloku Kombetar Independent led by activist Alush Leshanaku, according to Shyqri Bicaku, an Elbasan native, who underwent training; Bicaku was also taught to use a field radio and became so proficient he was hired on to instruct secret agents from Romania to use the radio for their October, 1951 covert parachute drop into Romania's mountains; the Romanians were captured, tried and executed.

Montecristo was used as a Navy training base only from September to November 1948, when the trainees were transferred to Italy's west coast. Four of the trained agents were parachuted into Albania in February, 1949, but soon quit their mission and escaped to Greece due to a failed field radio.

After several episodes of vandalism and speculation attempts, the nature reserve was established in 1971.

In December 2011 it was reported that black rats, present on the island at least since Roman times, have greatly increased in numbers and pose a serious threat to the birds of Montecristo. Due to the inaccessibility of the terrain, the island was bombed from the air with poison pellets, as had recently been attempted on Giannutri and Sardinia, despite concerns raised by environmental groups that indigenous species of wildlife and the surrounding waters might also be adversely affected. The Ailanthus trees were also to be eradicated.

== Geography and climate ==
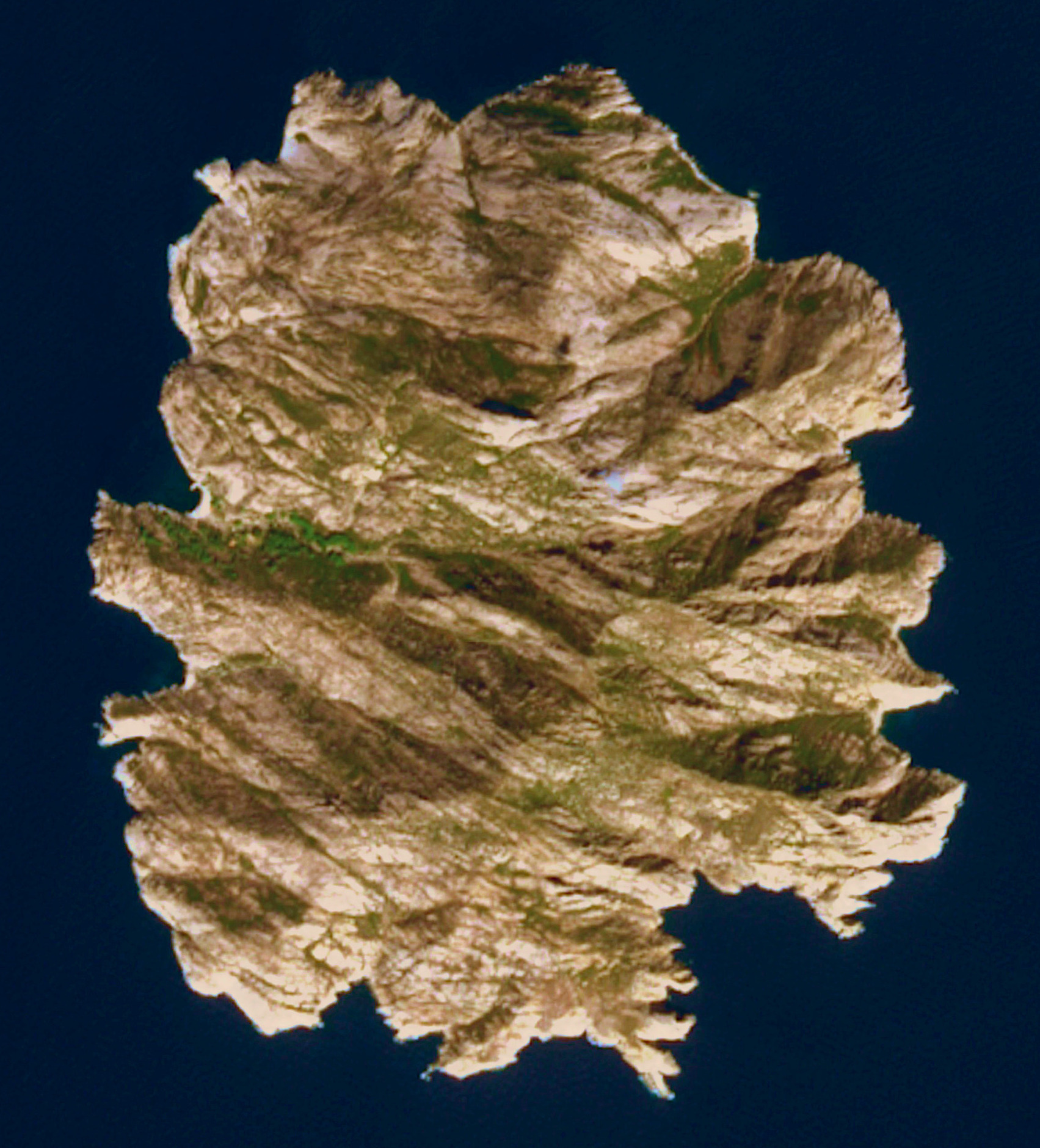
A satellite picture of the island

Montecristo is located in the Tyrrhenian Sea east of Corsica, south of Elba, west of the island of Giglio and the Monte Argentario peninsula, southeast of the island of Pianosa and east of the Scoglio d'Africa rock, also known as Formica di Montecristo.

The island, formed by the heaving of a submarine pluton, has a slightly elliptical shape, and is wholly mountainous, with several rock ledges rising steeply from the sea. It consists almost entirely of granodiorite with large crystals of orthoclase. The mountain chain that crosses the island has three main peaks: Monte della Fortezza (645 m), Cima del Colle Fondo (621 m) and Cima dei Lecci (563 m). Montecristo's only natural harbour is Cala Maestra, on the northwest side. The island has plentiful water resources.

The island of Montecristo, like all the islands of the archipelago, has a mild climate, with a constant sea breeze, much sunshine, and very little rainfall (average annual values much lower than 500 mm (20 in)); the climate is characterised by mild and moderately rainy winters and summers that are hot and dry, but sometimes very muggy.

== Wildlife ==
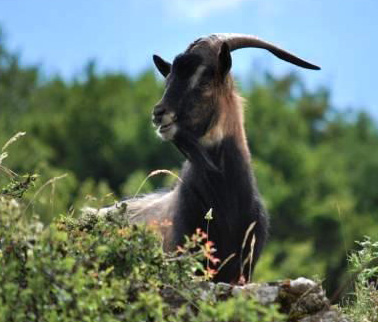
Montecristo's goat (Capra hircus)

The conditions that restricted the establishment of human settlements on Montecristo have favoured the preservation of its flora and fauna. Animals and plants once found throughout the Mediterranean still live on the island. Of particular interest are the giant heather formations covering the valley floors and several thousand-year-old oaks that manage to survive at the highest altitudes. Also interesting are the Montecristo viper (Vipera aspis hugyi, a subspecies also present in southern Italy, and today considered introduced by humans) and Discoglossus sardus, an amphibian found only in a couple of islands in Tuscany and Sardinia. An endemic subspecies of lizard, Podarcis muralis calabresiae, thrives on the island. Montecristo is also a resting place for thousands of migratory birds and is home to large colonies of seabirds (particularly relevant the yelkouan shearwater, as of 2012 critically endangered on the island). The island also hosts the only Italian population of wild goats. The sea environment is quite rich: there are seagrass meadows, sea anemones, sea fans, corals and moonfishes. Until the 1970s the Mediterranean monk seal was also to be found, a critically endangered species that has become extremely rare in Italian waters. Endemic species include the plant Limonium Montis-christi, the invertebrate Oxychilus oglasicola (snail of Monte Cristo), also present on the islet of Scola, near Pianosa, and the reptile Podarcis muralis calabresiae.

=== Island of Montecristo nature reserve ===
Nowadays the island has only two permanent human inhabitants, both nature reserve keepers. In addition, agents of the State Forestry Corps from Follonica live there in alternating shifts of two weeks at a time. The state nature reserve Isola di Monte Cristo is a biogenetic reserve of 1,039 hectares established in 1971 by ministerial decree to protect the unique nature of the island. Today it belongs to the Tuscan Archipelago National Park. It was also awarded the European Diploma of Protected Areas in 1988, and recognized as a site of pan-European interest.

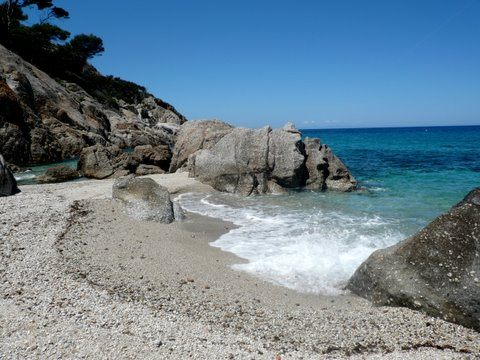
The beach of Cala Maestra

Visitors face a number of restrictions. It is not possible to stay overnight, and swimming, and surfing are prohibited within 1 kilometer of the coast. It is possible to cruise within three miles (4.8 km) of the coast, but fishing is not allowed. Access by sea is possible only at Cala Maestra (where the seabed is sandy) and with an approach course perpendicular to the coast; it is possible to dock at the pier or tie up against a buoy, but dropping anchor is not allowed; there is also a small heliport for emergencies. To visit the island, one must apply for access at the Forestry Corps in Follonica.

Visitors with basic authorization must stay at Cala Maestra, and can visit only the Royal Villa, the botanical garden, and the museum. The waiting list for access is long, since the limit for visitors has been set at only 1,000 per year. The average waiting time for approval to visit is three years, and priority is given to scientific expeditions, associations, and schools. Tours take place only on three existing trails, all of which are very challenging.

== Landmarks ==
- Monastery of St. Mamiliano
- Cave of St. Mamiliano
- Fortress of Monte Cristo on the island's highest peak (645 m)
- Royal Villa
- Natural History Museum
- Botanical Garden
- Mill at the Grotto of St. Mamiliano (ruins)
- Chapel of Santa Maria at the Cala di Santa Maria (ruins)

== See also ==
- List of islands of Italy
- Introduced mammals on seabird breeding islands
- The Count Of Monte Cristo
