= Rinaldo Orsini (condottiero) =

Italian condottiero

Rinaldo Orsini (died 1450) was an Italian condottiero, a member of the Orsini family.

He was the son of Jacopo Orsini. In 1426 he fought for the Pope against the Colonna family. In 1442 he was hired by the Republic of Siena, and in 1445 he became lord of Piombino and Isola d'Elba through his marriage with Caterina Appiani. In 1447, attacked by Alfonso V of Aragon, King of Naples, he defended it with the help of a Florentine army. He was therefore named captain of the Republic of Florence and, in 1450, moved against Alfonso's troops which were besieging Castiglione della Pescaia, but without effect. He died the same year by plague.

== Bibliography ==
- Sansovino, F. (1565). Historia di Casa Orsini. Venice.

Preceded by Paola Appiani Colonna	Lord of Piombino; 1445–1450	Succeeded by Caterina Appiani
