= Gherardo Appiani =

Gherardo Appiani (c. 1370 – May 1405) was the lord of Piombino from 1398 until his death. He was a member of the Appiani family.

He was born in Pisa, the son of Iacopo I Appiani. He was lord of that city from 1398 until 1399, obtaining the lordship of Piombino in 1398 in exchange for Pisa, sold to Gian Galeazzo Visconti for 200,000 florins. In 1396 he married Paola Colonna, daughter of Agapito Colonna, and sister of future Pope Martin V.

He died in 1405, succeeded in Piombino by his son Iacopo.

Preceded by Iacopo I Appiani	Lord of Piombino; 1398–1405	Succeeded by Iacopo II Appiani
