= Iacopo II Appiani =

Lord of Piombino

Iacopo II Appiani (c. 1400 – 27 December 1441) was the lord of Piombino from 1411 until 1427.

He was born in Piombino, the son of Gherardo Appiano, whom he succeeded in 1405, remaining under the regency of his mother Paola Colonna until coming of age. He was known for switching his alliances from the Republic of Florence to that of Siena, and then moving again to the former. He strengthened his position by marrying Donella Fieschi, daughter of the powerful Genoese patrician and Florentine commander Gian Luigi Fieschi.

Iacopo died childless in 1427 and was succeeded by his mother.

Preceded by Gherardo Appiani	Lord of Piombino; 1405–1441	Succeeded by Paola Colonna
