= Suvereto =

- Comune
- Comune di Suvereto
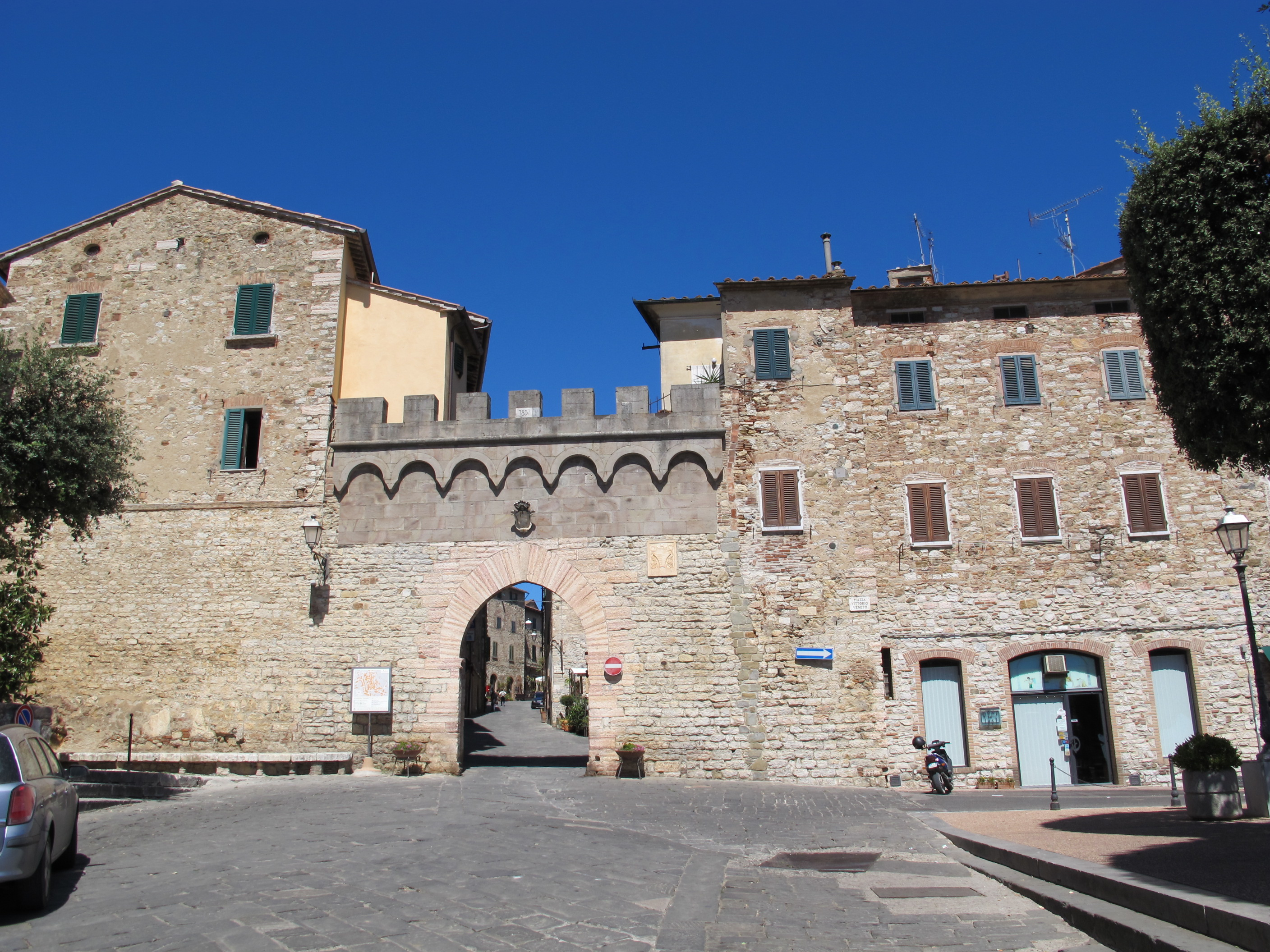
- South gate of Suvereto

- Location within Italy Location within Tuscany
- Coordinates: 43°5′N 10°41′E
- Country: Italy
- Region: Tuscany
- Province: Livorno (LI)
- Frazioni: Belvedere, Montioni, Prata, San Lorenzo

Government
  - Mayor: Jessica Pasquini

Area
  - Total: 92.9 km^{2} (35.9 sq mi)
- Elevation: 90 m (300 ft)

Population (January 2017)
  - Total: 3,035
  - Density: 32.7/km^{2} (84.6/sq mi)
- Demonym: Suveretani
- Time zone: UTC+1 (CET)
  - Summer (DST): UTC+2 (CEST)
- Postal code: 57028
- Dialing code: 0565
- Patron saint: Santa Croce
- Saint day: May 3
- Website: Official website

Suvereto (Italian pronunciation: [suveˈreːto]) is a comune (municipality) in the Province of Livorno in the Italian region Tuscany, located about 90 km (56 miles) southwest of Florence and about 60 km (37 miles) southeast of Livorno. It is one of I Borghi più belli d'Italia ("The most beautiful villages of Italy").

== Government ==
Frazioni

The municipality is formed by the municipal seat of Suvereto and the villages (frazioni) of Belvedere, Montioni, Prata and San Lorenzo. The small hamlets of Forni, Poggio al Turco, San Lorenzo Due, Tabarò and Valdamone are also included in the municipality.

== Main sights ==
- Rocca Aldobrandesca, ruins of a castle built in the mid-12th century near 9th century fortifications.
- Pieve of San Giusto, a pleban church in Romanesque style
- Countryside church of Santissima Annunziata
- Church of the Crucifix
- Natural Park of Montioni

== Infrastructure ==
- Static inverter plant of HVDC SACOI, the HVDC-power cable connecting the power grids of Corse and Sardinia with the grid of the Italian mainland.
- Research centre for switchyards of ENEL, including an experimental 3-kilometre (2-mile) long powerline to Valdicciola, which is partly built as underground cable
