= Palazzo Guelfi =

Historic building in Tuscany, Italy

- Interactive map of the Palazzo Guelfi area

General information
- Location: Strada provinciale 152 Aurelia Vecchia, Scarlino Scalo; Scarlino, Province of Grosseto, Tuscany, Italy
- Coordinates: 42°56′30.6″N 10°49′5.9″E
- Completed: 1834

Palazzo Guelfi is a 19th-century rural villa near Scarlino Scalo, in the province of Grosseto, Tuscany, Italy. Originally built as the centre of an agricultural estate in the Maremma, it is best known for having sheltered Giuseppe Garibaldi during his escape through Tuscany in 1849 following the death of Anita. Owing to its association with the Italian Risorgimento, the villa was declared a national monument in 1942. Despite this protected status, the building fell into neglect during the early 21st century and was stripped by the heirs of most of its original furnishings and memorabilia.

== History ==
The site is documented in the 1822 Tuscan cadastre as a "uncultivated working field" owned by Domenico Guelfi, a member of the local bourgeoisie who accumulated wealth through the acquisition of former state-owned lands sold in the early 19th century by the Principality of Piombino.

By 1829, sources refer to the "Pecora Vecchia" complex, which consisted of a villa under construction, a hut, and a well. The building originally took its name from the nearby Pecora River, which had been diverted south of the estate to channel sediments into the Scarlino Marsh in an attempt at land reclamation. In 1830, a salt and tobacco retail point was established at the river mouth under Giuseppe Guelfi, son of Domenico. During a visit to the Maremma in 1832, Grand Duke Leopold II of Tuscany described the site as the "beautiful house of Guelfi", still under construction, and confirmed its completion two years later.

The villa later became historically significant for its role in the escape of Giuseppe Garibaldi in 1849 following the death of his wife Anita. Angiolo Guelfi (1803–1865), another son of Domenico and former captain of the disbanded National Guard, hosted Garibaldi during the night of 1–2 September before assisting his escape towards the coast at Cala Martina. A planning meeting for the escape through the Bandite di Scarlino took place in the villa's first-floor salon, and Garibaldi, together with Giovanni Battista Culiolo (known as "Leggero"), rested in the main bedroom. The event is commemorated by a plaque placed in 1862 by Guelfi himself, later followed by additional plaques installed in 1882 and 1949.

On 22 October 1942, the building was declared a national monument by decree of King Victor Emmanuel III, signed by Minister Giuseppe Bottai. Despite the monument protection status, the palace underwent gradual deterioration during the post-war decades.

During World War II, some of the relics preserved in the building, including a half-smoked Tuscan cigar traditionally attributed to Garibaldi, disappeared. The object may have been taken either by retreating German troops or by Allied soldiers who occupied the area in the final stages of the conflict.

For much of the post-war period the historical furnishings and memorabilia connected with Garibaldi's stay were preserved through the efforts of Luigi Socini Guelfi, the last descendant of the family who took care of the palace and maintained its collection largely intact. The building still contained numerous original or traditionally attributed objects in the early 2000s, including the canopy bed used by Garibaldi, mirrors, furniture, photographs and commemorative artefacts related to the Risorgimento.

Following the death of Socini Guelfi in 2008, the building was progressively stripped of many of its furnishings and artefacts. The heirs showed no interest in continuing the preservation work carried out by Socini Guelfi, and several historically significant objects subsequently disappeared from the building. Between 2011 and 2018 reports documented the loss of furniture, busts, archival material and other memorabilia associated with Garibaldi's passage. In 2018, the palace was described as being in a state of neglect despite its formal status as a protected national monument.

== Description ==
Palazzo Guelfi forms part of a wider rural estate enclosed by masonry walls and accessed through a central gate flanked by two concave wings. Around the main residence are several agricultural buildings developed during the 19th century, including the structures known as "Mentana", formerly associated with the estate's irrigation system, and "La Pecora", which originated from an earlier rural hut recorded in 1829. Smaller outbuildings known as "Cala Martina" and "Caprera" are also located within the property.

The villa itself is a three-storey rectangular structure reflecting the sober architectural character of 19th-century Maremma country residences. The main façade is centred on a portal framed by a round arch and topped by a wrought-iron fanlight. Above the entrance is a commemorative plaque installed in 1882 by the municipality of Gavorrano to mark Giuseppe Garibaldi's stay at the villa during his 1849 escape through the Maremma.

The ground floor originally contained service and agricultural functions connected with the management of the estate, while the upper floors were used as residential quarters. The interiors preserve several original architectural elements, including terracotta floors laid in diagonal and herringbone patterns and rooms covered by lowered pavilion vaults. The entrance hall preserves a marble inscription placed in 1949 to commemorate the inauguration of the Garibaldi monument at Cala Martina.

Among the principal rooms is a small salon with a marble fireplace leading to the main bedroom associated with Garibaldi's stay. Decorative painted medallions illustrating stages of Garibaldi's escape route are preserved in this area, together with commemorative inscriptions added in later decades. A further memorial plaque dedicated to Angiolo Guelfi, bearing an inscription by Francesco Domenico Guerrazzi, is located on the first-floor staircase landing. The villa also preserved a number of Risorgimento-related memorabilia, including a dagger reportedly gifted by Garibaldi to Angiolo Guelfi and a red shirt belonging to Guelfo Guelfi, who served among the Hunters of the Alps during the Second Italian War of Independence. The subsequent fate of many of these objects remains unknown, as local historians reported that after the death of Luigi Socini Guelfi in 2008 several furnishings and memorabilia were removed or dispersed by the heirs.

== Sources ==
- Asso, Francesco (2003). Itinerari garibaldini in Toscana e dintorni 1848-1867. Florence.
- Fargnoli, Narcisa (1995). "Il mito dell'eroe: da Garibaldi ai caduti del 1915-18". In Franchina, Letizia (ed.). Tra Ottocento e Novecento. Grosseto e la Maremma alla ricerca di una nuova immagine. Soprintendenza per i beni ambientali e architettonici per le province di Siena e Grosseto.
- Guelfi, Guelfo (1889). Dal Molino di Cerbaia a Cala Martina. Notizie inedite sulla vita di Giuseppe Garibaldi. Florence.
