= Scarlino Scalo =

- Frazione
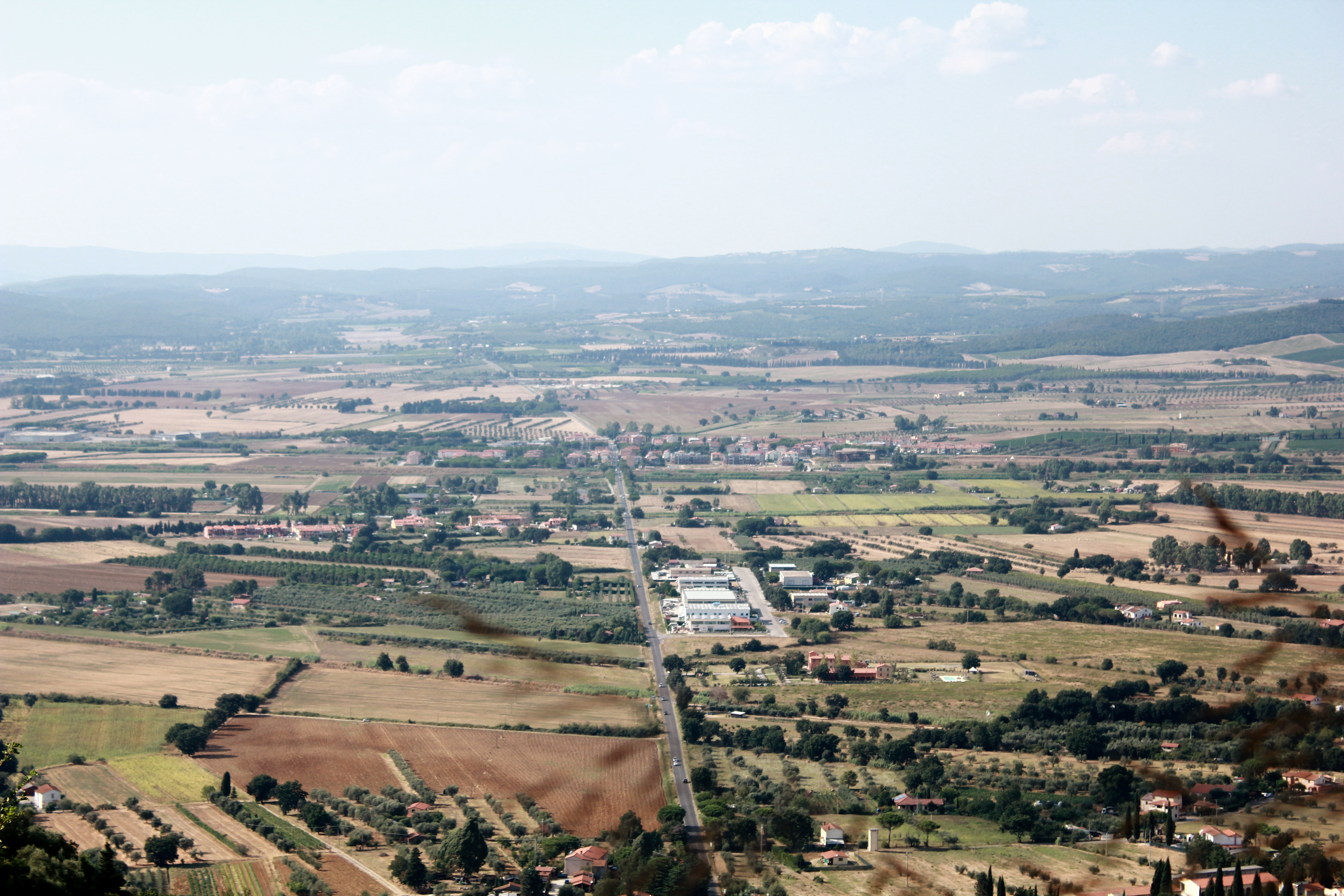
- View of Scarlino Scalo

- Location of Scarlino Scalo in Italy
- Coordinates: 42°56′36″N 10°50′13″E
- Country: Italy
- Region: Tuscany
- Province: Grosseto (GR)
- Comune: Scarlino
- Elevation: 12 m (39 ft)

Population (2011)
  - Total: 1,582
- Demonym: Scarlinesi
- Time zone: UTC+1 (CET)
  - Summer (DST): UTC+2 (CEST)
- Postal code: 58020
- Dialing code: (+39) 0564

Scarlino Scalo is a village in Tuscany, central Italy, a frazione of the municipality of Scarlino in the province of Grosseto. Located in the alluvial plain of the Pecora River at the foot of Monte d'Alma, it lies along the Tyrrhenian corridor near the Strada statale 1 Via Aurelia and the Pisa–Rome railway line. As of the 2001 census, it had a population of 1,230.

The settlement developed in the early 20th century around the railway station opened in 1900, and later became an industrial and logistics centre linked to mining activities in the Colline Metallifere.

== History ==
The area is associated with the passage of Giuseppe Garibaldi. In the summer of 1849, during his escape following the fall of the Roman Republic, Garibaldi took refuge at nearby Palazzo Guelfi, hosted by Angiolo Guelfi. From there, with the help of local patriots, he crossed the surrounding wooded areas of the Bandite di Scarlino and reached the coast at Cala Martina.

The modern settlement developed in the alluvial plain of the Pecora River, at the foot of Monte d'Alma, around the railway station opened in December 1900 to serve the hilltop village of Scarlino. Its growth is closely linked to its role as a transport and industrial hub along the Tyrrhenian corridor.

From the early 20th century, Scarlino Scalo became a major centre for mining logistics in the Colline Metallifere. A large pyrite sorting and dispatch plant was built near the railway station from 1909 onwards, initially as a terminal for ore extracted from Boccheggiano and later expanded to serve additional mines such as Gavorrano and Niccioleta. After a fire in 1926, the complex was rebuilt in reinforced concrete and further expanded in the 1930s. Connected by an extensive network of cableways, it remained the main pyrite distribution centre in southern Maremma until the closure of the mining system in 1968.

== Main sights ==
At the centre of Scarlino Scalo stands the hydraulic control station built in 1905. It is a water management structure designed to regulate and monitor drainage flows in the Pecora plain, as part of the hydraulic works connected with the reclamation and control of formerly marshy areas in the surrounding territory. The building, which shows eclectic architectural features, is currently abandoned.

Palazzo Guelfi is a 19th-century country residence located just outside the settlement along the former Via Aurelia. It is designated as a national monument due to its historical association with Giuseppe Garibaldi, who have stayed at the building during the summer of 1849, hosted by Angiolo Guelfi. The palace preserves historical documents and memorabilia related to this episode.

== Religion ==
The parish church of Scarlino Scalo, dedicated to Our Lady of Graces (Madonna delle Grazie) and located in Via Mariotti, developed from a project initiated after the Montecatini company donated land in 1956. Initial works focused on a nursery school with pastoral functions, opened in 1973. In 1975, Scarlino Scalo became an autonomous parish in the diocese of Grosseto, with civil recognition in 1976. The church was designed in the late 1970s by architect Carlo F. Moni and consecrated on 13 May 1984, taking its dedication from a former local oratory. A new presbytery was added in 2000.

== Education ==
Public educational services in Scarlino Scalo are provided by the "Falcone and Borsellino" Institute of Gavorrano. It operates three public schools in the village: the "Attilio Mariotti" middle school and the "Edmondo De Amicis" elementary school, both located on Via Lelli, and a kindergarten on Via Turati, opposite the local church.

== Transport ==
Scarlino Scalo is served by the Scarlino railway station on the Pisa–Rome railway. Road access is provided by an exit of the Strada statale 1 Via Aurelia.

== See also ==
- Pian d'Alma
- Puntone di Scarlino
