= Sauro Gelichi =

Sauro Gelichi (born 15 April 1954 in Piombino) is a Medieval archaeologist and a professor at Ca' Foscari University of Venice. He has published widely on his subject and supervised various excavations. In 2004 he was appointed Honorary Inspector Archaeologist with expertise on the Middle Ages for the Emilia-Romagna region.
