= Puntone di Scarlino =

Puntone di Scarlino Puntone / Portiglioni
- Frazione
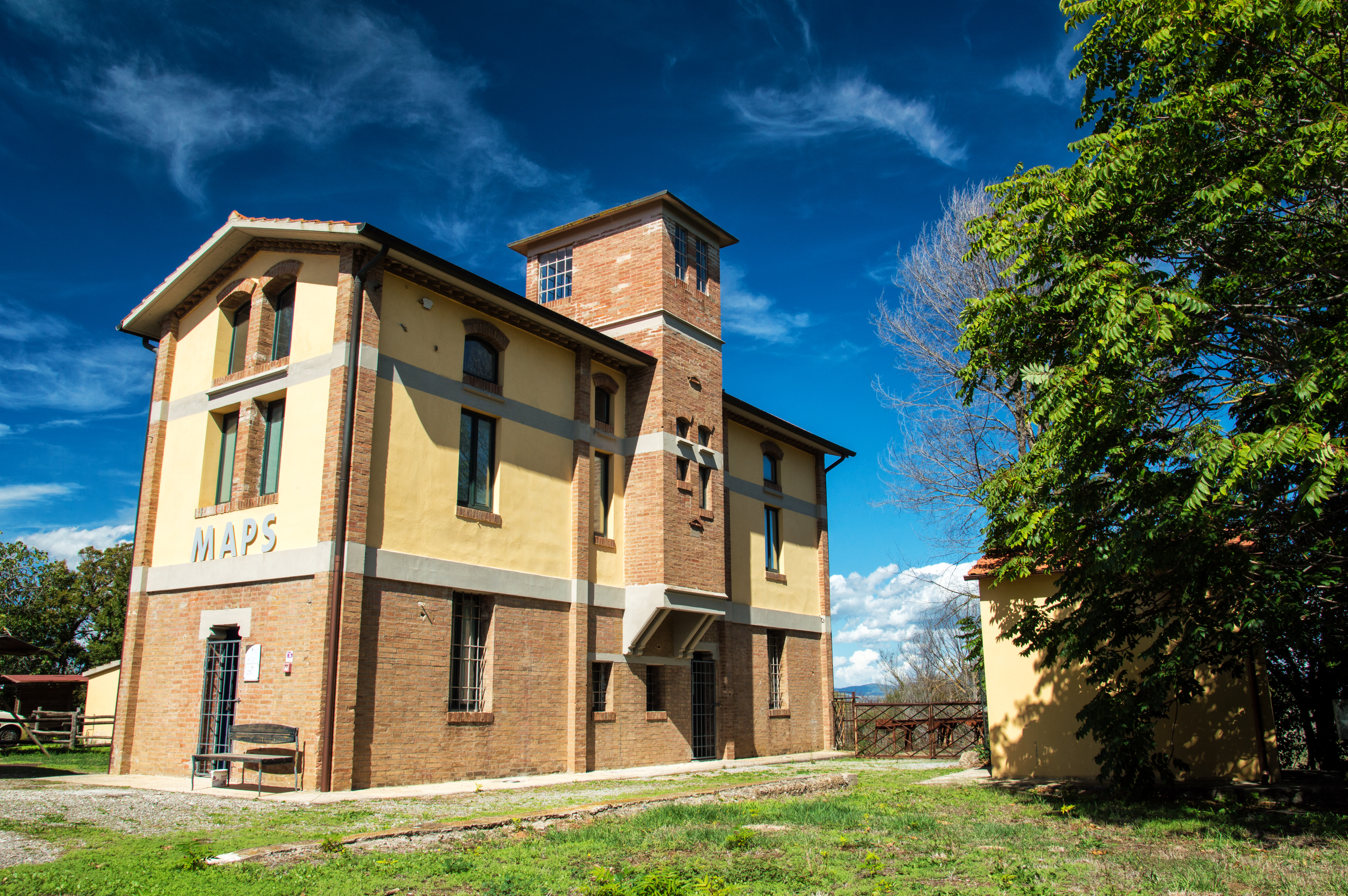
- Portus Scabris Archaeological Museum

- Location of Puntone di Scarlino in Italy
- Coordinates: 42°53′23″N 10°47′27″E
- Country: Italy
- Region: Tuscany
- Province: Grosseto (GR)
- Comune: Scarlino
- Elevation: 4 m (13 ft)

Population (2011)
  - Total: 503
- Demonym: Puntonesi
- Time zone: UTC+1 (CET)
  - Summer (DST): UTC+2 (CEST)
- Postal code: 58020
- Dialing code: (+39) 0564

Puntone di Scarlino is a village in Tuscany, central Italy, administratively a frazione of the municipality of Scarlino in the province of Grosseto. As of the 2001 census, it had a population of 345. It is located on the Tyrrhenian coast within the Gulf of Follonica, approximately 41 km from Grosseto and 8 km from Scarlino. It is a seaside resort known for its marina and coastal tourism.

== Geography ==
Puntone di Scarlino is located along the Tyrrhenian coast, south of the town of Follonica. The settlement developed around the mouth of the Pecora River, where a residual marsh persists, representing one of the last remnants of the former wetland system that once characterised the coastal plain.

To the south of Puntone, beginning at the bay of Portiglioni where the marina is located, the coastline enters the protected landscape of the Bandite di Scarlino. Here the shore becomes predominantly rocky, alternating with small coves such as Cala Le Donne and Cala Terra Rossa. The latter is associated with the former coastal terminal of a mining cableway system that transported ore from inland extraction areas to the coast. Further south, the promontory of Punta Francese separates these inlets from Cala Martina.

== History ==
The area of Puntone di Scarlino was originally part of the ancient Lake of Scarlino, a coastal lagoon that later became marshland. From the 4th century BCE, it hosted an early industrial settlement linked to metallurgy and manufacturing. Between the late 3rd and 2nd centuries BCE, a major coastal harbour developed. It is generally identified with the ancient Portus Scabris mentioned by Livy, which traded iron ore from Elba as well as agricultural goods.

The port expanded during the late Roman Republic , becoming a more structured industrial and service centre with baths, accommodation facilities, and the "Manliana" complex, a roadside station. Although rural decline began in the Imperial period, Portus Scabris remained active into late antiquity and the early Middle Ages. By 1104 it is recorded as Portiglione, associated with a church dedicated to Saint Severo, and later came under Pisan control, as documented in a 1286 statute referring to a paved road crossing the lagoon.

From the 16th century, the area progressively declined due to marsh formation and malaria, although a small harbour remained in use until the 18th century. From the 19th century, reclamation works under the Lorraine administration began to transform the area, followed by 20th-century industrial reuse linked to mining and chemical production.

After the decline of industrial activity in the late 20th century, Puntone developed into a seaside and tourist destination, culminating in the opening of a marina in 2003.

== Main sights ==
=== Archaeological museum ===
The main landmark in Puntone di Scarlino is the Portus Scabris Archaeological Museum (MAPS), opened in 2009. It was established following underwater archaeological excavations carried out between 2000 and 2001 during the construction of the modern marina, which brought to light extensive remains of the ancient harbour. It presents the long history of the site through maps, reconstructions, and artefacts documenting maritime trade from the late 3rd century BCE through the Roman, medieval, and modern periods.

The museum is housed within the historic hydraulic station of Puntone, a set of early 20th-century structures originally built to regulate and monitor the waters of the Scarlino Marsh and the mouth of the Pecora River. The complex included the residence of the lock keeper, whose role was to oversee the hydraulic system and manage water levels between the inland wetlands and the coastal area. Alongside the main building, the site also preserves a restored warehouse and a sluice-bridge structure over the Pecora.

=== Archaeological sites ===
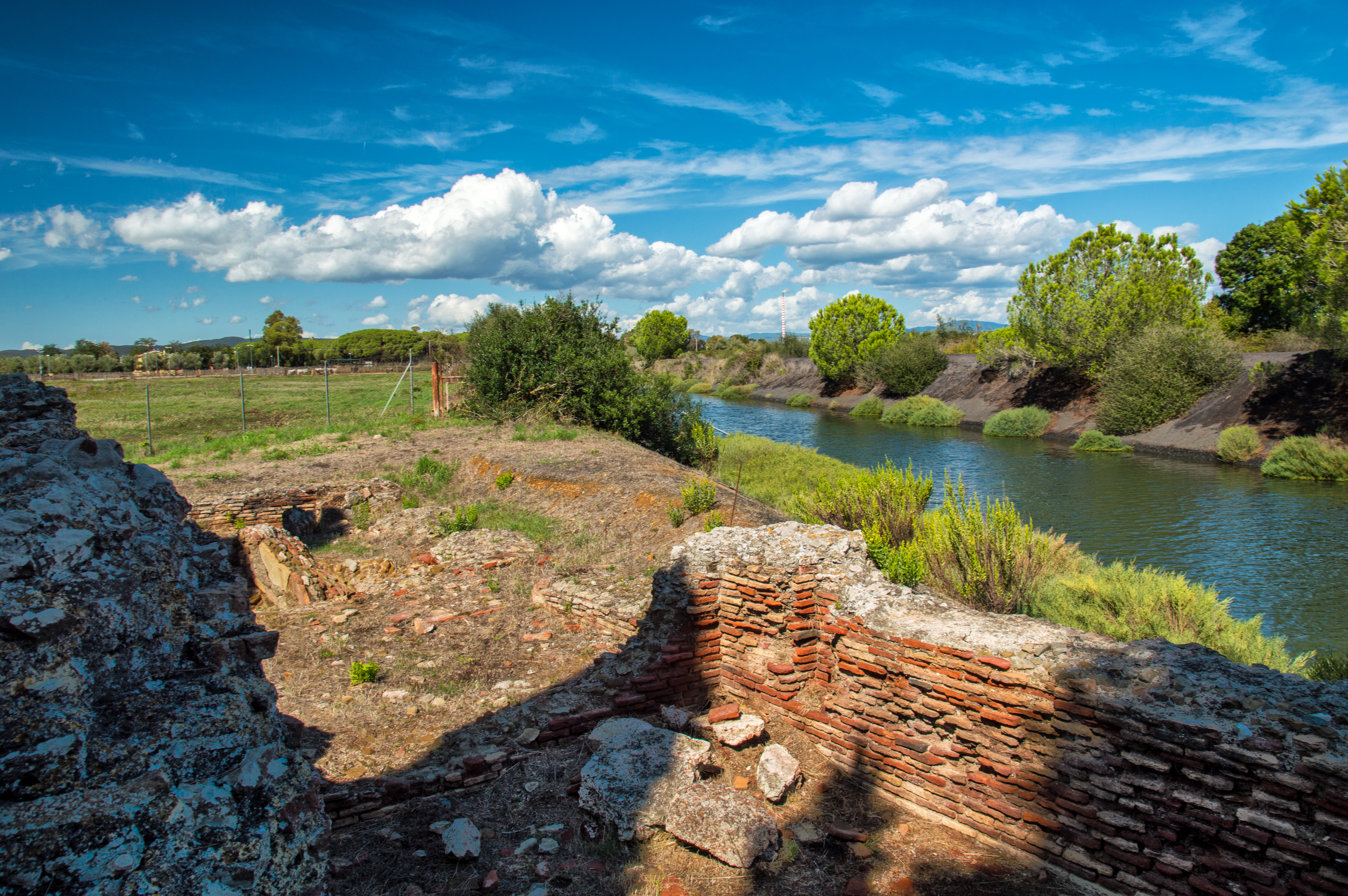
The Roman villa of Puntone Vecchio

Of the medieval religious and defensive structures in the area, no visible remains survive of the church of San Severo, although archaeological traces of masonry and a sacred spring traditionally associated with the saint have been identified nearby. Likewise, the medieval coastal tower of Portiglioni, located at the mouth of the Pecora River, has completely disappeared.

The area also preserves numerous archaeological remains, including a 3rd-century BCE tomb discovered in 1956, a late Bronze Age settlement located about 500 metres from the sea, and the Roman villa of Puntone Vecchio, a classical building dating to the 1st century BCE, likely in use until the first half of the 3rd century CE. The villa was partially damaged during the construction of a canal serving the chemical plant built by the Montecatini company in 1962.

== Transport ==
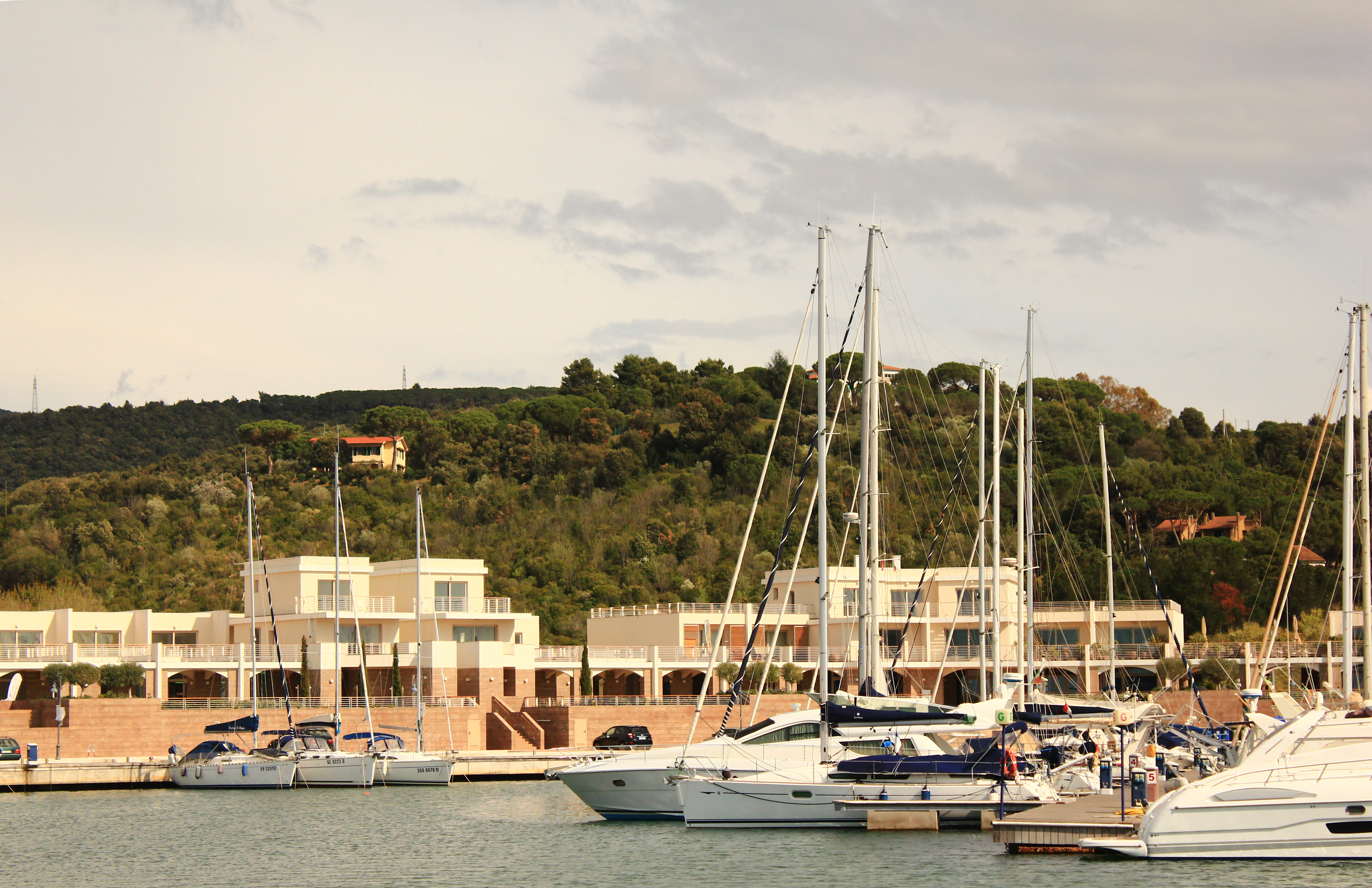
The marina

The village is served by the SP158 Collacchie provincial road, which links Follonica and Grosseto along the Tyrrhenian coast. The SP60 Puntone road also begins in the settlement, connecting it with Scarlino and Bagno di Gavorrano. A coastal cycle path runs to Punta Ala through the Bandite di Scarlino coastal reserve.

The hamlet is also served by the marina, inaugurated in 2003 in the bay of Portiglioni, on the site of the ancient Roman harbour traditionally identified with Portus Scabris. Archaeological finds uncovered during the construction of the modern marina later formed the core collection of the local archaeological museum. The marina provides approximately 970 berths for vessels up to 38 metres in length and includes nautical services, hospitality facilities, and the Club Nautico di Scarlino.

== Sources ==
- Guide d'Italia. Toscana. Milan: Touring Club Italiano. 2012. p. 891.
- Bargagliotti, Sergio (2010). Il Museo Archeologico del Portus Scabris. Puntone, Scarlino, Grosseto. Scarlino.
- Betti Carboncini, Adriano; Grassi, Giancarlo (2011). Casone di Scarlino. Da centro agricolo a polo dell'industria chimica. Follonica: ColorDeSoli.
- Repetti, Emanuele (1841). Dizionario geografico fisico storico della Toscana. Vol. 4. Florence: Allegrini e Mazzoni. p. 592.
- Torelli, Mario (1992). Atlante dei siti archeologici della Toscana. Vol. 2. Rome: «L'Erma» di Bretschneider.

== See also ==
- Bandite di Scarlino
- Cala Martina
- Cala Violina
- Pecora (river)
- Pian d'Alma
- Scarlino Scalo
