= Cala Violina =

Cove in Tuscany, Italy

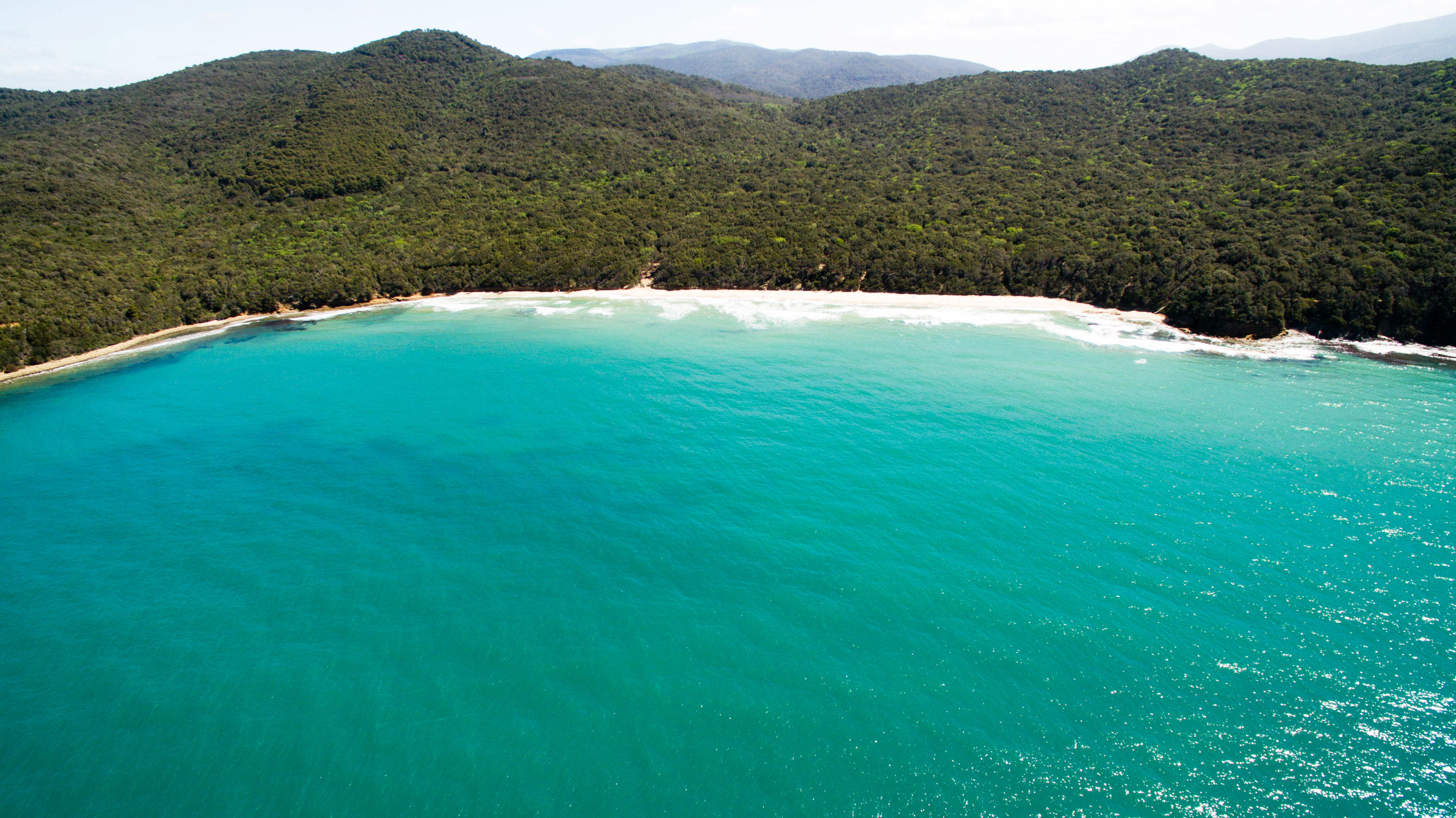
- Interactive map of Cala Violina
- Location: Scarlino, Province of Grosseto, Tuscany
- Type: Inlet
- Part of: Gulf of Follonica, Tyrrhenian Sea
- Basin countries: Italy

Cala Violina is a coastal inlet in the Maremma region of southern Tuscany, Italy, located within the municipality of Scarlino. It opens onto the Tyrrhenian Sea and is part of the protected natural area of the Bandite di Scarlino.

The inlet is enclosed between Punta Martina to the north, which separates it from Cala Martina, and Punta Le Canne to the south, beyond which lies Cala Civette. It features a fine white sandy beach surrounded by Mediterranean woodland. Access is possible on foot via a forest path of approximately 30 minutes.

According to local tradition, the name—meaning "Violin Cove"—derives from the sound produced by footsteps on the sand in the surrounding silence, making it an example of Singing sand.
