= La Rocchetta Lighthouse =

La Rocchetta
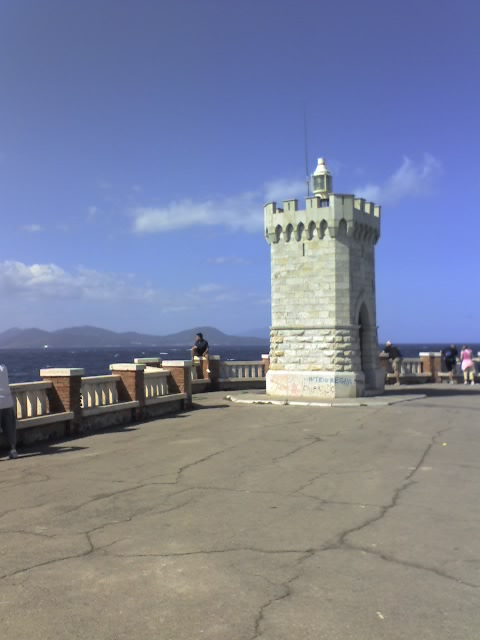
- La Rocchetta Lighthouse
- Location: Piombino; Tuscany; Italy
- Coordinates: 42°55′12″N 10°31′31″E

Tower
- Constructed: 1928
- Foundation: concrete base
- Construction: stone tower
- Height: 5 metres (16 ft)
- Shape: quadrangular tower with balcony and light atop
- Markings: unpainted grey stone castellated tower,
- Power source: mains electricity
- Operator: Marina Militare

Light
- Focal height: 18 metres (59 ft)
- Lens: Type TD 375
- Intensity: MaxiHalo-60
- Range: 11 nautical miles (20 km; 13 mi)
- Characteristic: Fl (3) W 15s.
- Italy no.: 2098 E.F.

La Rocchetta Lighthouse (Italian: Faro de La Rocchetta) is an active lighthouse located on the southern part of the promontory of Piombino overlooking the Piombino Channel which separates the Elba from the mainland.

== Description ==
The lighthouse was built in 1928 on the same place where once was La Rocchetta, one of the four defensive fortifications, then demolished in the 1920s in order to make room for a panoramic town square above the cliff, which were connected to each other by walls that surrounded the city.

The lighthouse consists of a quadrangular grey stone tower in Neo Gothic style, 5 metres (16 ft) high, with castellated balcony and light placed atop. The light is positioned at 18 metres (59 ft) above sea level and emits three white flashes in a 15 seconds period, visible up to a distance of 11 nautical miles (20 km; 13 mi). The lighthouse is completely automated and managed by the Marina Militare with the identification code number 2098 E.F.

== See also ==
- List of lighthouses in Italy
