= Gulf of Follonica =

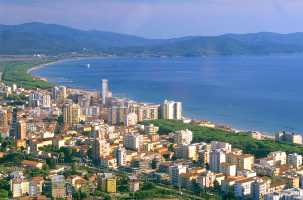
- View of the gulf with the town of Follonica
- Interactive map of Gulf of Follonica
- Location: Province of Grosseto, Tuscany, Italy
- Coordinates: 42°53′45″N 10°39′40″E
- Type: Gulf
- Part of: Tyrrhenian Sea
- Basin countries: Italy
- Settlements: Follonica, Piombino, Punta Ala, Puntone di Scarlino

The Gulf of Follonica is a bay of the Tyrrhenian Sea located along the western coast of Tuscany, Italy. It extends between the northern part of the province of Grosseto and the southern part of the province of Livorno, within the geographical region of the Maremma. The gulf is bounded to the northwest by the promontory of Piombino and to the southeast by the promontory of Punta Ala. Its coastline includes portions of the municipalities of Piombino, Follonica, Scarlino, and Castiglione della Pescaia.

In antiquity, the gulf was known by the Latin name Sinus Plumbini.

== Geography ==
The northwestern sector, within the territory of Piombino, is characterized by port facilities and sandy shores, historically associated with the mouth of the Cornia River. Moving eastward, the coastline forms a wide arc of light-colored sandy beaches, interrupted by the river's estuarine outlet and coastal structures such as Torre Mozza and the small harbour of Carbonifera.

In the province of Grosseto, the coastline becomes more varied. Around Follonica, beaches are narrower and affected by coastal erosion. East of the town, the coast is bordered by the Scarlino pine forest, extending toward Puntone di Scarlino, where a marina is located.

Further south, the coastline rises into the rocky headlands of the Bandite di Scarlino, featuring small coves such as Cala Martina, Cala Violina and Cala Civette. Beyond the mouth of the Alma River, the coast returns to low, sandy formations along the northern part of Castiglione della Pescaia, continuing toward Punta Ala, where rocky promontories and offshore formations mark the southeastern boundary of the gulf.
