= Colmata =

- Frazione
- Location of Colmata in Italy
- Coordinates: 42°57′53″N 10°33′1″E
- Country: Italy
- Region: Tuscany
- Province: Livorno (LI)
- Comune: Piombino
- Elevation: 2 m (6.6 ft)

Population (2011)
  - Total: 152
- Time zone: UTC+1 (CET)
  - Summer (DST): UTC+2 (CEST)
- Postal code: 57025
- Dialing code: (+39) 0565

Colmata is a village in Tuscany, central Italy, administratively a frazione of the comune of Piombino, province of Livorno. At the time of the 2011 census its population was 152.

Colmata is about 77 km from Livorno and 5 km from Piombino.
