= Populonia Stazione =

- Frazione
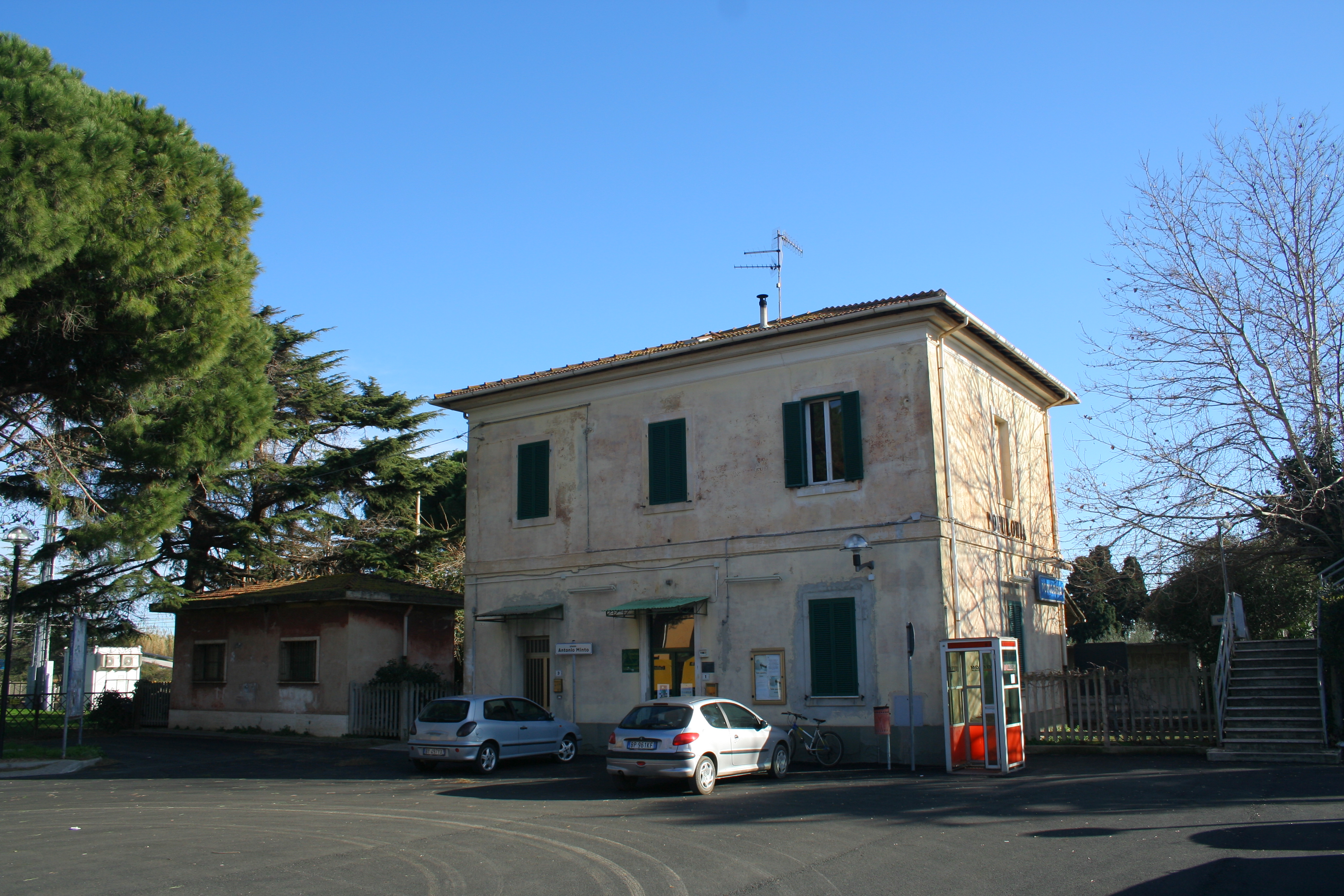

- Location of Populonia Stazione in Italy
- Coordinates: 42°59′44″N 10°32′24″E
- Country: Italy
- Region: Tuscany
- Province: Livorno (LI)
- Comune: Piombino
- Elevation: 10 m (33 ft)

Population (2011)
  - Total: 234
- Time zone: UTC+1 (CET)
  - Summer (DST): UTC+2 (CEST)
- Postal code: 57025
- Dialing code: (+39) 0565

Populonia Stazione is a village in Tuscany, central Italy, administratively a frazione of the comune of Piombino, province of Livorno. At the time of the 2011 census its population was 234.

The village is about 72 km from Livorno and 9 km from Piombino.

== Bibliography ==
- "Poggio all'Agnello". Dizionario Geografico Fisico Storico della Toscana. Florence. 1839.
