= Giovanni Battista Culiolo =

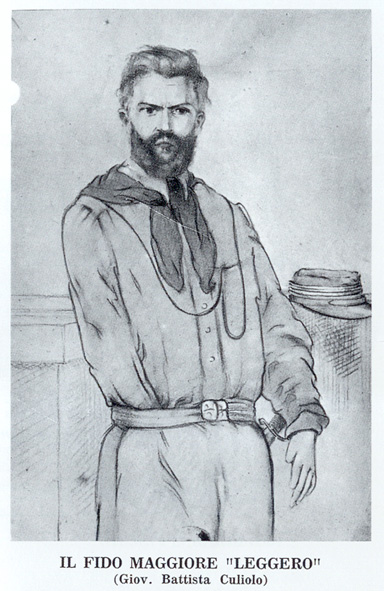
- Born: 17 September 1813; La Maddalena, Kingdom of Sardinia
- Died: 14 January 1871 (aged 57); La Maddalena, Kingdom of Italy
- Other names: Maggiore Leggero, "Leggero"
- Occupations: Soldier, patriot
- Known for: Military service under Giuseppe Garibaldi; participation in the Roman Republic (1849)

Giovanni Battista Culiolo (17 September 1813 – 14 January 1871), known by the nickname Maggiore Leggero (literally "Light Major"), was an Italian patriot and soldier associated with the campaigns of Giuseppe Garibaldi in South America and Italy.

== Life ==
Culiolo entered the Royal Sardinian Navy at a young age, earning the nickname "Leggero" due to his light build and agility. During a stop in Montevideo in 1839, he deserted and joined Garibaldi's Italian Legion, participating in military actions during the Uruguayan Civil War, including the battle of San Antonio (1846). In this period, he gained experience as an artilleryman within Garibaldi's forces.

He later returned to Italy and took part in the 1848–1849 revolutionary conflicts. During the defense of the Roman Republic, he fought under Garibaldi against French forces commanded by Charles Oudinot, distinguishing himself in the fighting at Porta San Pancrazio and being promoted on the field to the rank of major.

Following the fall of the Roman Republic, Culiolo accompanied Garibaldi and Anita during their retreat through central Italy. After the death of Anita, who fell ill in the marshes of Comacchio, he assisted Garibaldi during his escape through Tuscany, culminating in the departure from Cala Martina on 2 September 1849. He was later involved in further Garibaldi's exile activities across the Mediterranean and the Americas. Culiolo settled for a period in Puntarenas, Costa Rica, where he took part in conflicts against the forces of William Walker, during which he was seriously wounded.

After the Expedition of the Thousand (1860), Culiolo returned to Italy too late to take part in the campaign. He subsequently rejoined Garibaldi on the island of Caprera and served in various military capacities in later years. He died in La Maddalena in 1871.

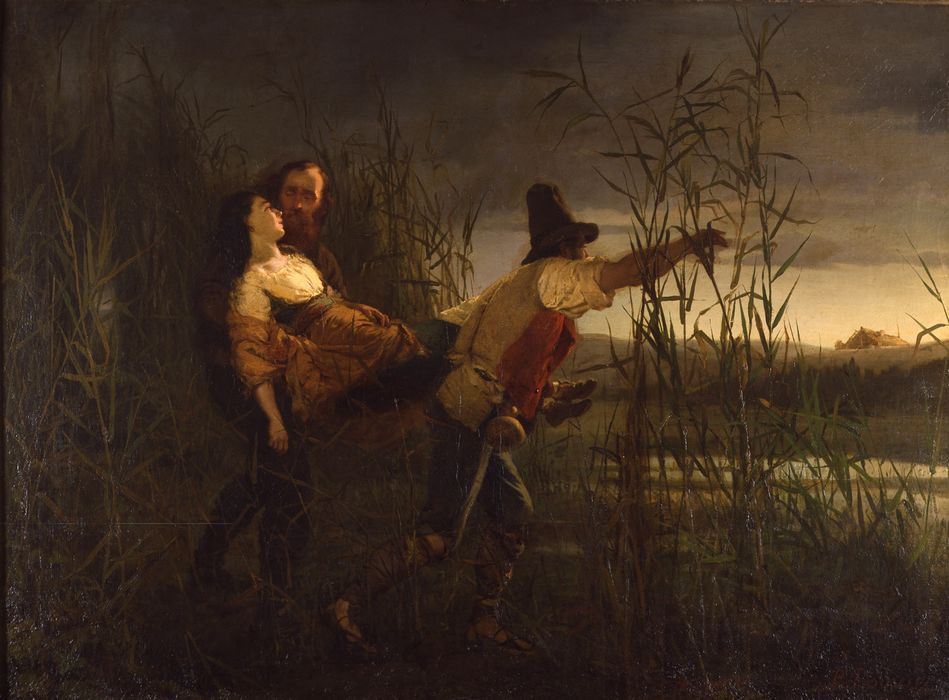
Garibaldi and Major Leggero carrying the dying Anita in the Comacchio marshes, painting by Pietro Bouvier.

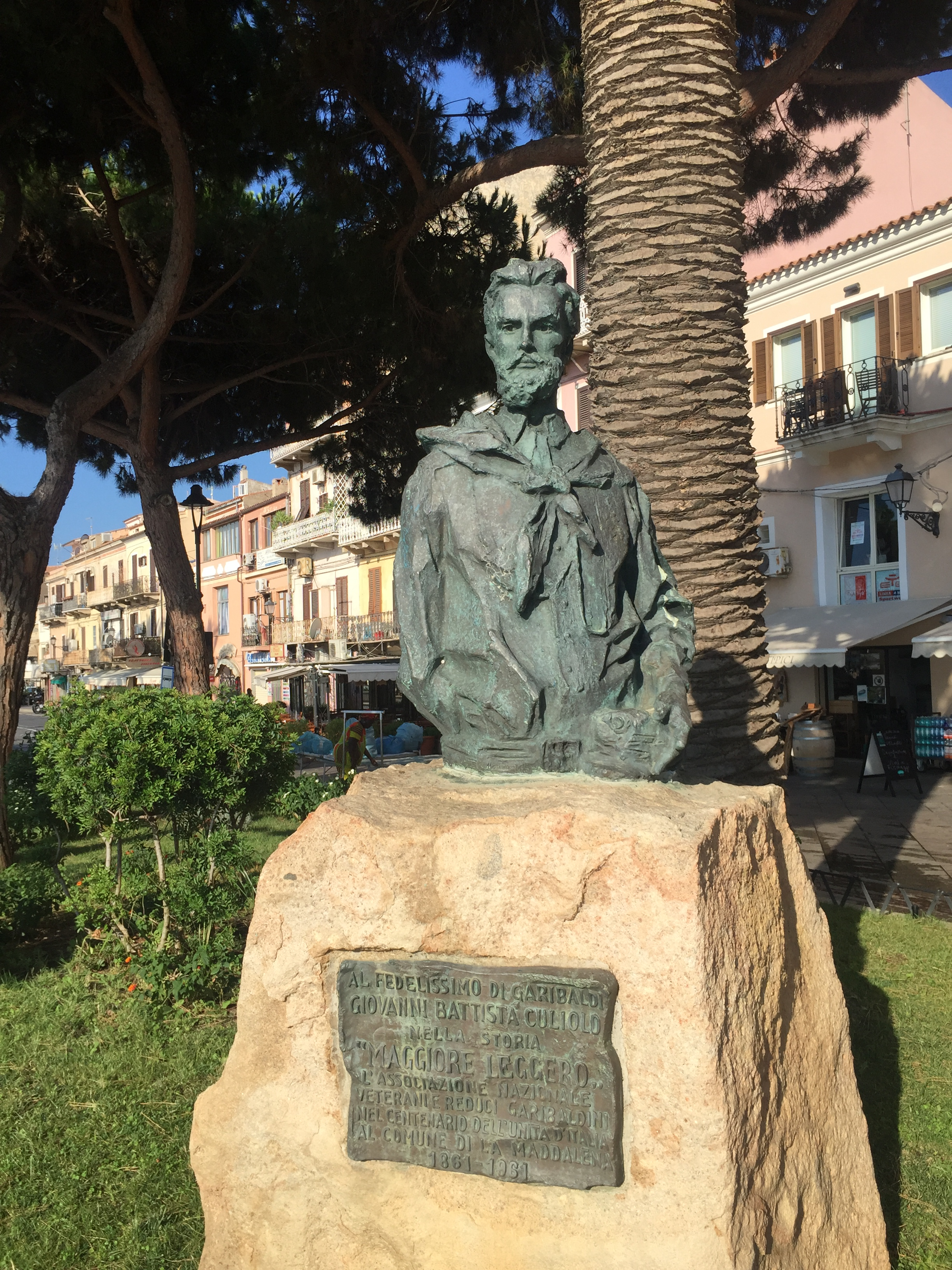
Bust of Culiolo in La Maddalena, placed in 1961

== In fiction ==
Major Leggero is portrayed by Massimiliano Franciosa in the 2012 Italian biographical miniseries Anita Garibaldi.

== Sources ==
- Vigna, Bepi (2015). Eroi dei due mondi. Garibaldi e il Maggior Leggero. L'epopea sudamericana nei fumetti. Taphros Editrice.
- Trevelyan, George Macaulay (1909). Garibaldi e la difesa della Repubblica romana. Bologna: Zanichelli.
