= La Sdriscia =

- Frazione
- Location of La Sdriscia in Italy
- Coordinates: 42°59′3″N 10°35′20″E
- Country: Italy
- Region: Tuscany
- Province: Livorno (LI)
- Comune: Piombino
- Elevation: 6 m (20 ft)

Population (2011)
  - Total: 147
- Time zone: UTC+1 (CET)
  - Summer (DST): UTC+2 (CEST)
- Postal code: 57025
- Dialing code: (+39) 0565

La Sdriscia is a village in Tuscany, central Italy, administratively a frazione of the comune of Piombino, province of Livorno. At the time of the 2011 census its population was 147.

La Sdriscia is about 76 km from Livorno and 10 km from Piombino.
