= Thamisanqa Molepo =

German actor (born 1970)

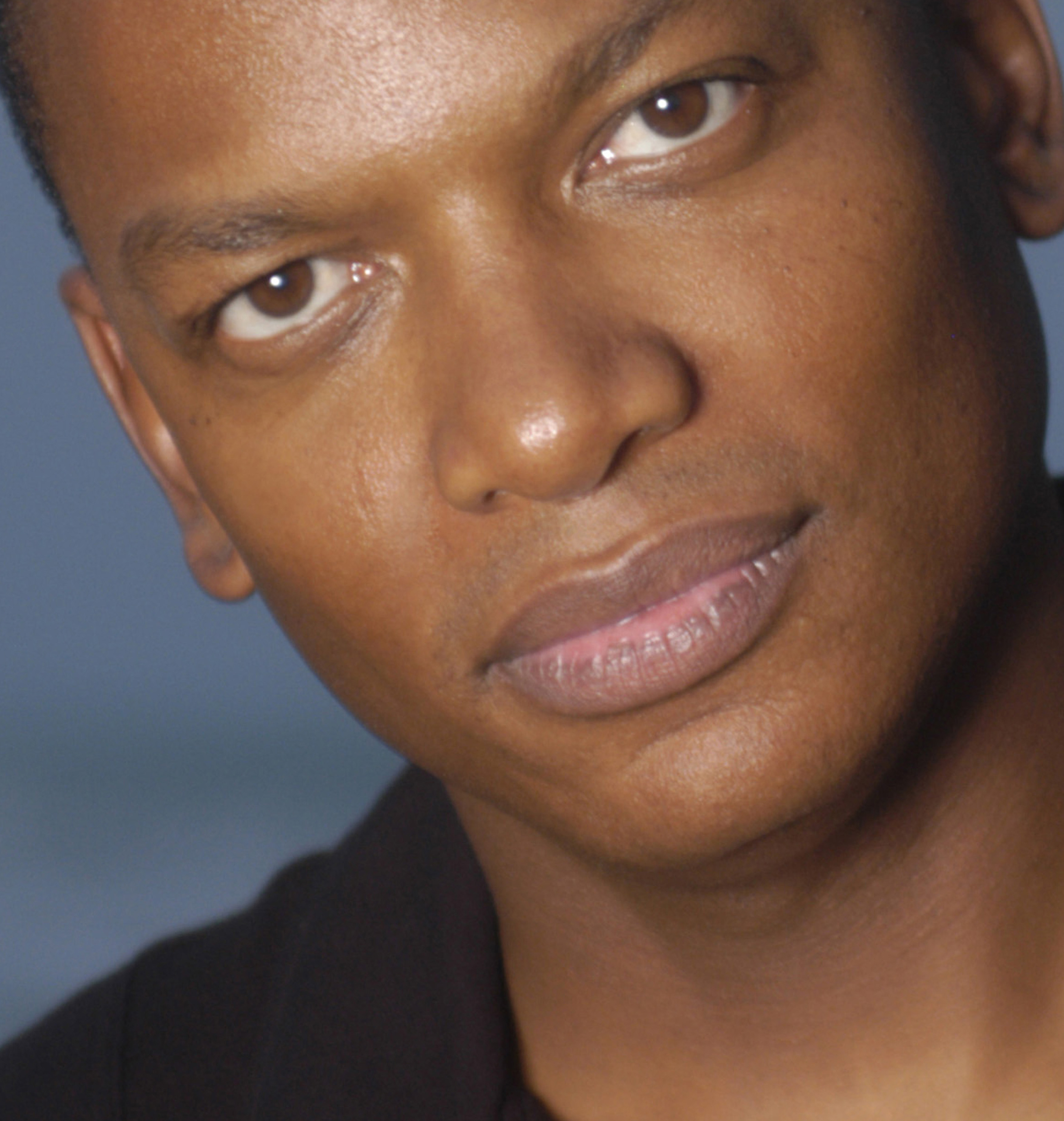
- Molepo in 2007
- Born: 21 January 1970 (age 55); Hannover, Germany
- Occupation: Actor
- Years active: 1990–present

Thamisanqa Molepo (born January 21, 1970) is a German actor.

== Filmography ==
=== Film ===
- Vietato ai minori (1992)
- The Teddy Bear (1994)
- Concrete Romance (2007)
- Tutto tutto niente niente (2012)
- The Face of an Angel (2014)

=== Television ===
- Bianco e Nero - Altri particolari in cronaca... (1990)
- Classe di ferro (1991)
- Quelli della speciale (1992)
- Die Fremde (1994)
- Nati ieri (2007)
- Ho sposato uno sbirro (2008)
- Tutta la verità (2009)
- Cugino & cugino (2010)
- Anita Garibaldi (2012)
- Suburra: Blood on Rome (2020)
