= Scarlino railway station =

Railway station in Italy

Scarlino

General information
- Location: Via della Stazione; Scarlino Scalo 58020; Scarlino, Grosseto, Tuscany; Italy
- Coordinates: 42°56′30.8″N 10°50′12.4″E
- Operator: Rete Ferroviaria Italiana; Trenitalia
- Line: Tirrenica
- Tracks: 2

Other information
- Classification: Bronze

History
- Opened: 5 December 1900; 125 years ago
Location
- Location within Tuscany Location within Italy

Scarlino railway station is an Italian railway station on the Tirrenica railway line, located in the village of Scarlino Scalo, 7 km from the center of Scarlino, Province of Grosseto, Tuscany.

== History ==
The station opened on 5 December 1900 as a new railway stop on the Pisa–Rome railway between the stations of Follonica and Gavorrano.

== Train services and movements ==
Regular passenger services to the station consist of regionale and regionale veloce services, which run frequently to Grosseto, Pisa Centrale, Livorno Centrale, Orbetello, Campiglia Marittima, and Florence SMN.

== See also ==
- History of rail transport in Italy
- List of railway stations in Tuscany
- Rail transport in Italy
- Railway stations in Italy
