= Bandite di Scarlino =

Protected area in Tuscany, Italy

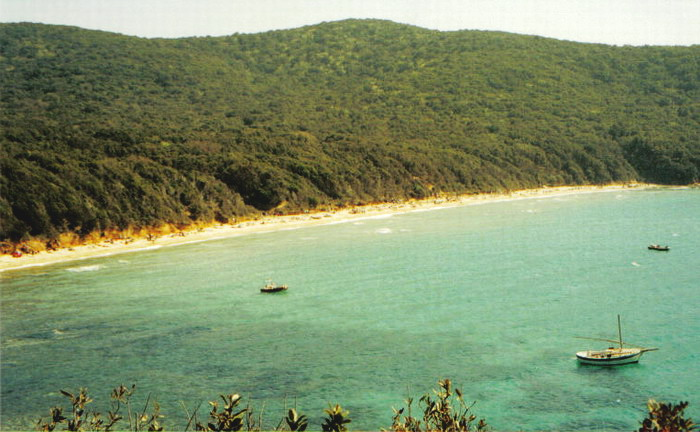
- Interactive map of Bandite di Scarlino
- Location: Scarlino, Province of Grosseto, Tuscany, Italy
- Nearest city: Follonica, Grosseto
- Area: c. 8,700 ha
- Max. elevation: 213 m

The Bandite di Scarlino is a natural area of approximately 8,700 hectares located in northern province of Grosseto, Tuscany, Italy. It extends across the municipalities of Scarlino, Castiglione della Pescaia, and Gavorrano, forming part of the northern Maremma region.

== Geography ==
The territory is predominantly hilly and represents a continuation of the Colline Metallifere toward the Tyrrhenian Sea, where it forms a coastal promontory overlooking the Gulf of Follonica. The promontory reaches elevations of about 213 m; inland, the terrain rises progressively to Monte d'Alma (557 m).

The coastline south of Puntone di Scarlino is mostly rocky, interspersed with small coves such as Cala Martina and, further south, Cala Violina, known for its fine white sand, and Cala Civette. It is designated as a protected natural area of local significance.

Part of the Bandite's territory also includes the Scarlino Marsh, a site of regional environmental interest.

== Sources ==
- Attraversando le Bandite di Scarlino. Follonica: Koinè Multimedia. 2001.
- Le terre pubbliche dell'alta maremma toscana: Le bandite di Scarlino ed i suoi dintorni. Comuni di Scarlino, Castiglione della Pescaia, Gavorrano. 1997.
