= Anita Garibaldi (miniseries) =

- Genre: Historical drama
- Written by: Massimo De Rita; Mario Falcone; Amedeo Minghi
- Directed by: Claudio Bonivento
- Starring: Valeria Solarino; Giorgio Pasotti; Tosca D'Aquino; Francesca Cavallin; Nicoletta Romanoff
- Composer: Amedeo Minghi
- Original language: Italian

Production
- Cinematography: Fabio Zamarion
- Editor: Antonio Siciliano
- Running time: 198 min.

Original release
- Network: Rai 1
- Release: January 16 – January 17, 2012

Anita Garibaldi is a 2012 Italian television miniseries directed by Claudio Bonivento and starring Valeria Solarino in the title role.

It is based on real life events of Anita Garibaldi, wife and comrade-in-arms of Italian revolutionary Giuseppe Garibaldi. It was shot between Portugal, Bulgaria and Italy, with a budget of about 6 million euros.

== Cast ==
- Valeria Solarino as Anita
- Giorgio Pasotti as Giuseppe Garibaldi
- Tosca D'Aquino as Ester
- Nicoletta Romanoff as Margareth Furrell
- Fabio Galli as Luigi Rossetti
- Nini Salerno as Aurelio Saffi
- Thamisanqa Molepo as Andrea Aguyar
- Massimiliano Franciosa as Leggero
- Bruno Conti as Domenico Cirillo
- Mauro Marino as Ugo Bassi
- Lorenzo Roma as Righetto
- Jonis Bashir as Pedro
- Gianfelice Facchetti as Luciano Manara
- Filippo Scarafia as Goffredo Mameli
- Pietro Ghislandi as Gioacchino Bonnet
- Francesca Antonelli as Annetta
- Maria Pia Calzone as Enrichetta Pisacane
- Rosa Pianeta as Rosa Garibaldi
- Francesco D’Avanzo as Paolo Antonini
- Alessandro Lombardo as Giuseppe Mazzini
- Edoardo Purgatori as Nino Bixio
- Francesca Cavallin as Cristina Trivulzio Belgiojoso
- Giorgio Gobbi as Ciceruacchio
