= Pecora (river) =

River in Grosseto, Tuscany

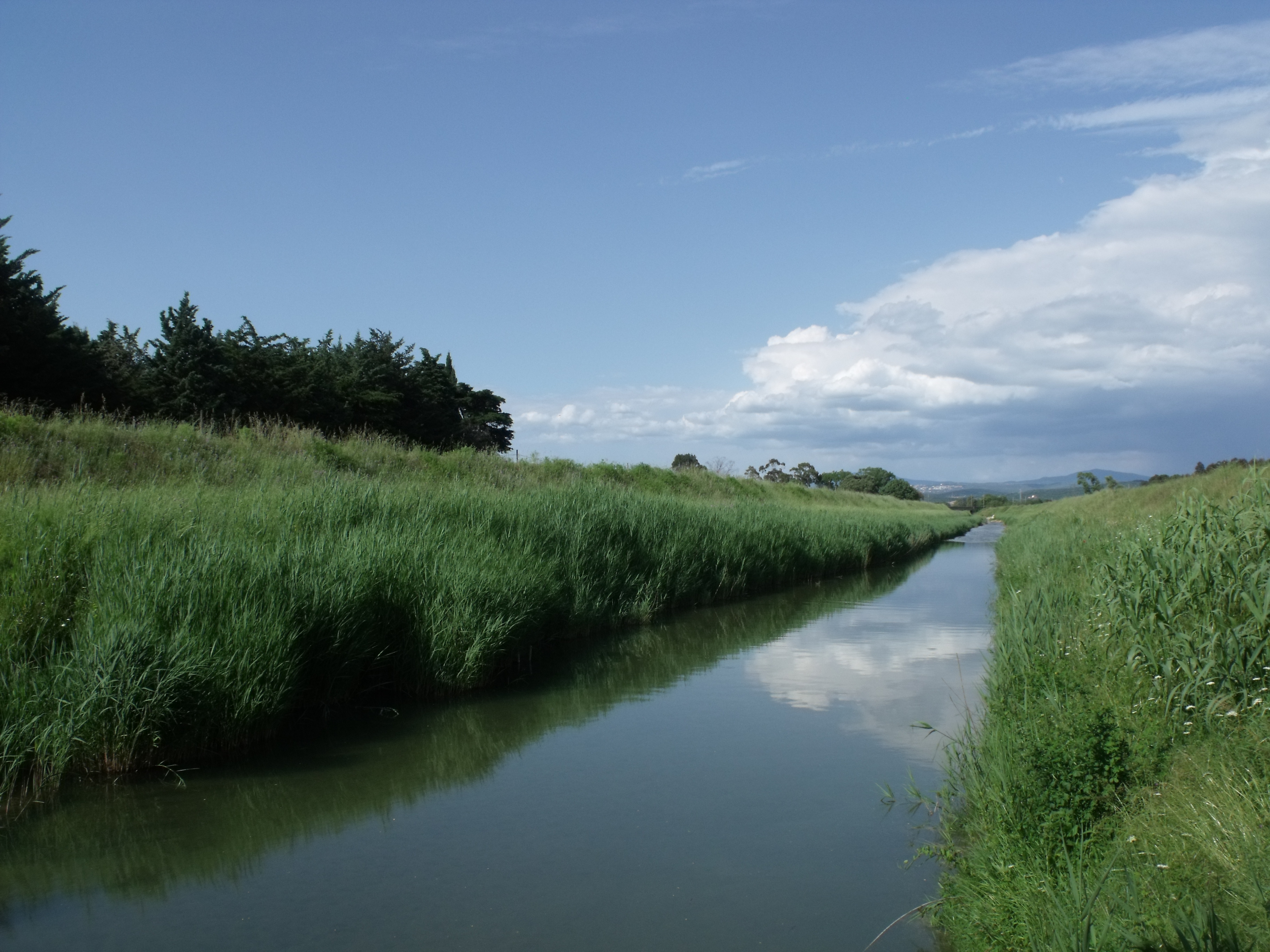

- Location of mouth

Location
- Country: Italy
- Region: Tuscany
- Municipalities: Follonica, Massa Marittima, Scarlino

Physical characteristics
- Source
  - location: Monte Arsenti, Massa Marittima
- Mouth: Tyrrhenian Sea
  - location: Puntone di Scarlino
  - coordinates: 42.8900°N 10.7905°E
- Length: 26.5 km (16.5 mi)

The Pecora is a river located in the province of Grosseto, Tuscany, in central Italy. It originates in the Colline Metallifere, just north of Massa Marittima.

From its source, the river initially flows in a southwesterly direction. After a bend to the left, it continues southward, forming the plain known as the Pecora plain, situated between Follonica, Gavorrano, and Scarlino. This plain represents the northernmost section of the Maremma of Grosseto. The river extends for approximately 11.8 km in mountainous and hilly terrain, and for the remaining 14.7 km across flatlands. The Pecora flows into the Scarlino Marsh, after which its waters reach the Tyrrhenian Sea near the village of Puntone di Scarlino, within the Gulf of Follonica, through a system of artificial canals.

Between 1902 and 1944, a metal girder bridge with a span of 28 metres crossed the river, allowing the passage of the Massa Marittima–Follonica railway. This line was originally constructed as a mining railway. The bridge was demolished during World War II due to war-related events.

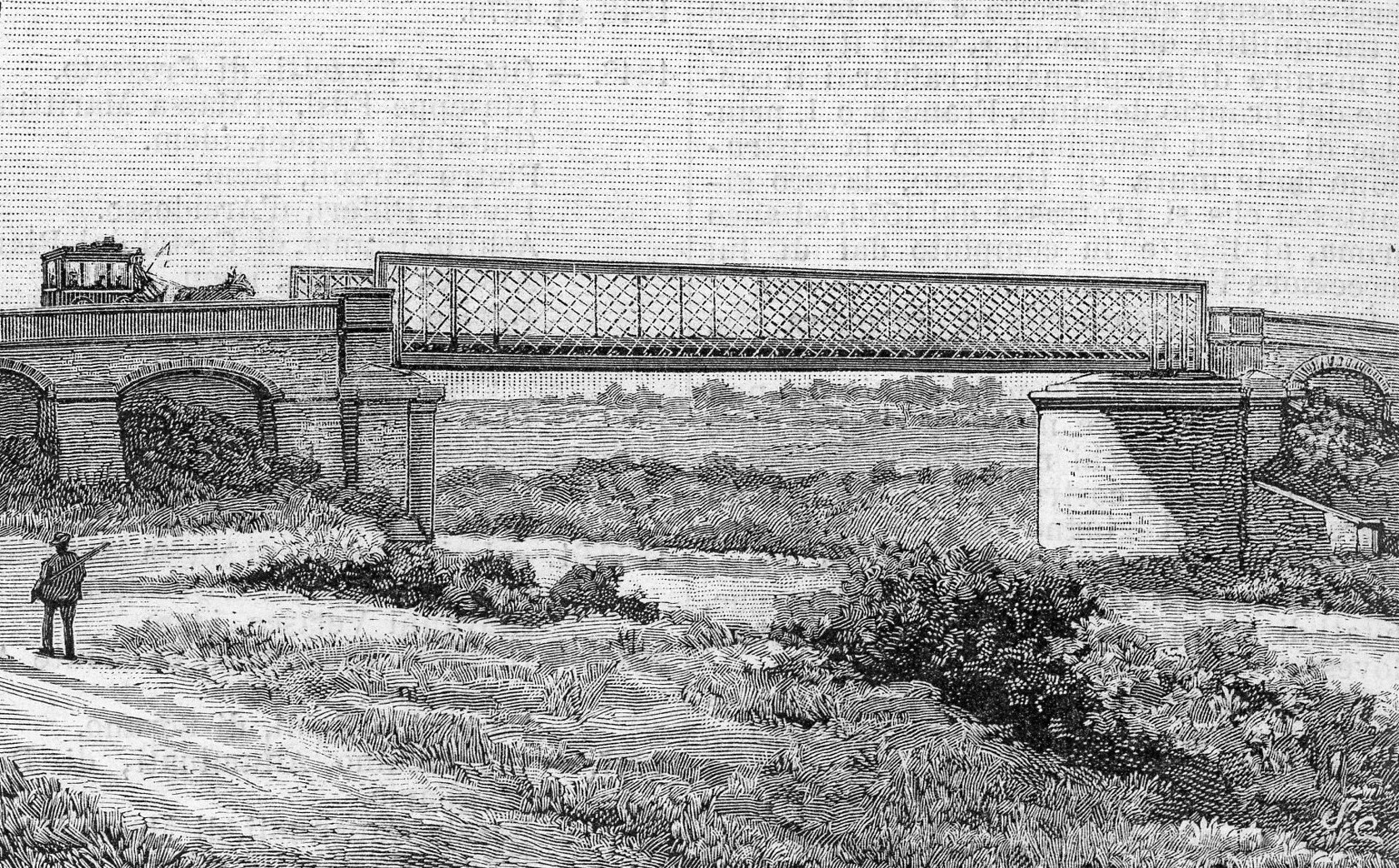
The old railway bridge over the Pecora in a woodcut from 1896.
