= Scarlino Marsh =

Wetland in Tuscany, Italy

- Padule di Scarlino
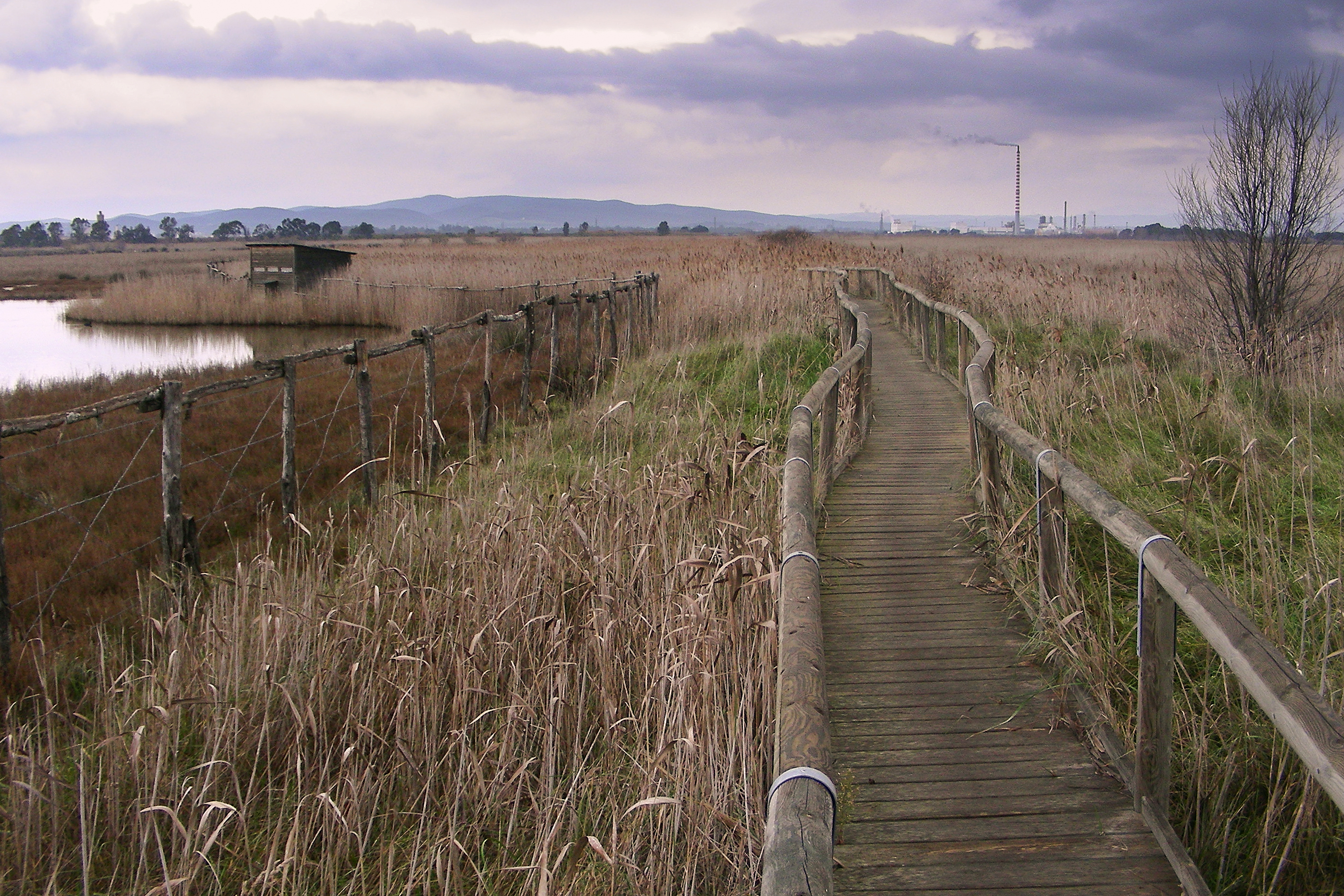
- Interactive map of Scarlino Marsh
- Location: Puntone di Scarlino, Scarlino, Province of Grosseto, Tuscany
- Area: 150 ha (370 acres)

Ramsar Wetland
- Official name: Padule di Scarlino
- Designated: 21 October 2013
- Reference no.: 2585

Scarlino Marsh (Italian: Padule di Scarlino) is a coastal wetland in Tuscany, central Italy, located near the hamlet of Puntone di Scarlino in the municipality of Scarlino, province of Grosseto. Covering approximately 150 hectares, it represents one of the last remaining examples of the former Maremma wetland landscape, largely lost due to historical land reclamation works.

The wetland lies in a flat alluvial area between the Pecora River and the Canale Allacciante, only a short distance from the Tyrrhenian Sea. It is a transitional environment, partly brackish and partly freshwater, shaped by seasonal hydrological fluctuations.

Scarlino Marsh is a site of regional interest in the province of Grosseto, partially included within the Tomboli di Follonica Nature Reserve and largely encompassed by the proposed Site of Community Importance Padule e Costiere di Scarlino protected area. The area was designated a wetland of international importance under the Ramsar Convention on 21 October 2013.

Ecologically, the area is characterised by shallow water bodies (locally known as chiari), reed beds, and extensive stands of Phragmites australis in the wetter sectors.

Recorded waterbird species include western marsh harrier (Circus aeruginosus), Eurasian bittern (Botaurus stellaris), and ferruginous duck (Aythya nyroca). The area is also of particular conservation interest for a breeding population of moustached warbler (Acrocephalus melanopogon), regarded as locally significant in southern Tuscany, and it functions as an important site for migration stopover and wintering of aquatic birds.
