= Cala Martina =

Cove in Tuscany, Italy

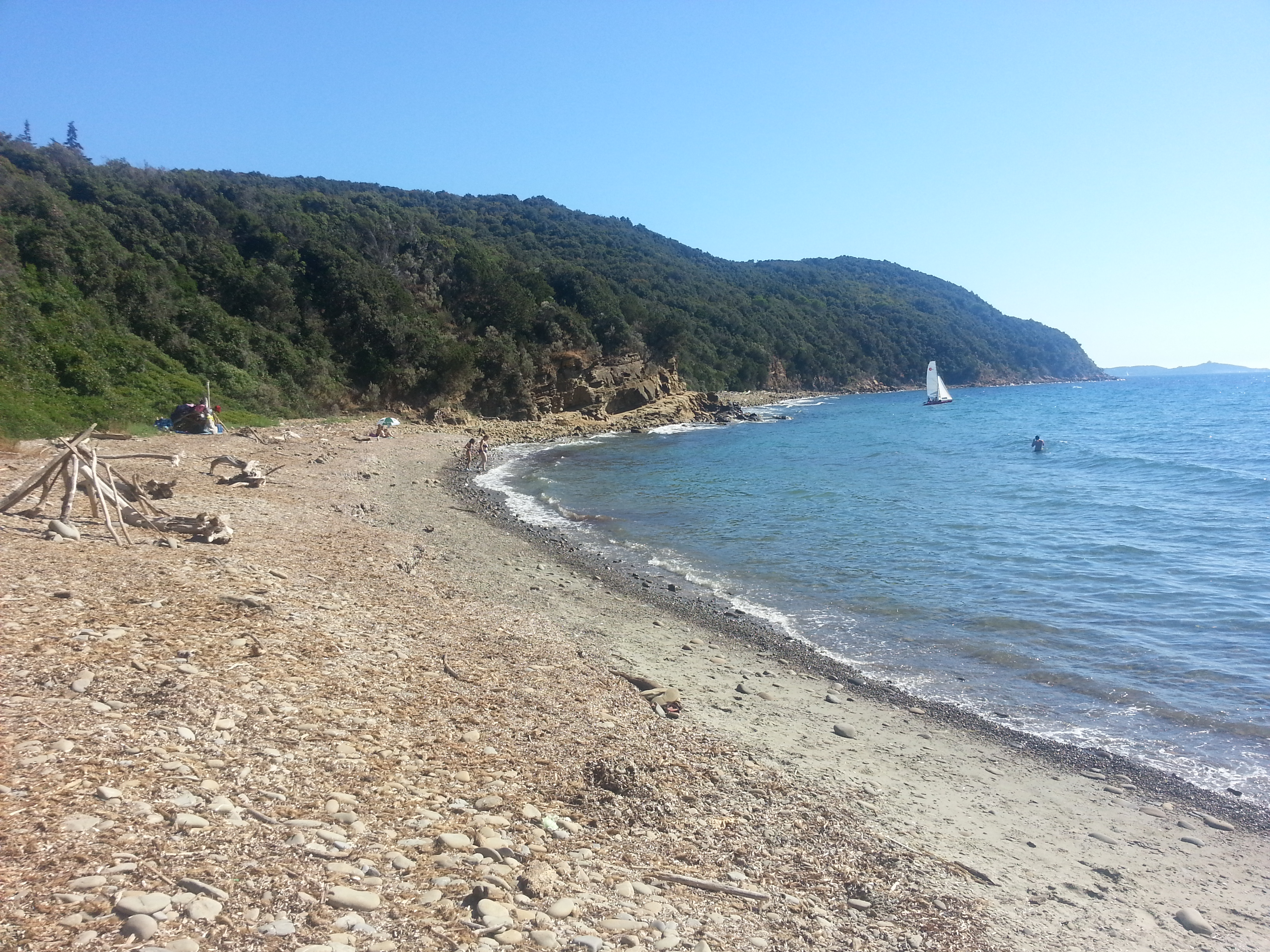
- Interactive map of Cala Martina
- Location: Scarlino, Tuscany, Italy
- Coordinates: 42°51′58″N 10°46′18″E
- Type: Inlet
- Part of: Gulf of Follonica, Tyrrhenian Sea
- Basin countries: Italy

Cala Martina is a coastal inlet located in the Maremma region of Tuscany, Italy, south of Puntone di Scarlino, within the municipality of Scarlino. It opens onto the Tyrrhenian Sea and lies within the Bandite di Scarlino reserve.

== Geography ==
Cala Martina is a narrow inlet with predominantly rocky shores and clear waters, enclosed between Punta Francese to the north and Punta Martina to the south. Beyond the latter headland, further along the coast, lies the larger and more open Cala Violina.

== History ==
Cala Martina is known as the site where Giuseppe Garibaldi, pursued by papal troops, embarked on a fishing boat on 2 September 1849 in order to reach Porto Venere. He was assisted by members of the local population. The event is commemorated by a monument located along the path leading to the cove, created in 1949 by the sculptor Tolomeo Faccendi.

== See also ==
- Gulf of Follonica
- Palazzo Guelfi
