= Piombino =

- Comune
- Comune di Piombino
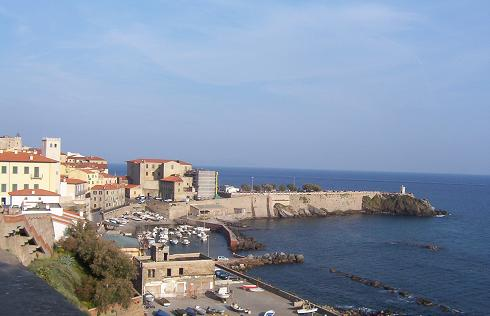
- Panorama of Piombino

- Coat of arms

- Location within Tuscany Location within Italy
- Coordinates: 42°55′N 10°32′E
- Country: Italy
- Region: Tuscany
- Province: Livorno (LI)
- Frazioni: Baratti, Colmata, Fiorentina, La Sdriscia, Populonia, Populonia Stazione, Riotorto

Government
  - Mayor: Francesco Ferrari (Fratelli d'Italia)

Area
  - Total: 129 km^{2} (50 sq mi)
- Elevation: 21 m (69 ft)

Population (January 2017)
  - Total: 34,041
  - Density: 264/km^{2} (683/sq mi)
- Demonym: Piombinesi
- Time zone: UTC+1 (CET)
  - Summer (DST): UTC+2 (CEST)
- Postal code: 57025
- Dialing code: 0565
- Patron saint: St Anastasia and St Augustine
- Website: Official website

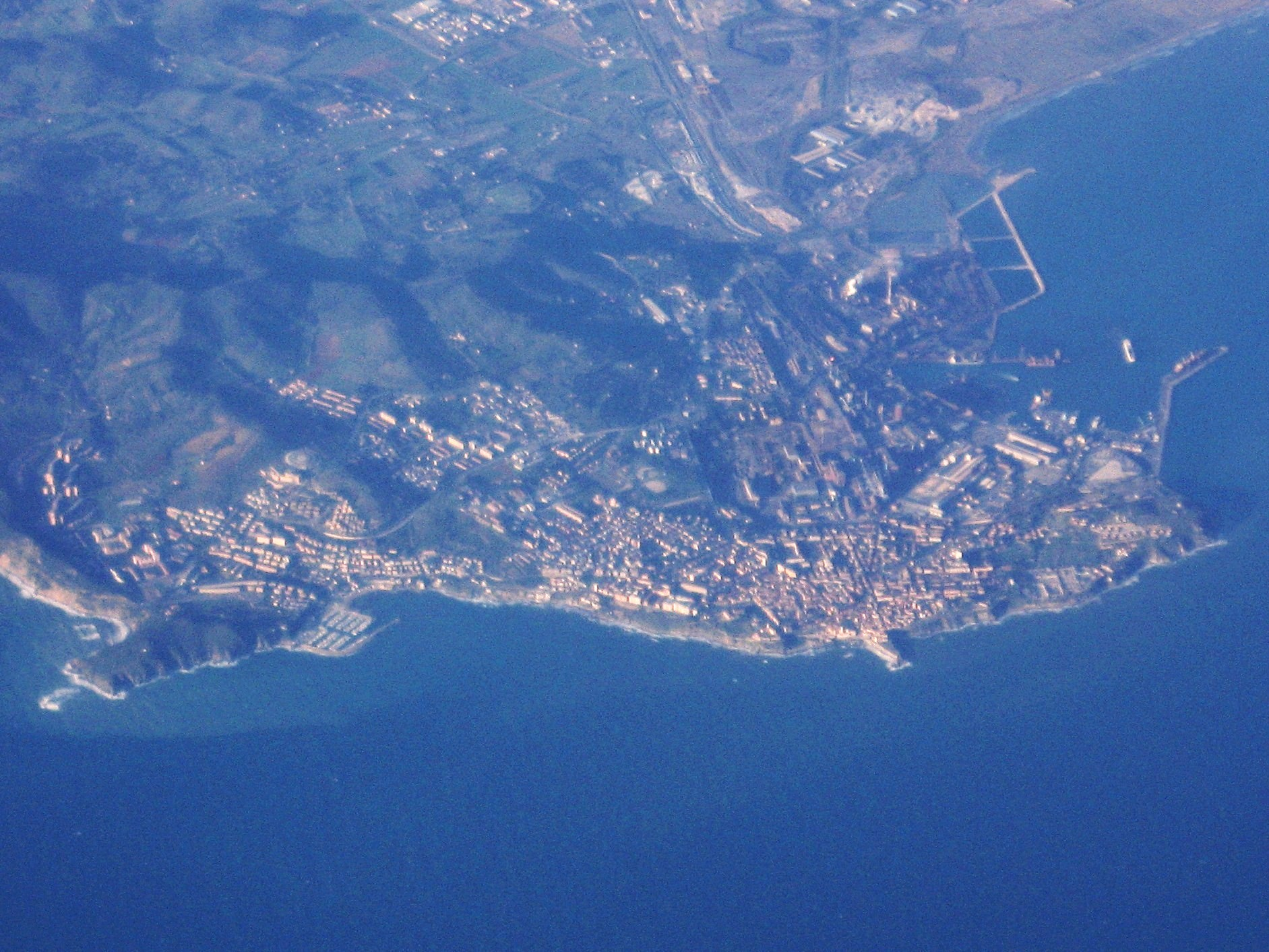
Aerial view

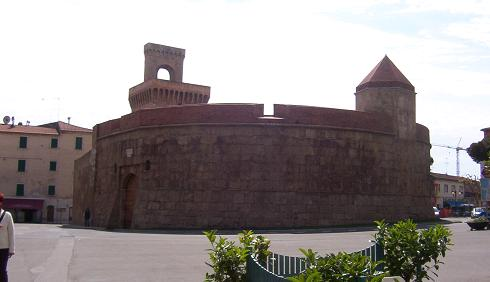
The Rivellino, the ancient main gate built in 1447 by Rinaldo Orsini

Piombino is an Italian town and comune (municipality) of about 35,000 inhabitants in the province of Livorno, southern Tuscany. It lies on the border between the Ligurian Sea and the Tyrrhenian Sea, in front of Elba Island and at the northern side of Maremma.

== Overview ==
It has an ancient historical centre, derived from the time in which it was the Etruscans' port, in the surroundings of Populonia. In the Middle Ages, it was instead an important port of the Republic of Pisa.

Its hinterland hosts a considerable industrial area. Its port is still heavily used, both for industry and for tourism, with ferry boats to Portoferraio (Elba) and Olbia (Sardinia).

== Geography ==
The bounding communes of Piombino are Campiglia Marittima, Follonica, San Vincenzo and Suvereto. The town has seven civil parishes (frazioni): Baratti, Colmata, Fiorentina, La Sdriscia, Populonia, Populonia Stazione and Riotorto.

== History ==
=== Early history ===
The area of modern Piombino was settled since ancient times. During the Etruscan era the main city in the area was Populonia, now a frazione within the comune of Piombino.

The name Piombino derives almost certainly from Populino, meaning "Small Populonia", which the refugees gave to a small village where they had taken refuge after the city had been attacked by Greek pirates (9th century). It is also probable that Piombino had already been founded during the period of Ostrogoth rule.

In 1022 the Monastery of San Giustiniano was founded in the area, boosting the activity of fishermen, sailors and workers. In 1115 Piombino submitted to the Republic of Pisa, becoming its second main port: authority was exerted by a Capitano ("Captain"). During the conflicts between the Pisane and the Genoese (12th–13th centuries), the city was sacked various times. In 1248 the Capitano Ugolino Arsopachi built the Channels.

=== Lordship of Piombino ===
The Castle of Piombino remained a Pisan possession until Gerardo Appiani, after ceding Pisa to the Milanese Visconti, carved out an independent lordship centred on Piombino that included the islands of the Tuscan Archipelago: Elba, Pianosa, Montecristo, Capraia, Gorgona, and Giglio, for his family, who held the state intermittently until 1634.

In 1445, through his marriage with Caterina Appiani, Rinaldo Orsini acquired the Lordship of Piombino. In 1501–1503 the lordship came under the control of Cesare Borgia. After Cosimo I de' Medici had occupied the Lordship of Piombino in the course of the war against Siena, in 1553 and 1555 a French-Ottoman fleet attacked Piombino, but was pushed back. In 1557, a peace treaty reinstated the Appiani as rulers of Piombino, with the exception of Portoferraio, which was given to the Grand Duchy of Tuscany, and the area of Orbetello, which became part of the State of the Presidi under Spanish control.

=== Principality of Piombino ===
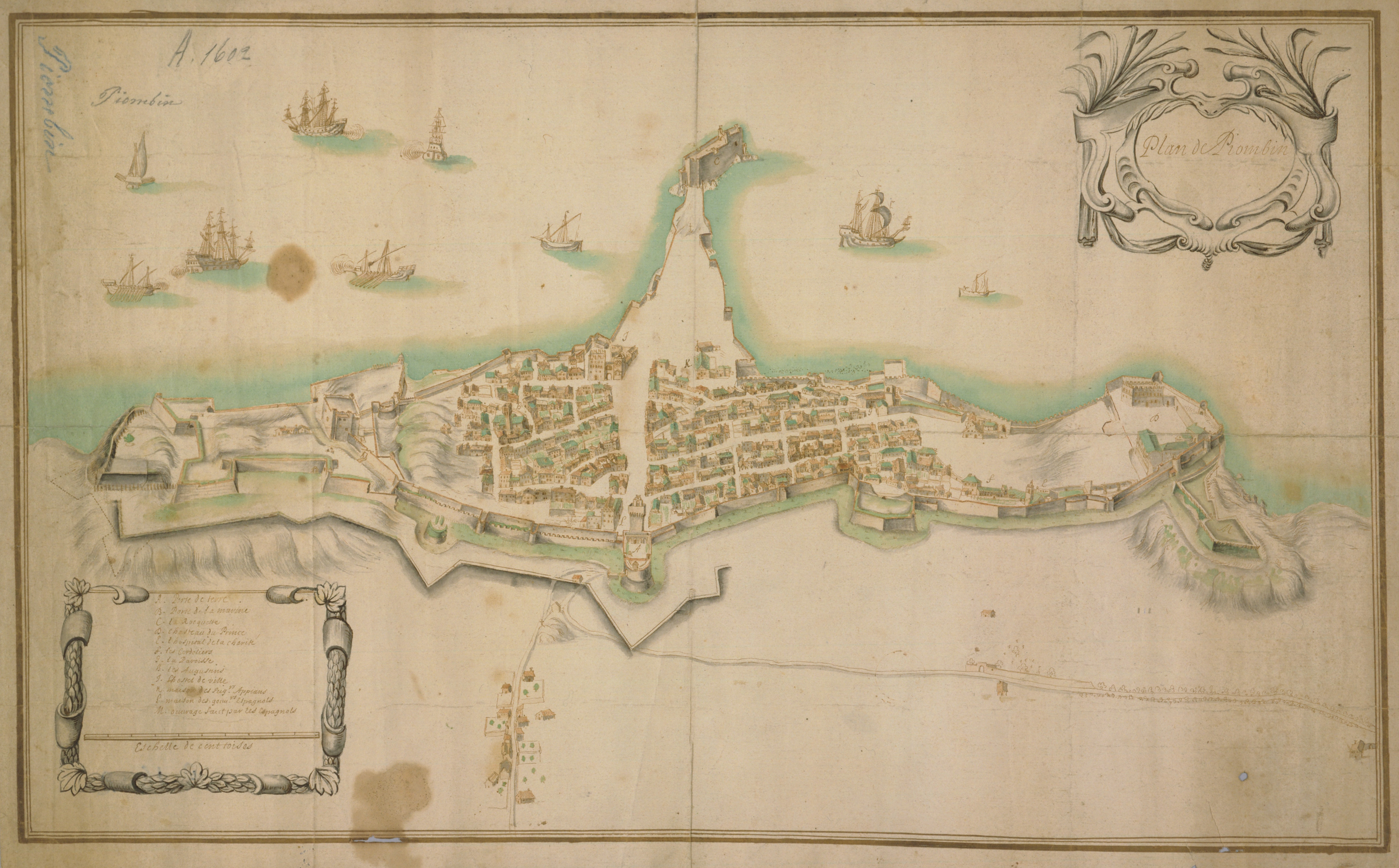
Map of Piombino and its fortifications, 18th century

In 1594, the Lordship of Piombino was raised to the status of a principality by the Holy Roman Emperor Rudolf II of Habsburg, the first Prince of Piombino being Alessandro Appiani d'Aragona.

In 1634, the title was acquired by the Ludovisi family, whose member Niccolò I had married the heiress Polissena Appiani in 1632.

In 1708, the principality became ruled by the Boncompagni family with Antonio I as prince.

=== Annexation ===
In 1801, Napoleon abolished the principality, Piombino and its lands being annexed by the Kingdom of Etruria; in 1809 they were given to Napoleon's sister, Elisa Baciocchi. After Napoleon's final defeat and the Congress of Vienna, the state of Piombino was annexed by the Grand Duchy of Tuscany. It became part of the unified Kingdom of Italy in 1860.

=== World War II ===
During World War II, in the days that followed the announcement of the Armistice of Cassibile, Piombino was the setting for one of the first episodes of the Italian resistance. On 10 September 1943, during Operation Achse, a small German flotilla, commanded by Kapitänleutnant Karl-Wolf Albrand, tried to enter the harbour of Piombino but was denied access by the port authorities. General Cesare Maria De Vecchi, in command of the Italian coastal forces (and a former Fascist Gerarca), commanded the port authorities to allow the German flotilla to enter, against the advice of Commander Amedeo Capuano, the Naval commander of the harbour. Once they entered and landed, the German forces showed a hostile behaviour, and it became clear that their intent was to occupy the town; the local population asked for a resolved reaction by the Italian forces, threatening an insurrection, but the senior Italian commander, general Fortunato Perni, instead ordered his tanks to open fire on the civilians, to disperse the crowds; De Vecchi forbade any action against the Germans. This however did not stop the protests; some junior officers, acting on their own initiative and against the orders (Perni and De Vecchi even tried to dismiss them for this), assumed command and started distributing weapons to the population, and civilian volunteers joined the Italian sailors and soldiers in the defense. Battle broke out at 21:15 on 10 September, between the German landing forces (who aimed to occupy the town centre) and the Italian coastal batteries, tanks, and civilian population. Italian tanks sank the German torpedo boat TA11; Italian artillery also sank seven Marinefährprahme, the péniches Mainz and Meise (another péniche, Karin, was scuttled at the harbour entrance as a blockship) and six Luftwaffe service boats (Fl.B.429, Fl.B.538, Fl.C.3046, Fl.C.3099, Fl.C.504 e Fl.C.528), and heavily damaged the torpedo boat TA 9 and the steamers Carbet and Capitano Sauro (formerly Italian). Sauro and Carbet were scuttled because of the damage they had suffered. The German attack was repelled; by the dawn of 11 September, 120 Germans had been killed and about 200–300 captured, 120 of them wounded. Italian casualties had been 4 killed (two sailors, one Guardia di Finanza brigadier, and one civilian) and a dozen wounded; four Italian submarine chasers (VAS 208, 214, 219 and 220) were also sunk during the fighting. Later in the morning, however, De Vecchi ordered the prisoners to be released, and had their weapons given back to them. New popular protests broke out, as the Italian units were disbanded and the senior commanders fled from the city; the divisional command surrendered Piombino to the Germans on 12 September, and the city was occupied. Many of the sailors, soldiers and citizens who had fought in the battle of Piombino retreated to the surrounding woods and formed the first partisan formations in the area. For the deeds of its citizens, the town received a Gold Medal for Military Valour from President Carlo Azeglio Ciampi.

== Main sights ==
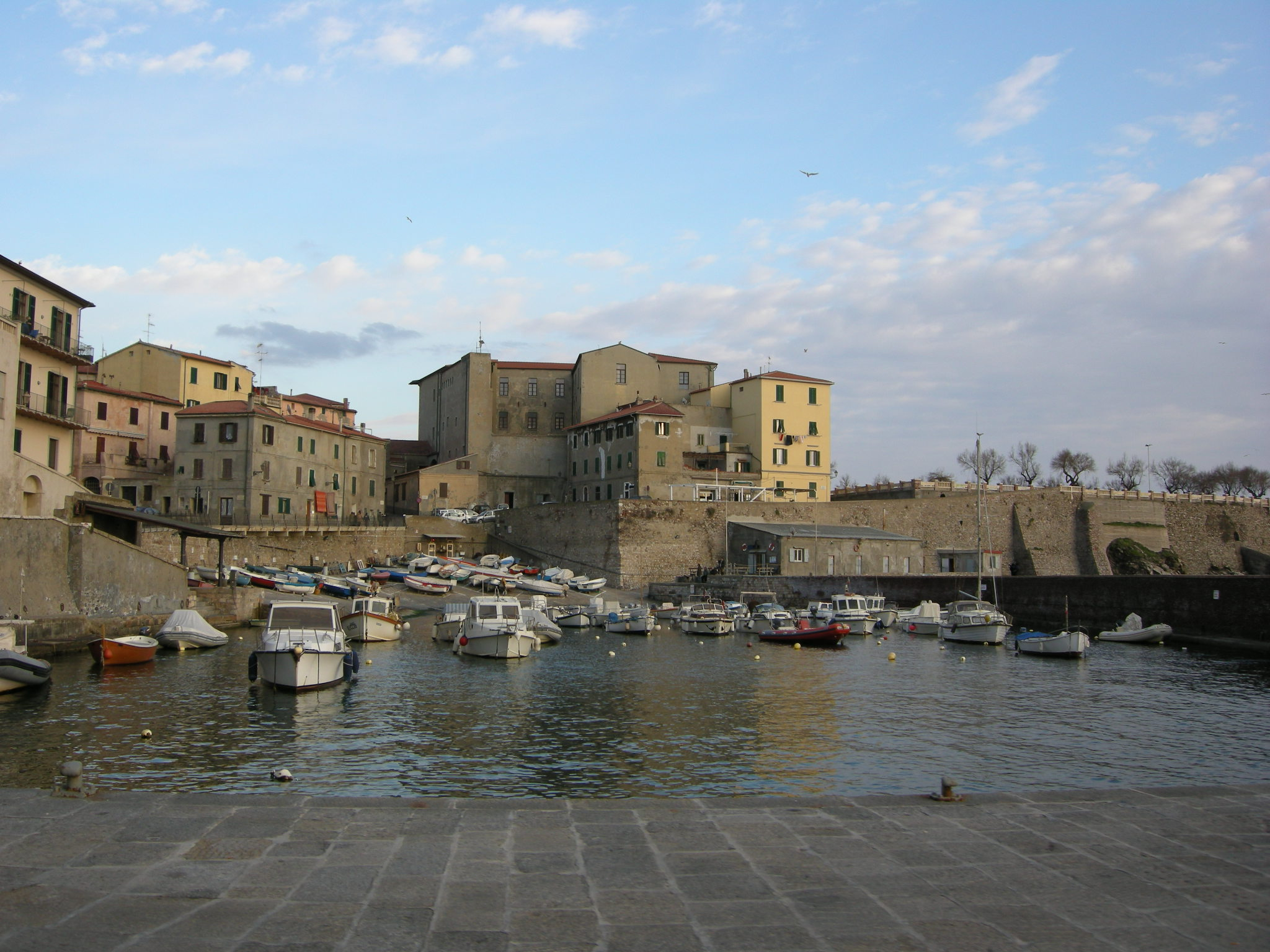
The ancient port

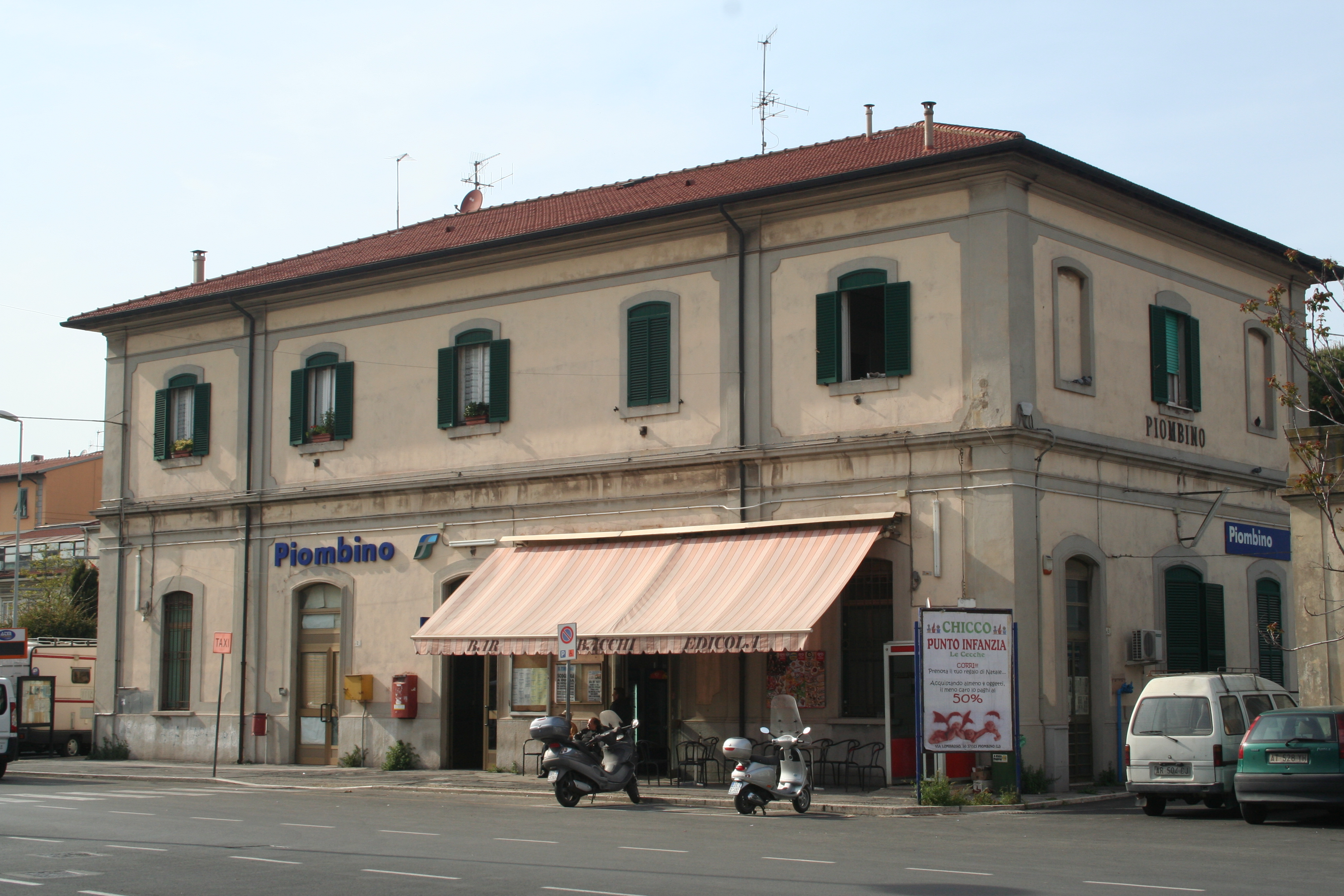
Train station building

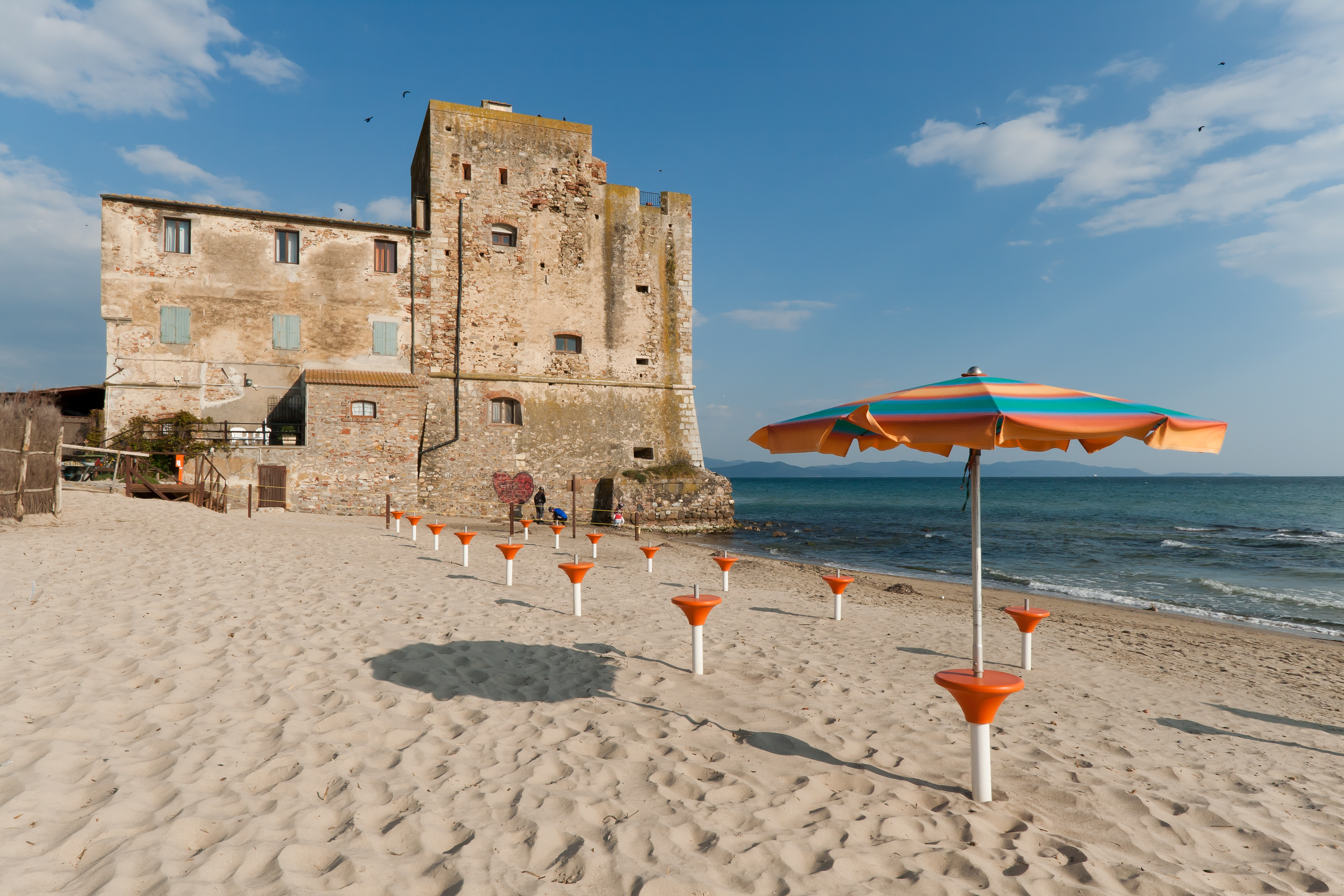
Torre Mozza, 16th century Tuscan coastal tower. It is now a historical and tourist attraction in the Follonica gulf, in front of Elba island.

- Co-Cathedral of Sant'Antimo (c. 1377), built by the Augustinians and originally dedicated to St. Michael. It is in Pisane-Gothic style, a memoir of the rule of Pisa over Piombino. The interior, with two naves (one added in 1933), houses precious works by Andrea Guardi, including a Baptismal Font. The counter-façade has Renaissance sepulchres of the Appiani family. Also by Guardi is the cloister (1470).
- The Rivellino (Walls Tower-Gate) is the city's most ancient monument (1212).
- The Chiesa della Misericordia (early 13th century). It houses a precious 15th-century crucifix.
- The Cassero Pisano (Castle). It is formed by two distinct buildings, the Fortress, built under Cosimo I de' Medici (1552–53), and the Cassero (late 15th century), the latter used as a military jail until 1959.
- The Palazzo Comunale (Town Hall), mostly a modern reconstruction of the ancient Palazzo degli Anziani (1435). In the Musters Hall, with portraits of the Princes of Piombino.
- Chapel of St. Anne, a noteworthy Renaissance work by Guardi. Annexed is the Torre Civica (Town Tower, 16th century).
- The Cisterna di Cittadella (Citadel's Cistern), also by Guardi. On the sides are the portraits of Jacopo III Appiani and his son and wife, later disfigured by order of Cesare Borgia.
- Casa delle Bifore (House of the Mullioned Windows, 1280s).
- The Natural Province Reserve Padule Orti Bottagone, created in 1998, next to the locality of Torre del Sale.

== Twin towns – sister cities ==
Piombino is twinned with:

- Flémalle, Belgium

== Miscellanea ==
Piombino has schools, a gymnasium (middle school), lyceums (high schools), churches, banks, parks and squares. In the locality of Punta Falcone is an astronomical observatory, created in 1976. East of Piombino, there was a power station with 1280 MW generation capacity with two chimneys, each 195 metres (640 ft) tall, but this is now being dismantled. West of Piombino, there is the start of the submarine power cable section to Corsica from HVDC SACOI.

== See also ==
- Atletico Piombino
- Baratti (town)
- La Rocchetta Lighthouse
- Populonia
- Principality of Piombino
