= Scarlino =

- Comune
- Comune di Scarlino
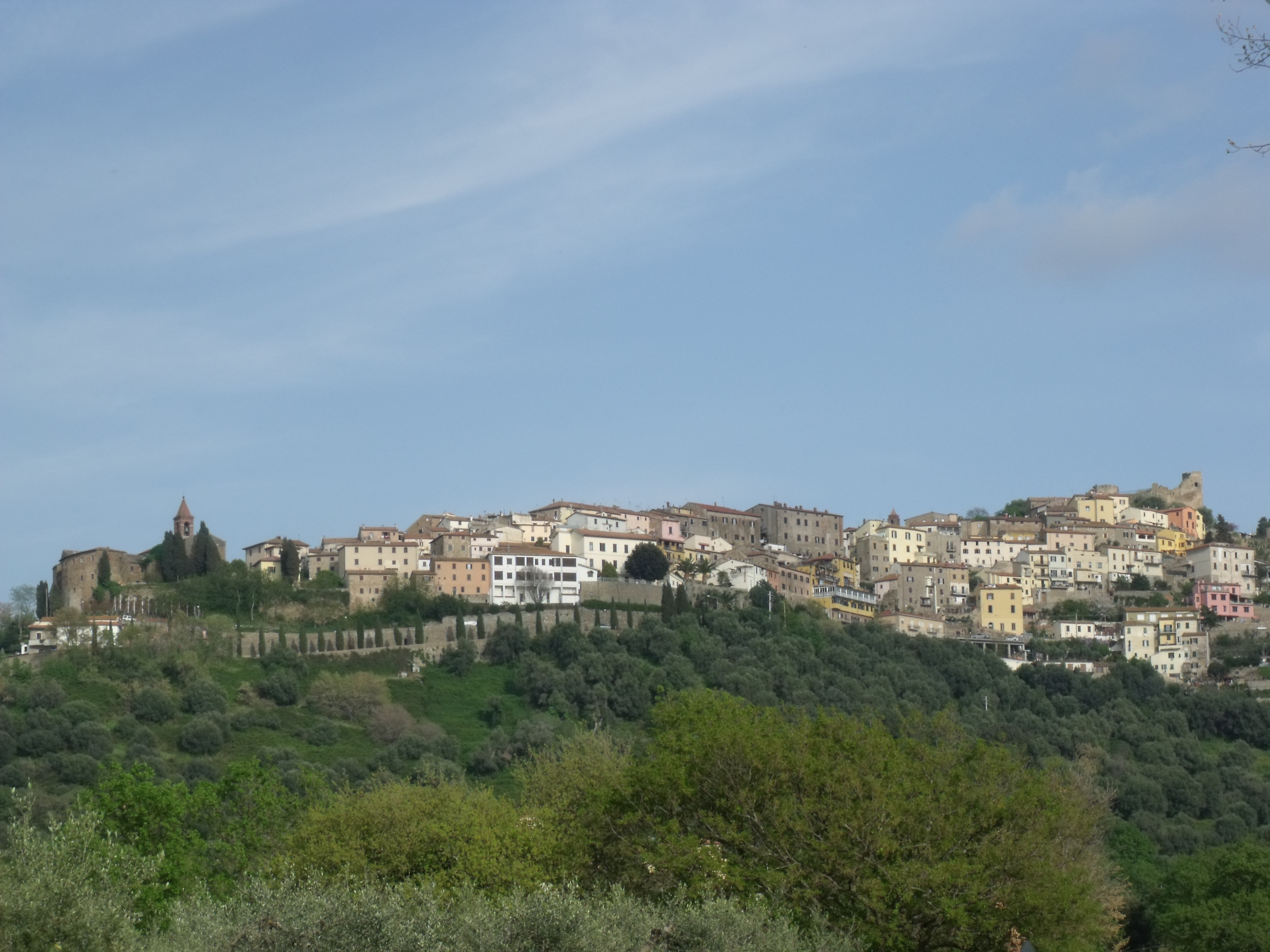

- Coat of arms

- Location within Italy Location within Tuscany
- Coordinates: 42°54′N 10°51′E
- Country: Italy
- Region: Tuscany
- Province: Grosseto (GR)
- Frazioni: Pian d'Alma, Puntone di Scarlino, Scarlino Scalo

Government
  - Mayor: Francesca Travison

Area
  - Total: 88.29 km^{2} (34.09 sq mi)
- Elevation: 229 m (751 ft)

Population (30 November 2016)
  - Total: 3,484
  - Density: 39.46/km^{2} (102.2/sq mi)
- Demonym: Scarlinesi
- Time zone: UTC+1 (CET)
  - Summer (DST): UTC+2 (CEST)
- Postal code: 58020
- Dialing code: 0566
- Patron saint: St. Martin
- Saint day: November 11
- Website: Official website

Scarlino is a comune (municipality) in the Province of Grosseto in the Italian region Tuscany, located about 100 km (62 mi) southwest of Florence and about 25 km (16 mi) northwest of Grosseto.

Scarlino borders the following municipalities: Castiglione della Pescaia, Follonica, Gavorrano, Massa Marittima.

== History ==
Scarlino appeared before the year 1000 as a possession of the Aldobrandeschi family, and was later handed over to the bishops of Roselle and then the Alberti family. In the 13th century it was acquired again by the Aldobrandeschi, but later it passed to Pisa and then the Appiani of Piombino.

Scarlino remained part of the Principality of Piombino until the early 19th century, when it became part of the Grand Duchy of Tuscany. In 1834, Scarlino became a frazione of Gavorrano. In 1960, it regained its status as a municipality.

== Villages ==
The municipality is formed by the municipal seat of Scarlino and the villages (frazioni) of Pian d'Alma, Puntone di Scarlino and Scarlino Scalo.

== List of mayors ==
Mayor	Term start	Term end	Party
Alduvinca Meozzi	1995	2004	Independent (centre-left)
Maurizio Bizzarri	2004	2014	Independent (centre-left)
Marcello Stella	2014	2019	Independent (centre-left)
Francesca Travison	2019	Incumbent	Civic

== Transportation ==
- Scarlino railway station
