= Bagno di Gavorrano =

- Frazione
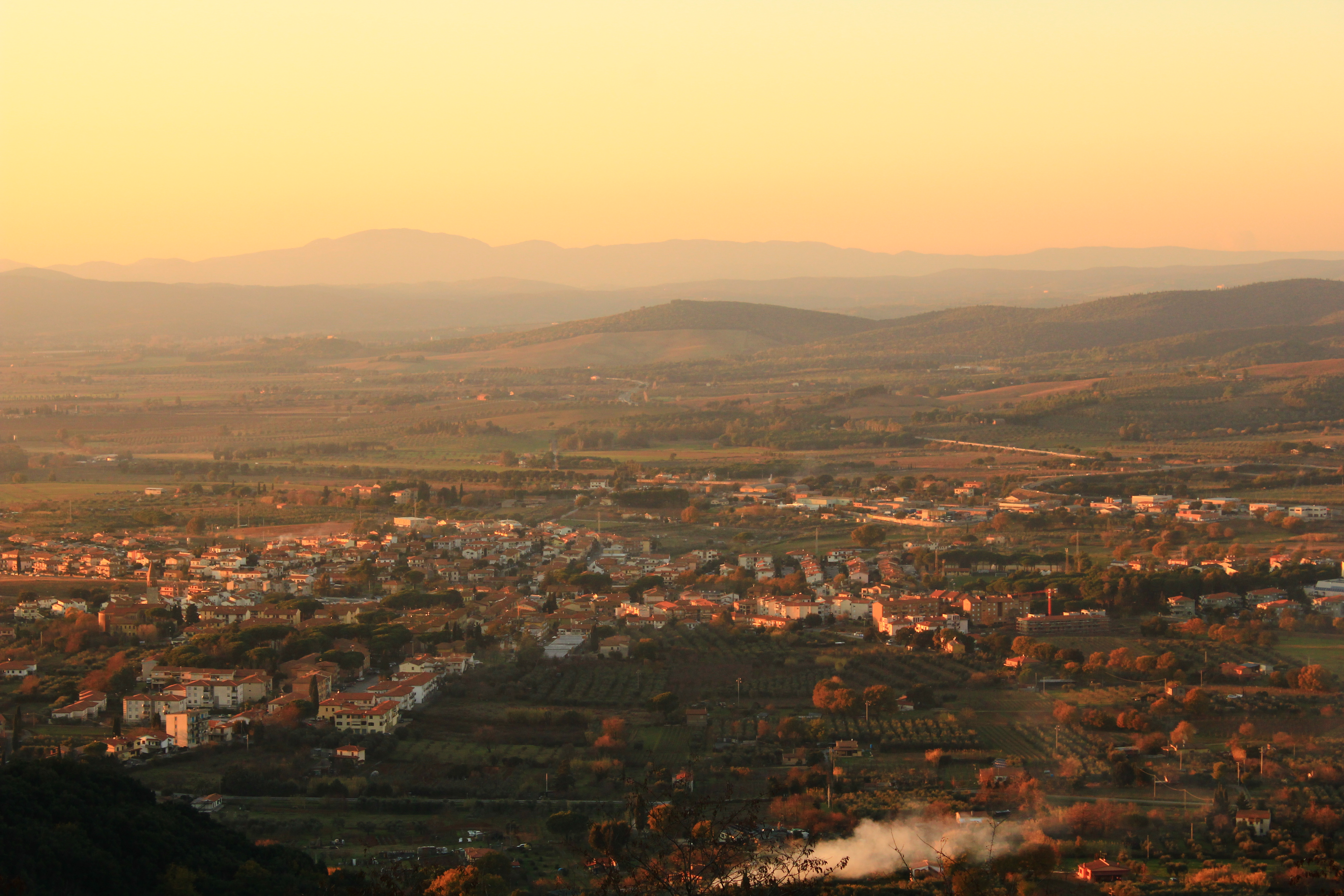
- View of Bagno di Gavorrano

- Location of Bagno di Gavorrano in Italy
- Coordinates: 42°56′22″N 10°53′18″E
- Country: Italy
- Region: Tuscany
- Province: Grosseto (GR)
- Comune: Gavorrano
- Elevation: 40 m (130 ft)

Population (2011)
  - Total: 3,451
- Demonym: Bagnesi
- Time zone: UTC+1 (CET)
  - Summer (DST): UTC+2 (CEST)
- Postal code: 58023

Bagno di Gavorrano is a small town in Tuscany, central Italy, administratively a frazione of the comune of Gavorrano, province of Grosseto. At the time of the 2001 census its population amounted to 3,022.

== Geography ==
Bagno is about 35 km from Grosseto and 3 km from Gavorrano, and it is situated in the plain below the hill of Monte d'Alma, next to the Via Aurelia highway. Bagno, which means bath, was a thermal village until the 1950s.

== Main sights ==
- San Giuseppe Lavoratore (20th century), main parish church of the village, it was designed by engineer Ernesto Ganelli and consecrated in 1957.

== Sports ==
The Stadio Romeo Malservisi, which hosts the games of local soccer team U.S. Gavorrano, is situated in Bagno.

== Bibliography ==
- Bernardino Lotti, La sorgente termale del Bagno di Gavorrano in provincia di Grosseto, Bollettino del R. Ufficio Geologico d'Italia, Vol.LVI n.4, Roma, 1931.

== See also ==
- Caldana
- Castellaccia
- Filare
- Giuncarico
- Grilli, Gavorrano
- Potassa, Gavorrano
- Ravi, Gavorrano
