= Macchiascandona =

- Frazione
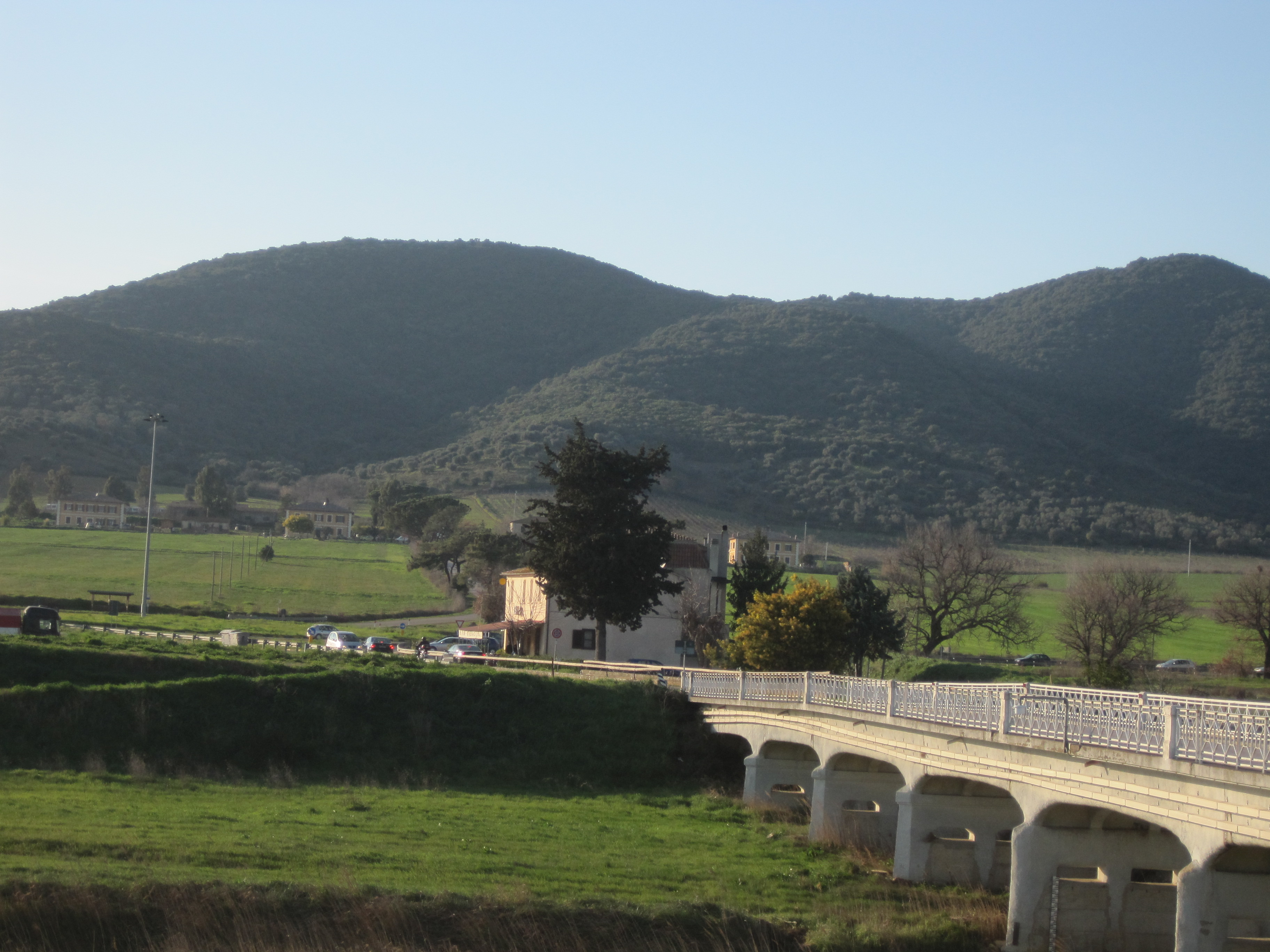

- Location of Macchiascandona in Italy
- Coordinates: 42°48′10″N 10°59′24″E
- Country: Italy
- Region: Tuscany
- Province: Grosseto (GR)
- Comune: Castiglione della Pescaia
- Elevation: 32 m (105 ft)

Population (2011)
  - Total: 29
- Time zone: UTC+1 (CET)
  - Summer (DST): UTC+2 (CEST)
- Postal code: 58043
- Dialing code: (+39) 0564

Macchiascandona (also known as Le Palazzine) is a hamlet in the municipality of Castiglione della Pescaia, province of Grosseto, in Tuscany, central Italy.

The hamlet is located near the eastern edge of the municipality, at the foot of Poggio Ballone and along the Bruna River, which also marks the border with Grosseto. Significant hydraulic reclamation projects between the 19th and 20th centuries have shaped the area's landscape. Macchiascandona is bordered to the east by the drainage canal, which runs parallel to the river's right embankment, while the Sovata stream joins the Bruna just north of the village. The area is known for producing olive oil and sunflowers, as well as for breeding Maremma cattle and horses.

== History ==
Macchiascandona stands in a territory once inhabited by the Etruscans and Romans, on the northern shores of the now-vanished Lake Prile. Numerous ancient Etruscan and Roman artifacts have been discovered throughout the area.

For a long time, the land remained uninhabited due to harsh environmental conditions caused by the marshland of Lake Prile and the spread of malaria. The first hydraulic reclamation works were initiated in the first half of the 19th century under the orders of Grand Duke Leopold II, who began the land reclamation of the Grosseto plain through sediment deposition. In 1844, the Macchiascandona drainage canal was built to channel clear waters from the reclaimed land. In 1852, work began on reshaping the Bruna River's course to make it flow parallel to the drainage canal. These reclamation efforts continued during the Kingdom of Italy under the direction of engineer Alfredo Baccarini, first head of Grosseto's Civil Engineering Department and later Minister of Public Works.

Macchiascandona's reclamation was finally completed during the Fascist era. In the late 1920s, the Bruna's embankments were definitively reinforced, a road connecting to Montepescali was built, and the modern Macchiascandona bridge was constructed. Most notably, a "workers' village" was inaugurated for laborers involved in the construction of the riverbanks and riverbed, as part of Minister Giovanni Giuriati's national initiative for the development of new agricultural settlements.

== Education ==
Macchiascandona hosts the educational farm of the "Leopoldo II di Lorena" Agricultural Technical Institute of Grosseto. The farm covers 85 hectares, including 40 ha of arable land, 20 ha of olive groves (with about 2,000 trees), and 4 ha of vineyards. The facilities include storage buildings, laboratories for the production of wine, oil, and flour, and educational spaces. It also features an olive collection in collaboration with the National Research Council.

A 1.5 km nature trail, equipped with informational panels, allows visitors to explore the local flora and fauna, benefiting from the farm's proximity to the Diaccia Botrona Nature Reserve.

== See also ==
- Buriano, Castiglione della Pescaia
- Braccagni
- Giuncarico
- Grilli, Gavorrano
- Vetulonia
