= Baldassare Peruzzi =

Italian architect and painter

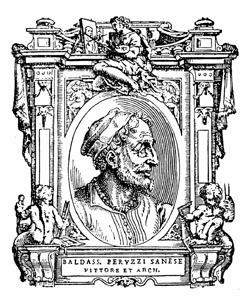
- Portrait of Baldassare Peruzzi from Lives of the Most Excellent Painters, Sculptors, and Architects by Giorgio Vasari, edition of 1568.
- Born: Baldassare Tommaso Peruzzi; 7 March 1481; Siena, Republic of Siena
- Died: 6 January 1536 (aged 54); Rome, Papal States
- Known for: Painting, Architecture
- Notable work: Decoration of Villa Farnesina; Palazzo Massimo alle Colonne
- Movement: High Renaissance; Mannerism

Baldassare Tommaso Peruzzi (7 March 1481 – 6 January 1536) was an Italian architect and painter, born in a small town near Siena (in Ancaiano, frazione of Sovicille) and died in Rome. He worked for many years with Bramante, Raphael, and later Sangallo during the erection of the new St. Peter's. He returned to his native Siena after the Sack of Rome (1527) where he was employed as architect to the Republic. For the Sienese he built new fortifications for the city and designed (though did not build) a remarkable dam on the Bruna River near Giuncarico. He seems to have moved back to Rome permanently by 1535. He died there the following year and was buried in the Rotunda of the Pantheon, near Raphael.

He was a painter of frescoes in the Cappella San Giovanni (Chapel of St John the Baptist) in the Duomo of Siena.

His son Giovanni Sallustio was also an architect. Another son, Onorio, learned painting from his father, then became a Dominican priest in the convent of Santa Maria Sopra Minerva in Rome. He then stopped painting until requested by his superiors at San Romano di Lucca to paint the organ doors of the church.

== Design and decoration of Villa Farnesina ==
Almost all art critics ascribe the design of the Villa Chigi in Rome, now known more commonly as the Villa Farnesina, to Peruzzi. In this villa, two wings branch off from a central hall with a simple arrangement of pilasters, and a decorative frieze on the exterior of the building . Some of the frescoed paintings which adorn the interior rooms are by Peruzzi. One example is the Sala delle Prospettive, in which Peruzzi revived the perspective schemes of Melozzo da Forlì and Mantegna, possibly under the influence of both. The walls of the room are painted so that when one stands toward the left, one has the illusion that one is standing in an open-air terrace, lined by pillars, looking out over a continuous landscape. The decoration of the façade, the work of Peruzzi, has almost entirely vanished, but it is documented by an anonymous French artist in a drawing, now held by the New York Metropolitan Museum of Art . To decorate this villa on the Tiber many artists were employed, and just as the style of the villa in no wise recalls the old castellated type of country-house, so the paintings in harmony with the pleasure-loving spirits of the time were thoroughly antique and uninspired by Christian ideas. Raphael designed the composition of the story of Amor and Psyche as a continuation of the Galatea. On a plate-glass vault Peruzzi painted the firmament, with the zodiacal signs, the planets, and other heavenly bodies. The interior room has a striking use of illusionistic perspective .

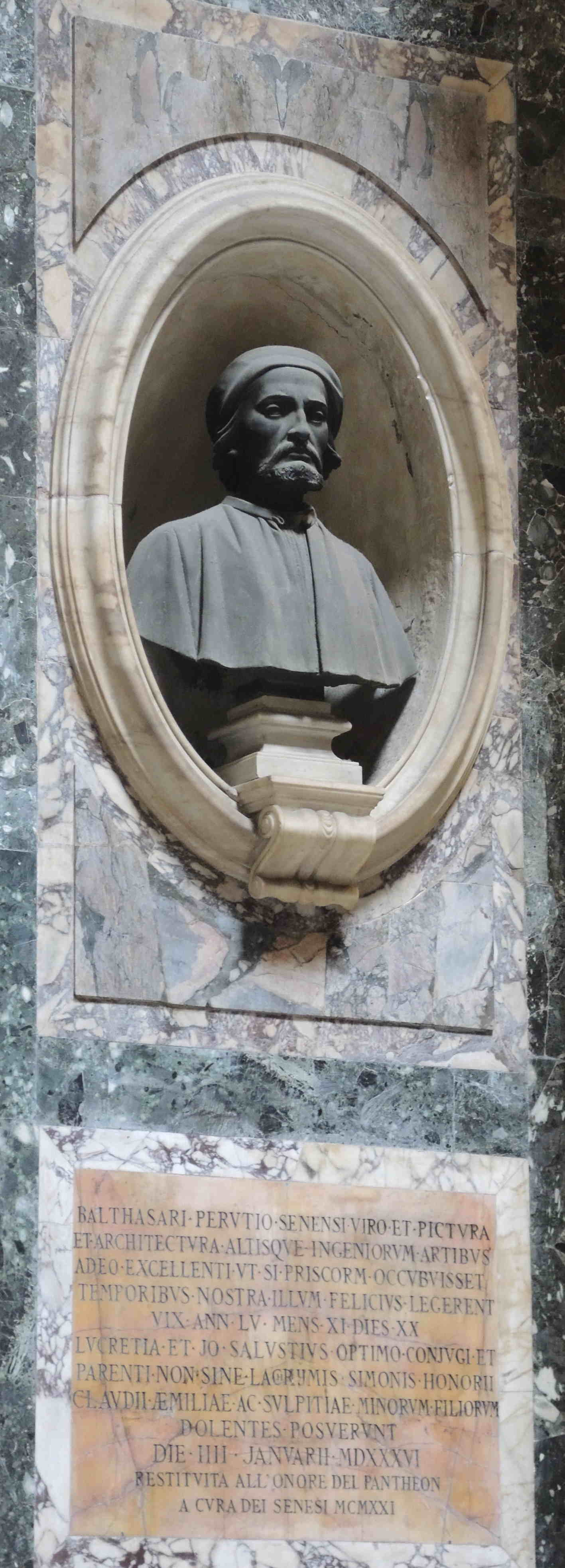
Bust and Epitaph in the Rotunda of the Pantheon, Rome, Italy.

== Other work ==
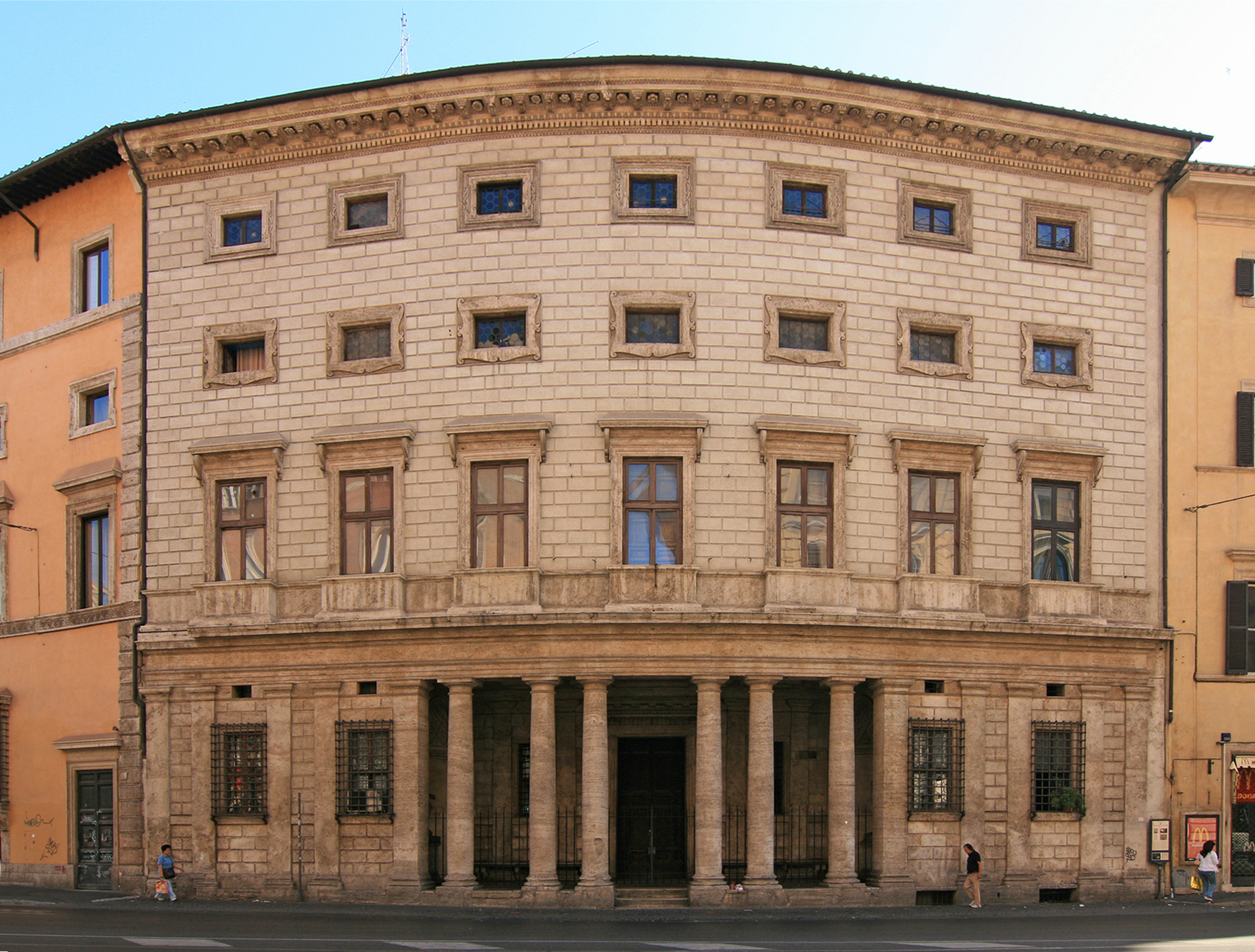
Façade of Palazzo Massimo alle Colonne.

Peruzzi had produced a mosaic ceiling for the church of Santa Croce in Gerusalemme, Rome; the mosaic depicts the Saviour. Other paintings ascribed to him are to be found in Sant'Onofrio and San Pietro in Montorio. That Peruzzi improved as time went on is evident in his later works, e.g., the "Madonna with Saints" in Santa Maria della Pace at Rome, and the fresco of Augustus and the Tiburtine Sibyl in Santa Maria in Portico a Fontegiusta at Siena. As our master interested himself in the decorative art also, he exercised a strong influence in this direction, not only by his own decorative paintings but also by furnishing designs for craftsmen of various kinds. While primarily known as an architect, one of his great loves was drawing. His extraordinary pen and ink drawings for the basilica of St. Peter's are preserved in the Prints and Drawings Collection of the Uffizi Gallery in Florence. He was especially well known for his extraordinary studies of antique buildings, as seen in The Mystic Marriage of Saint Catherine (1502–1503) in the Allen Memorial Art Museum.

His final architectural masterpiece, the Palazzo Massimo alle Colonne (1535) located now on the 19th-century Corso Vittorio Emanuele, is well known for its curving facade, ingenious planning, and architecturally rich interior. The exterior details display a Mannerist-style.

He left drawings to a pupil, Sebastiano Serlio, who used them in several of his Books of Architecture, published in Venice beginning in the early 1530s.
