= Giuncarico railway station =

Railway station in Italy

Giuncarico
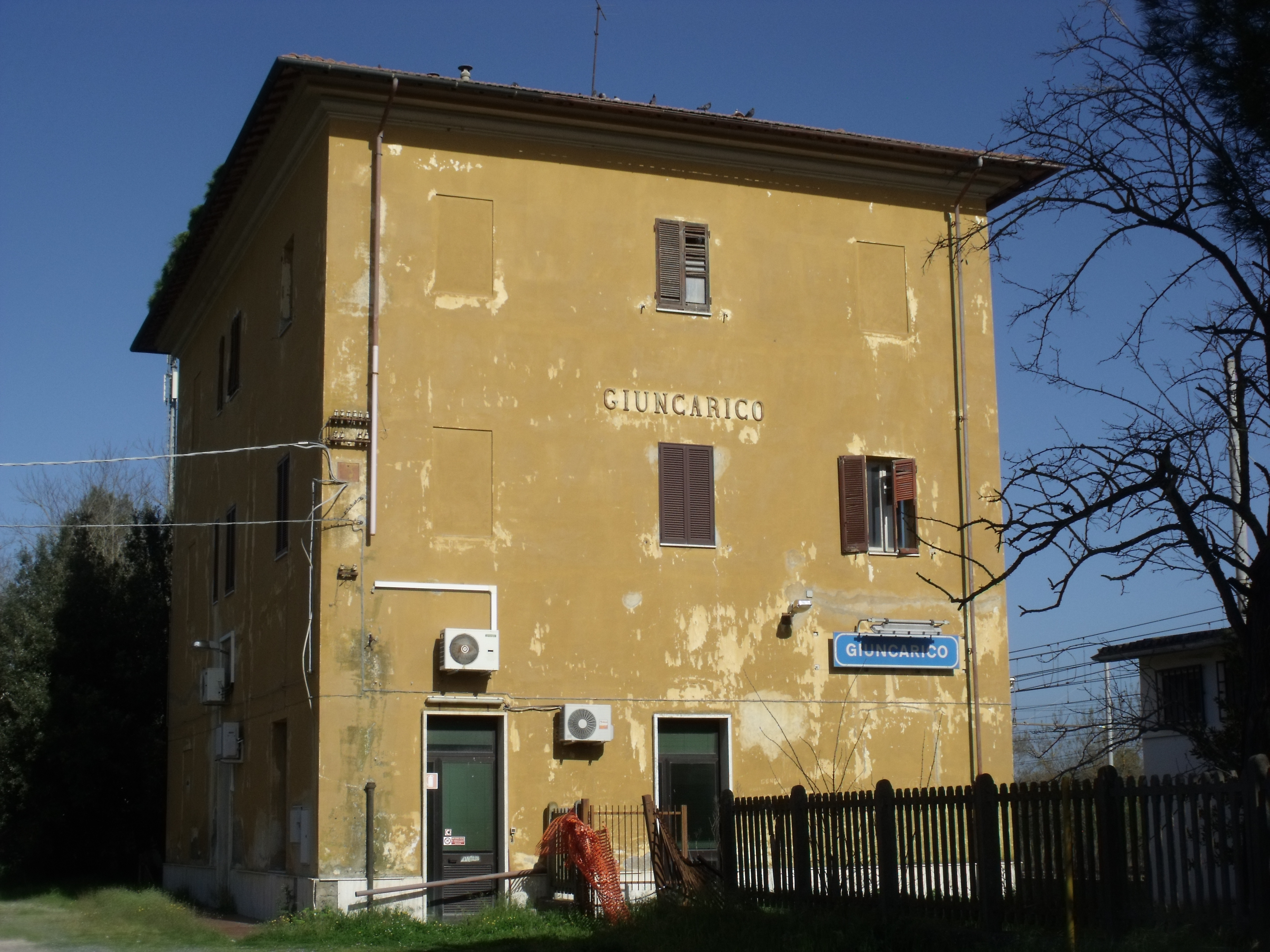

General information
- Location: Via della Stazione; Giuncarico 58023; Gavorrano, Grosseto, Tuscany; Italy
- Coordinates: 42°54′55.1″N 11°00′29.9″E
- Operator: Rete Ferroviaria Italiana; Trenitalia
- Line: Tirrenica

History
- Opened: 15 June 1892; 134 years ago
- Closed: Early 2000s
Location
- Location within Tuscany Location within Italy

Giuncarico railway station is a disused Italian railway station on the Tirrenica railway line, located in Giuncarico, in the municipality of Gavorrano, Province of Grosseto, Tuscany.

== History ==
The station opened on 15 June 1892 as a new railway stop on the Pisa–Rome railway between the stations of Gavorrano and Montepescali.

In the early 2000s, the station was closed due to low passenger traffic.

== See also ==
- History of rail transport in Italy
- List of railway stations in Tuscany
- Rail transport in Italy
- Railway stations in Italy
