= Filare =

- Frazione
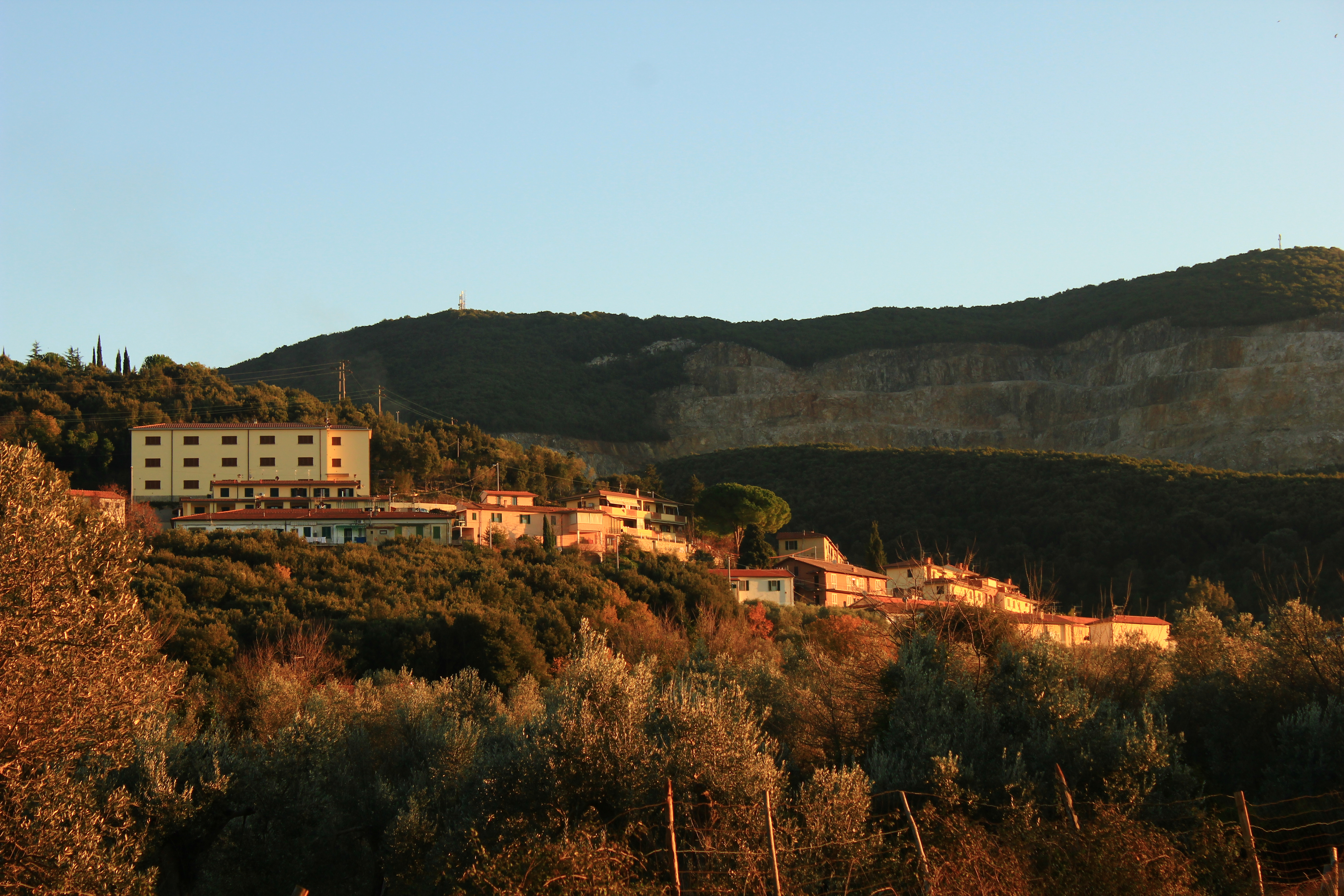
- View of Filare

- Location of Filare in Italy
- Coordinates: 42°55′33″N 10°53′44″E
- Country: Italy
- Region: Tuscany
- Province: Grosseto (GR)
- Comune: Gavorrano
- Elevation: 100 m (330 ft)

Population (2011)
  - Total: 535
- Demonym: Filaresi
- Time zone: UTC+1 (CET)
  - Summer (DST): UTC+2 (CEST)
- Postal code: 58023

Filare is a village in Tuscany, central Italy, administratively a frazione of the comune of Gavorrano, province of Grosseto. At the time of the 2001 census its population amounted to 439.

Filare is about 35 km from Grosseto and 2 km from Gavorrano, and it is situated along the Provincial Road between Gavorrano and the plain of the town of Bagno. The small town was born in the late 19th century with the development of the mining activities.

== Main sights ==
- Montecatini mining village of Filare: buildings – the mansion of the managers of the mine, the workers' houses, the canteen, a chapel – the old mine conduits, the extraction shaft of Pozzo Roma, the San Giovanni drainage gallery.

== Bibliography ==
- Bernardino Lotti, La sorgente termale del Bagno di Gavorrano in provincia di Grosseto, Bollettino del R. Ufficio Geologico d'Italia, Vol.LVI n.4, Roma, 1931.

== See also ==
- Bagno di Gavorrano
- Caldana
- Castellaccia
- Giuncarico
- Grilli, Gavorrano
- Potassa, Gavorrano
- Ravi, Gavorrano
