= Bruna (river) =

River in Grosseto, Tuscany

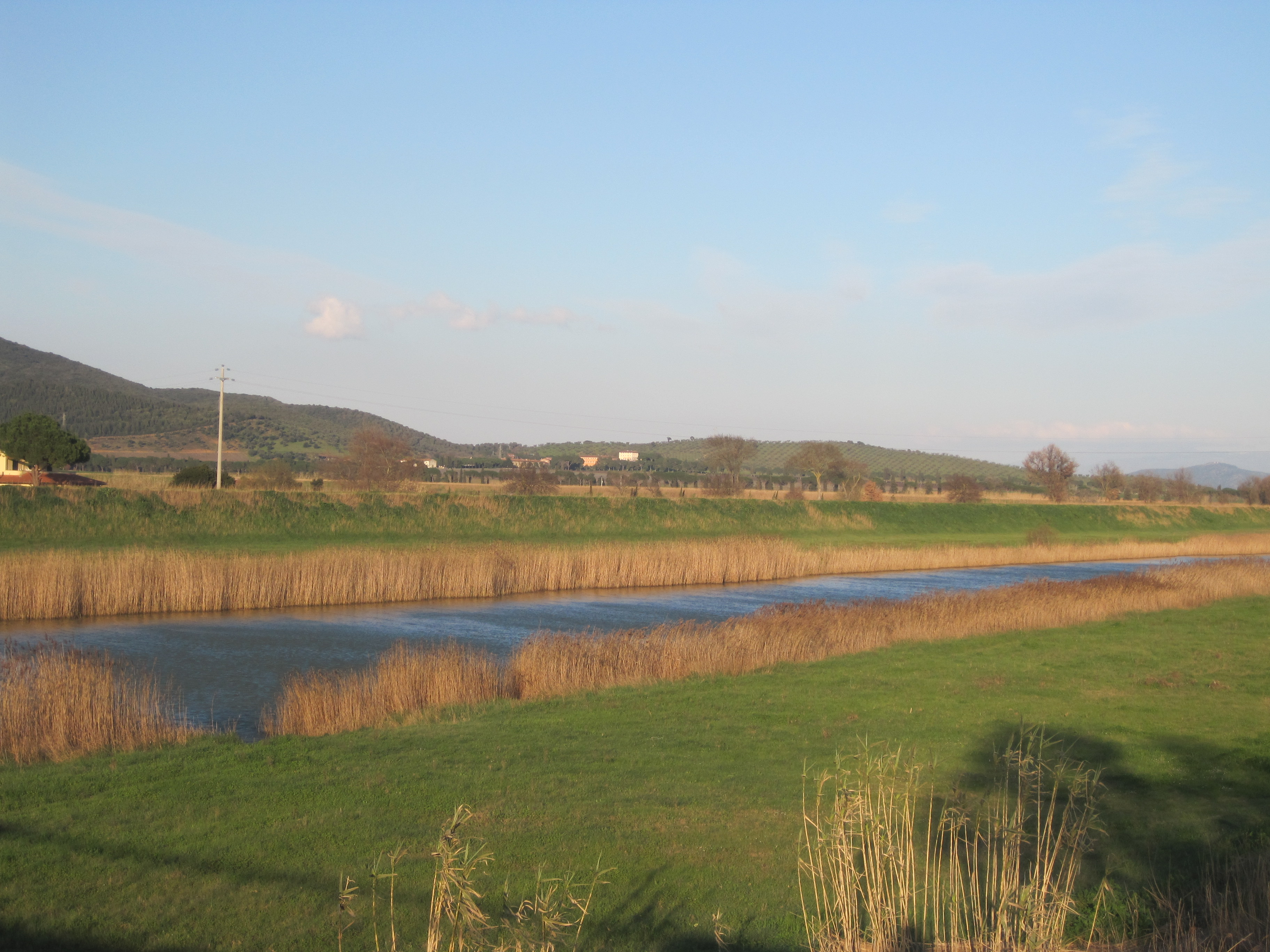
- The Bruna river at Ponti di Badia

- Location of mouth

Location
- Country: Italy
- Region: Tuscany
- Municipalities: Castiglione della Pescaia, Gavorrano, Massa Marittima

Physical characteristics
- Source
  - location: Serre, Forni dell'Accesa, Massa Marittima
  - elevation: approx. 214 m (702 ft) above sea level
- Mouth: Tyrrhenian Sea
  - location: Castiglione della Pescaia
  - coordinates: 42.7606°N 10.8777°E
- Length: 42 km (26 mi)
- Basin size: 441 km^{2} (170 sq mi)
- Discharge
  - average: 6.8 m^{3}/s (240 cu ft/s)

The Bruna is a river of about 42 km in the northern part of the province of Grosseto, Tuscany, Italy.

Its sources are located in the Metalliferous Hills just south of Massa Marittima. The river initially flows east, forming the Lake Accesa, and receives several small left-bank tributaries before turning south as it enters the northern Grosseto plain near the villages of Castellaccia and Giuncarico in the municipality of Gavorrano.

After passing the settlement of Macchiascandona, the river curves southwest bordering the Diaccia Botrona wetland. It continues to Castiglione della Pescaia, where it flows under the Giorgini Bridge and empties into the Tyrrhenian Sea. The port of Castiglione della Pescaia is located at its mouth.
