= Potassa, Gavorrano =

Potassa
- Frazione
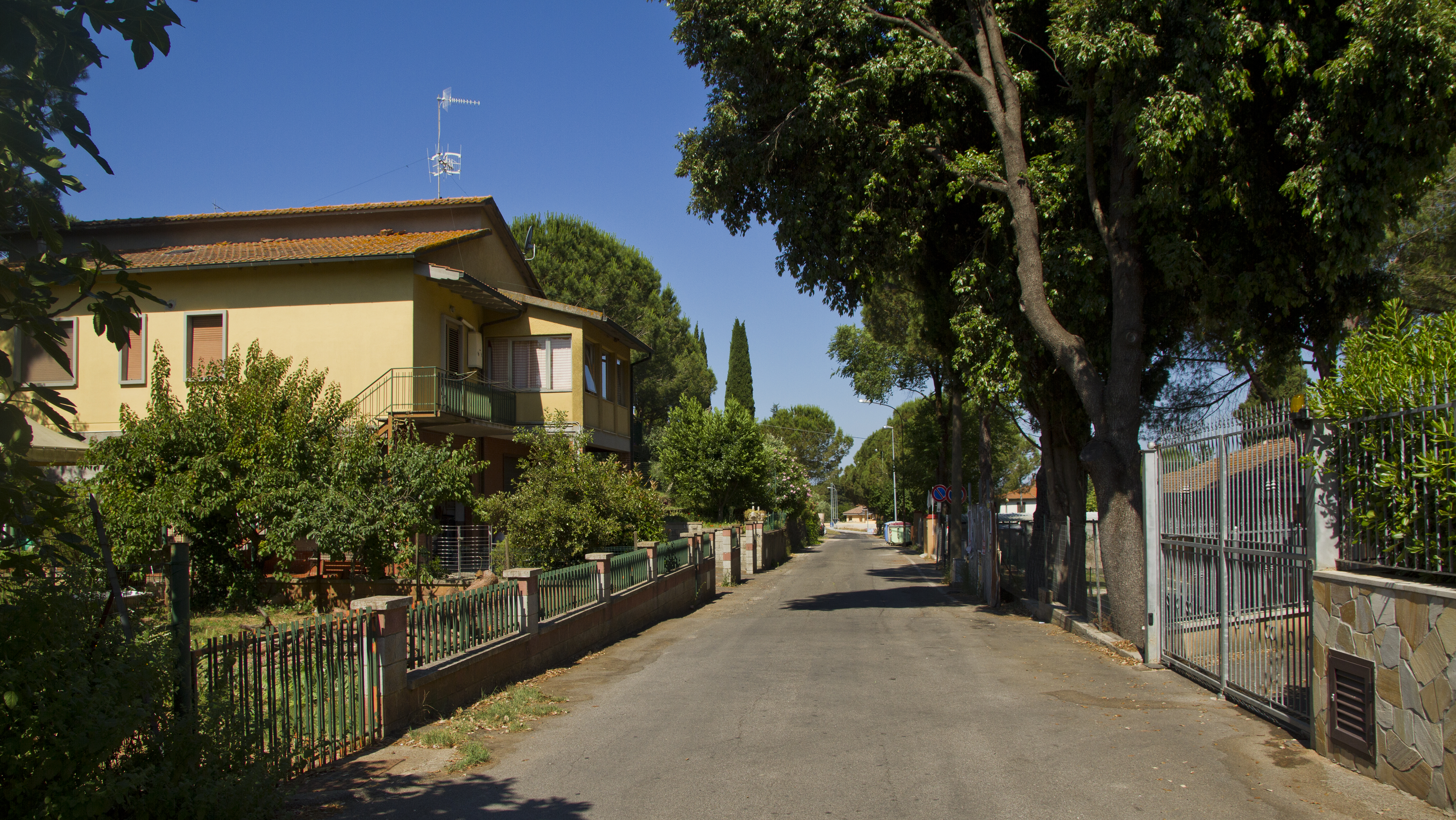

- Location of Potassa in Italy
- Coordinates: 42°56′55″N 10°55′39″E
- Country: Italy
- Region: Tuscany
- Province: Grosseto (GR)
- Comune: Gavorrano
- Elevation: 70 m (230 ft)

Population (2011)
  - Total: 208
- Time zone: UTC+1 (CET)
  - Summer (DST): UTC+2 (CEST)

Potassa is a village in Tuscany, central Italy, administratively a frazione of the comune of Gavorrano, province of Grosseto. At the time of the 2001 census its population amounted to 160.

== Geography ==
Potassa is about 30 km from Grosseto and 7 km from Gavorrano, and it is situated in a plain at the foot of the hills of Monte Calvo and Poggio Moscatello, down the ravine Sovata.

== History ==
Potassa was born in the 19th century as an industrial centre related to the mines of Gavorrano. Its name comes from potassium carbonate (potassa in Italian).

== Transportation ==
The village is positioned along the Via Aurelia highway and easily reached from the Tirrenica railway line thanks to its own station, as the main railway station of the comune — for this reason, Potassa is also known as Gavorrano Scalo ("scalo" means "station").

== See also ==
- Caldana
- Castellaccia
- Filare
- Giuncarico
- Grilli, Gavorrano
- Ravi, Gavorrano
