= Castellaccia =

- Frazione
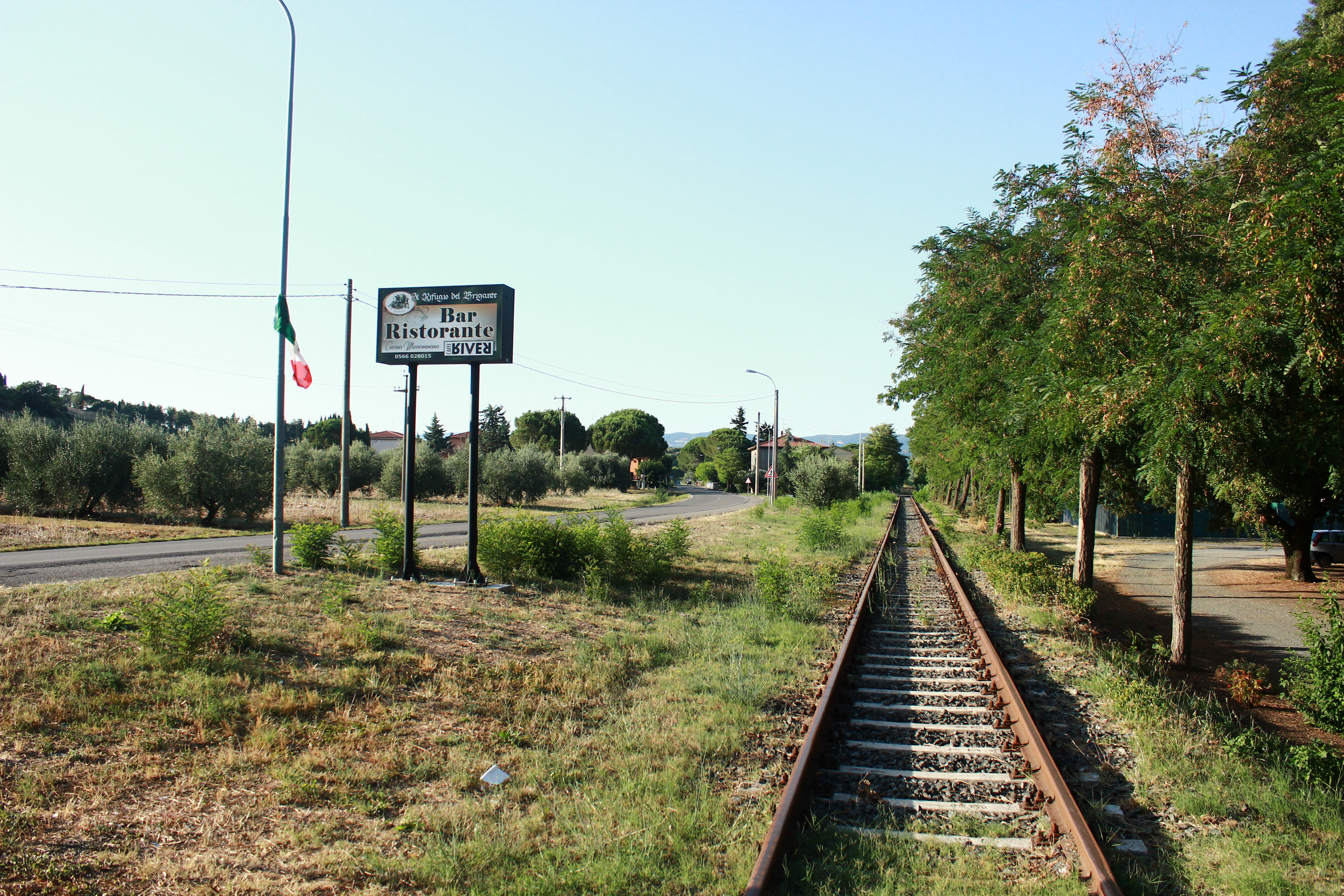
- The former railway in Castellaccia

- Location of Castellaccia in Italy
- Coordinates: 42°55′23″N 11°1′34″E
- Country: Italy
- Region: Tuscany
- Province: Grosseto (GR)
- Comune: Gavorrano
- Elevation: 24 m (79 ft)

Population (2011)
  - Total: 101
- Time zone: UTC+1 (CET)
  - Summer (DST): UTC+2 (CEST)
- Postal code: 58023

Castellaccia is a village in Tuscany, central Italy, administratively a frazione of the comune of Gavorrano, province of Grosseto. At the time of the 2001 census its population amounted to 79.

Castellaccia is about 22 km from Grosseto and 15 km from Gavorrano, and it is situated in the plain below the hill of Giuncarico, along the road to the town of Ribolla. The centre of the village is the court of the old Farm of Castellaccia.

== Main sights ==
- Chapel of Sant'Oliva, little church situated next to the main villa of the old farm.
- Villa Benini, manor house of the Farm of Castellaccia, it was restructured in 1910.
- Poggio Pelliccia: located in the countryside near the village, it's an ancient archeological site with a monumental Etruscan tomb, dating back to the 7th century BC, probably burial of an aristocratic family from the nearby Vetulonia.
- Rocca di Frassinello

== Transport ==
The village is crossed by the Giuncarico-Ribolla railway line, now closed and used only for the transportation of gravel from the quarry of Bartolina.

== Bibliography ==
- Bruno Santi, Guida storico-artistica alla Maremma. Itinerari culturali nella provincia di Grosseto, Siena, Nuova Immagine, 1995.

== See also ==
- Bagno di Gavorrano
- Caldana, Gavorrano
- Filare
- Giuncarico
- Grilli, Gavorrano
- Potassa, Gavorrano
- Ravi, Gavorrano
