= Stadio Romeo Malservisi =

Football stadium in Bagno di Gavorrano, Italy

Coordinates: 42°56′28.3″N 10°53′21.4″E

Stadio Malservisi Matteini
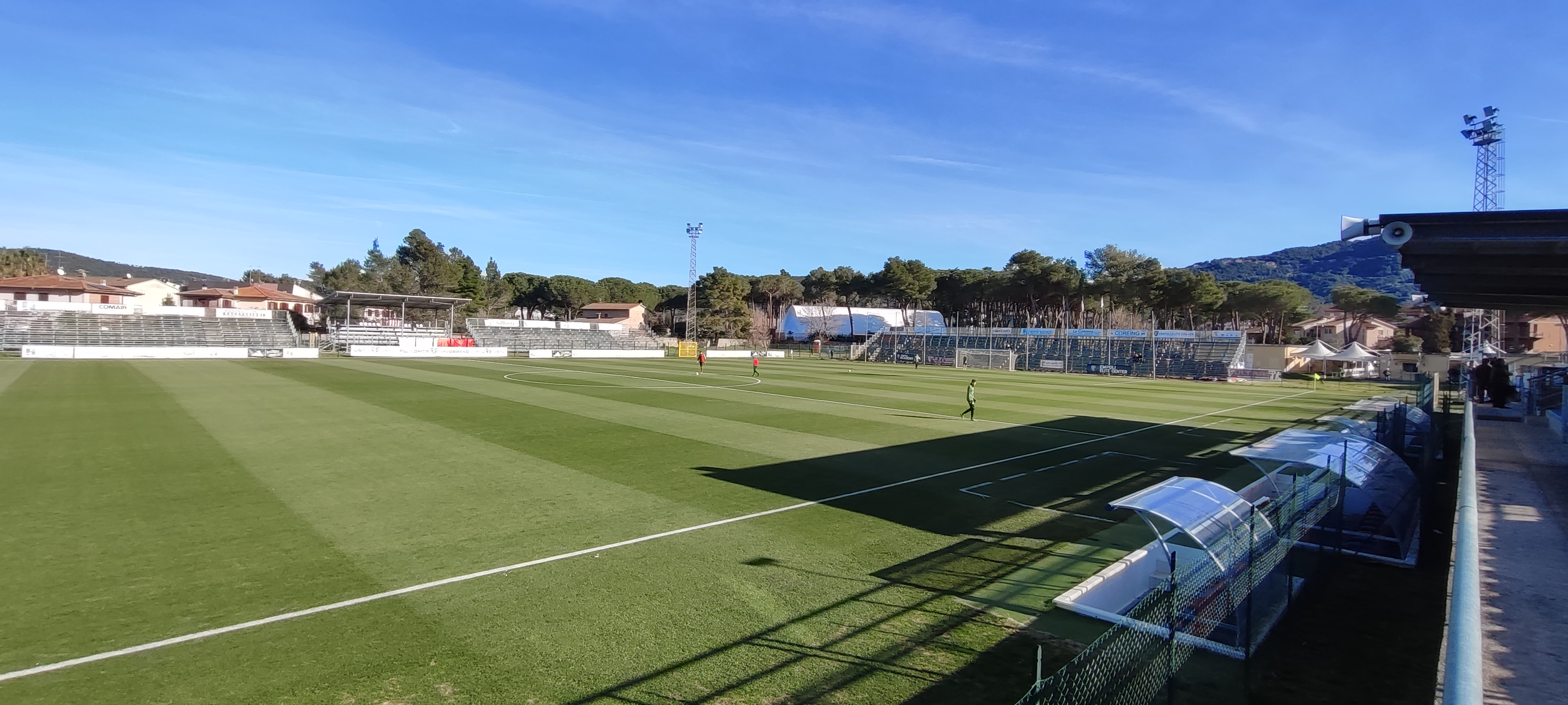
- Interactive map of Stadio Malservisi Matteini
- Location: Bagno di Gavorrano, Italy
- Owner: Comune of Gavorrano
- Capacity: 2,000
- Surface: Grass

Construction
- Opened: 1967
- Renovated: 2010

Tenant
- U.S. Gavorrano

Stadio Romeo Malservisi is a multi-purpose stadium in Gavorrano, Italy. It is currently used mostly for football matches and is the home ground of U.S. Gavorrano. The stadium holds 2,000.
