= Grilli, Gavorrano =

Grilli
- Frazione
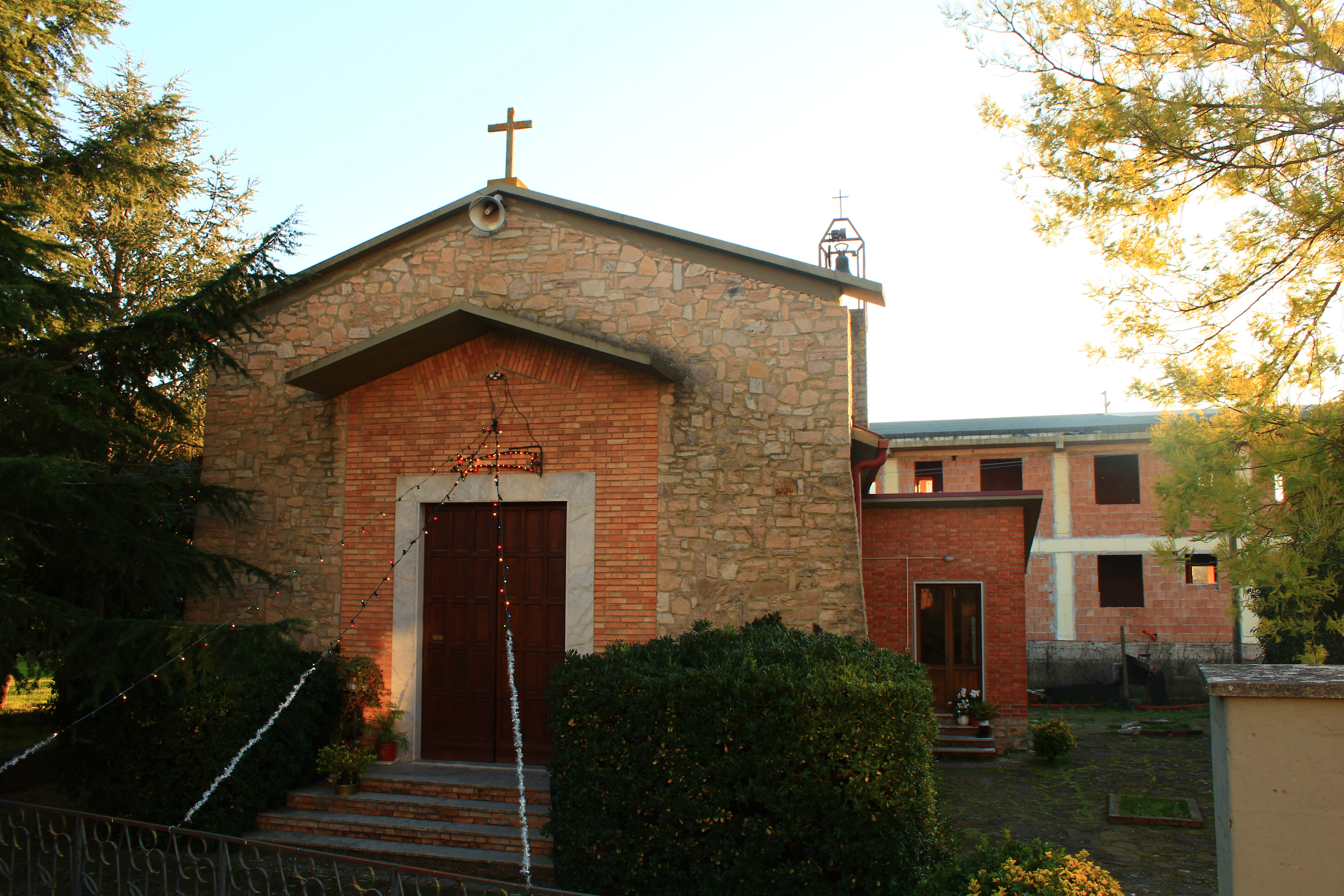
- The church of Saint Rita

- Location of Grilli in Italy
- Coordinates: 42°53′18″N 10°58′41″E
- Country: Italy
- Region: Tuscany
- Province: Grosseto (GR)
- Comune: Gavorrano
- Elevation: 20 m (66 ft)

Population (2011)
  - Total: 252
- Demonym: Grillesi
- Time zone: UTC+1 (CET)
  - Summer (DST): UTC+2 (CEST)
- Postal code: 58023

Grilli is a village in Tuscany, central Italy, administratively a frazione of the municipality of Gavorrano, province of Grosseto. At the time of the 2001 census its population amounted to 268.

Grilli is located about 25 km from Grosseto and 10 km from Gavorrano, situated on a plain between the hills of Giuncarico, Caldana, and Vetulonia. The village originated in the 19th century as a centre for artisanal pasta production.

== Geography ==
The village is located in the southeastern extremity of the municipality of Gavorrano, near the border with Castiglione della Pescaia. It lies on a plain along the old Via Aurelia, roughly midway between the hilltop villages of Giuncarico to the east, Caldana to the west, and Vetulonia to the south. The settlement is bordered by the Rigo di Colonna stream, which flows into the Sovata slightly to the east.

== History ==
The village developed in the mid-19th century on a plain at the centre of several agricultural estates, including Lupo and Vacchereccia. It was the site of the "Grilli" pasta factory, a significant local enterprise that contributed to the growth of the settlement and influenced its toponym. The village church was constructed in 1969.

== Main sights ==
=== Church of Saint Rita ===
The church of Saint Rita of Cascia (Santa Rita da Cascia) is the main place of worship in the village. It is a modern building with a gabled façade and was consecrated on 11 October 1969 by Bishop Primo Gasbarri. The church belongs to the parish of San Biagio in Caldana.

=== Lupo Farm ===
The Farm of Lupo, located along the old route between Grilli and Giuncarico, dates to the mid-19th century. The manor house was expanded in the early 20th century with the addition of a three-storey tower at the northwest corner, featuring floral decorative bands. The estate also retains the original cistern and two farmhouses of similar design. Nearby stands the hydraulic control station (casello idraulico), built in 1904 to manage the waters of the Sovata stream during land reclamation works.

== Education ==
In Grilli, public education is administered by the "Falcone and Borsellino" Institute of Gavorrano, and the village maintains a nursery school for early childhood education.

== Sources ==
- Tacconi, Adelmo (1969). "La chiesa di S. Rita da Cascia in località Grilli". Rivista diocesana della Diocesi di Grosseto e Abbazia delle Tre Fontane in Toscana. Vol. IV, no. 11.
- Guerrini, Giuseppe (1996). La Diocesi di Grosseto. Parrocchie, chiese e altri luoghi di culto, dalle origini ai nostri giorni. Roccastrada: Il mio amico.

== See also ==
- Bagno di Gavorrano
- Caldana, Gavorrano
- Castellaccia
- Filare
- Giuncarico
- Potassa, Gavorrano
- Ravi, Gavorrano
