= Rocca di Frassinello =

Winery designed by Renzo Piano in Gavorrano, Italy

- Interactive map of the Rocca di Frassinello area

General information
- Type: Winery
- Location: Località Poggio alla Guardia 1 Gavorrano, Tuscany, Italy
- Coordinates: 42°55′53.46″N 10°58′48.29″E
- Construction started: 2003
- Completed: 2007
- Inaugurated: 30 June 2007; 18 years ago
- Client: Paolo Panerai
- Owner: Paolo Panerai

Design and construction
- Architect: Renzo Piano

Website
- Official website

Rocca di Frassinello is a contemporary-style winery located in the municipality of Gavorrano, in the province of Grosseto, Tuscany. The structure, designed by Renzo Piano and home to the eponymous winemaking company, is part of the Toscana Wine Architecture circuit of design wineries and is considered one of Italy's "cathedrals of wine". Inside, it also houses the Etruscan museum of Gavorrano.

The winery is located on the hill of Poggio alla Guardia, not far from the village of Castellaccia and the route of the Variante Aurelia highway.

== History ==
The winery was created at the behest of Paolo Panerai's Domini Castellare, who had purchased 500 hectares of land between Gavorrano and Roccastrada, with the intention of replicating in Maremma the entrepreneurial experience he had started in Castellina in Chianti in 1979. The Rocca di Frassinello winemaking company was founded through an Italian-French joint venture between Paolo Panerai's Domini Castellare and Baron Éric de Rothschild's Domaines Barons de Rothschild Lafite. The design of the winery was entrusted to architect Renzo Piano in 2001, and construction began in 2003.

The official inauguration took place on 30 June 2007.

Since 1 November 2018, the winery has also hosted the Etruscan Documentation Center of Gavorrano, born from the collaboration between the Panerai ownership, the Superintendence of Archaeology of Tuscany, the University of Florence, and the municipal administration of Gavorrano. The museum is part of the provincial museum network "Musei di Maremma".

== Description ==
In Piano's vision, the silhouette of the structure is designed to evoke the appearance of the Maremma fortresses (the Aldobrandeschi strongholds) towering over the hillside, complete with a tower. The winery is characterized by its linear profiles and a large open-air terrace, featuring a representative space covered by a light metal canopy. All above-ground structures, except for the metal roof, are coated in red plaster, reminiscent of the color of brick.

A noteworthy feature is the internal and subterranean room, a cave excavated into the hillside, which houses the barriques: a grand amphitheater with barrels placed on its steps, positioning the visitor at the center of the scene.

Within the winery, the painting "Rapture of the Grape", created in 2014 by artist David LaChapelle following a stay at the estate the previous year, is displayed.

=== The Etruscan museum ===
Following the discovery of Etruscan tombs within the Rocca di Frassinello estate, a collaboration began between the estate's owner Panerai, the archaeological superintendent, and the University of Florence for the excavation of the San Germano necropolis. During the excavations, eleven tombs were unearthed. The burial mounds yielded numerous artifacts, including jars with residues of tartaric acid, indicating the presence of wine. Consequently, in 2015, an archaeological exhibition was set up within the winery, designed by architect Italo Rota, with scientific direction by Biancamaria Aranguren and Luca Cappuccini, titled "Gli Etruschi e il vino a Rocca di Frassinello" ("The Etruscans and Wine at Rocca di Frassinello") which was inaugurated on 30 May 2015. The following year, the exhibition was expanded and renamed "Vino e lusso degli Etruschi di San Germano" ("Wine and Luxury of the Etruscans from San Germano").

The positive outcome of the temporary exhibitions and the ongoing discoveries, which continued to bring new burial mounds and grave goods to light, led to the idea of establishing a permanent documentation center for the Gavorrano municipality. Thus, the Rocca di Frassinello Etruscan Documentation Center was inaugurated on 1 November 2018.

== Sources ==
- "Renzo Piano Building Workshop: Cantine Panerai La Rocca, Gavorrano (Grosseto)". L'Arca (231): 12–17. 2007.
- "Renzo Piano Building Workshop: La Rocca Winery". A+U: Architecture and Urbanism (457): 88–96. October 2008.
- Andrea Aleardi; Corrado Marcetti, eds. (2011). L'architettura in Toscana dal 1945 a oggi. Una guida alla selezione delle opere di rilevante interesse storico-artistico. Florence: Alinea Editrice.
- Barbara Catalani; Marco Del Francia; Giovanni Tombari (2011). Itinerari di architettura contemporanea. Grosseto e provincia. Pisa: ETS.
- Francesca Chiorino (2007). "Renzo Piano: cantina vinicola Rocca di Frassinello, Gavorrano, Grosseto". Casabella. 71 (759).
- Francesca Chiorino (2011). Cantine secolo XXI. Architetture e paesaggi del vino. Milan: Electa.
- Saurabh Kumar Dixit, ed. (2019). The Routledge Handbook of Gastronomic Tourism. Taylor & Francis.
- Igor Maglica (2007). "Renzo Piano Building Workshop, Cantine La Rocca di Frassinello a Gavorrano (Grosseto)". Costruire in Laterizio (120).
- Antonella Marino; Maria Vinella (2018). Coltivare l'arte. Educazione natura agricoltura. Milan: FrancoAngeli.
- Luca Molinari; Giovanni Bietti. Cantine da collezione. Itinerari di architettura contemporanea nel paesaggio italiano. Florence: Forma.
- Veronica Pirazzini (2008). Cantine. Milan: Motta Architettura.
