= Gavorrano =

- Comune
- Comune di Gavorrano
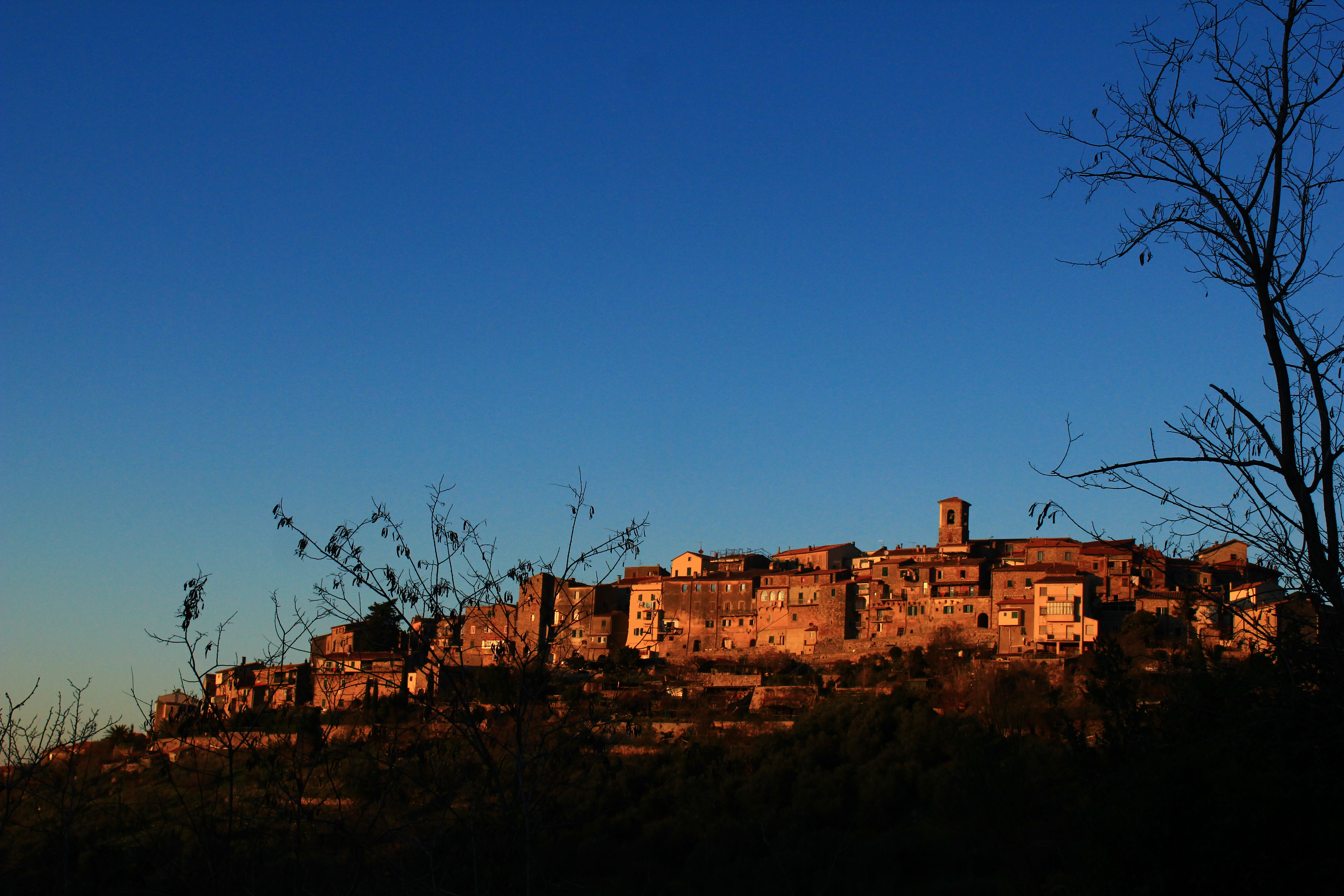

- Coat of arms

- Location within Italy Location within Tuscany
- Coordinates: 42°55′30″N 10°54′36″E
- Country: Italy
- Region: Tuscany
- Province: Grosseto (GR)
- Frazioni: Bagno di Gavorrano, Caldana, Castellaccia, Filare, Giuncarico, Grilli, Potassa, Ravi

Government
  - Mayor: Andrea Biondi

Area
  - Total: 163.98 km^{2} (63.31 sq mi)
- Elevation: 273 m (896 ft)

Population (31 August 2017)
  - Total: 8,596
  - Density: 52.42/km^{2} (135.8/sq mi)
- Demonym: Gavorranesi
- Time zone: UTC+1 (CET)
  - Summer (DST): UTC+2 (CEST)
- Postal code: 58023
- Dialing code: 0566
- Patron saint: St. Iulianus
- Saint day: August 28
- Website: Official website

Gavorrano is a mountain-side comune (municipality) in the Province of Grosseto in the western Italian region of Tuscany, located about 100 km (62 mi) southwest of Florence and about 25 km (16 mi) northwest of Grosseto. Gavorrano borders the municipalities of Castiglione della Pescaia, Grosseto, Massa Marittima, Roccastrada and Scarlino.

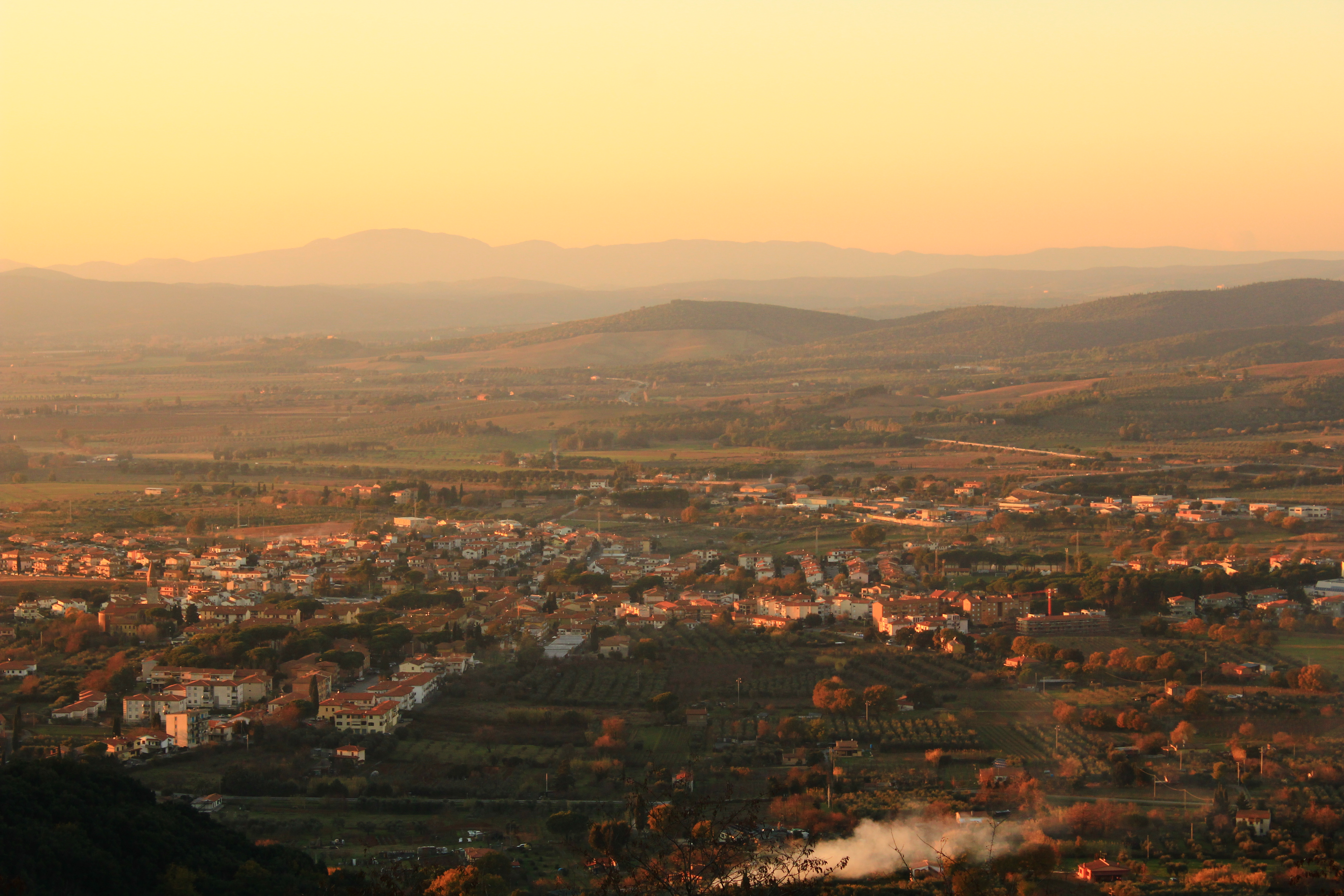
The town of Bagno di Gavorrano at sunset.

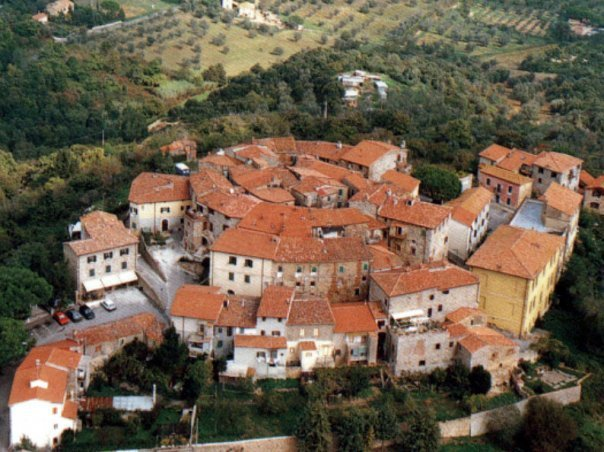
The old town of Ravi.

The village is located on the northern slope of Monte d'Alma (Poggio Ballone), east of Scarlino, in an area extremely rich in terms of mining, especially for large deposits of the iron ore pyrite which were intensively exploited until the early 1980s.

The town is known because of Pia de' Tolomei (whose fate is related in the "Purgatory" cantos of the Divine Comedy by Dante Alighieri), and for being the birthplace of the writer Giuseppe Bandi, Italian patriot and journalist.

== History ==
The Etruscan territory of Gavorrano fell under the direct control of Vetulonia which, through the paths along the river valleys of Sovata and Bruna, was rich in deposits of minerals to flow around the Lake Accesa. Excavations conducted by the University of Florence on the Santa Teresa estate between 2004 and 2007 discovered five gravestones used between the mid-7th century BC and the second half of the 6th century BC, surrounded by many farms. The results of these operations show a high percentage of households owning graves. In addition to agricultural resources, the population took advantage of the benefits of their strategic position which allowed control over the flow of minerals to the manufacturing center of Vetulonia.

The town of Gavorrano, built after the year 1000 as a possession of the bishops of Roselle, was later transferred to the Alberti family. In the 13th century it came under the control of the Pannocchieschi family, and then Volterra, Massa Marittima. With the fall of Massa Marittima, the town passed under the dominion of Siena. In the second half of the 16th century, the area was incorporated into the Grand Duchy of Tuscany after the final fall of the Republic of Siena. In more-recent history, the pyrite mine played an important role, changing the history of the village. In 1898 a loaf of pyrite came to light, thanks to the work of a citizen, Francesco Alberti. From this starting point, Europe's most important pyrite mine developed. This led to Gavorrano's primary importance for the whole area (as successor to the city of Massa Marittima, which had always been dominant in the area) after the war until the early 1970s (when it began to develop Follonica). After the war, the village of Scarlino became independent, breaking away from the territory of Gavorrano.

=== Nello dei Pannocchieschi and Pia de' Tolomei ===
A chapter in the history of the village of Gavorrano concerns the life of Pia de' Tolomei, a lady from Siena who met her death in the Castel di Pietra, a castle in the east of the town. She was married to Nello Pannocchieschi, who is known to have been lord of that castle, podestà of Volterra and Lucca, captain of the Guelphs, in 1284 and lived until at least 1322. He shut up his wife in his castle, and had her murdered in 1297 by having her thrown out of a window, after having locked her up for a while in his castle, perhaps because of her supposed infidelity, perhaps because he desired to get rid of her to marry someone else. The story was made famous by Dante in the fifth canto of his Purgatorio. The story is commemorated on the feast of Salto della Contessa ("The jump of the Countess"), which is held in Gavorrano every second Sunday of the month of August.

== Government ==
=== Frazioni ===
These are the frazioni (villages) of the comune of Gavorrano:

- Bagno di Gavorrano, a village situated in the plain below the old town.
- Caldana, a medieval hill-town.
- Castellaccia, a little mining village.
- Filare, a mining village located on the road between Gavorrano and Bagno.
- Giuncarico, a medieval hill-town.
- Grilli, a modern village situated in the plain.
- Potassa, a modern village developed near the train station.
- Ravi, a medieval hill-town.

=== List of mayors ===
Mayor	Term start	Term end	Party
Mauro Giusti	1990	1999	Democratic Party of the Left
Alessandro Fabbrizi	1999	2009	Democrats of the Left
Massimo Borghi	2009	2012	Independent (centre-left)
Elisabetta Iacomelli	2013	Incumbent	Independent (centre-left)

== Main sights ==
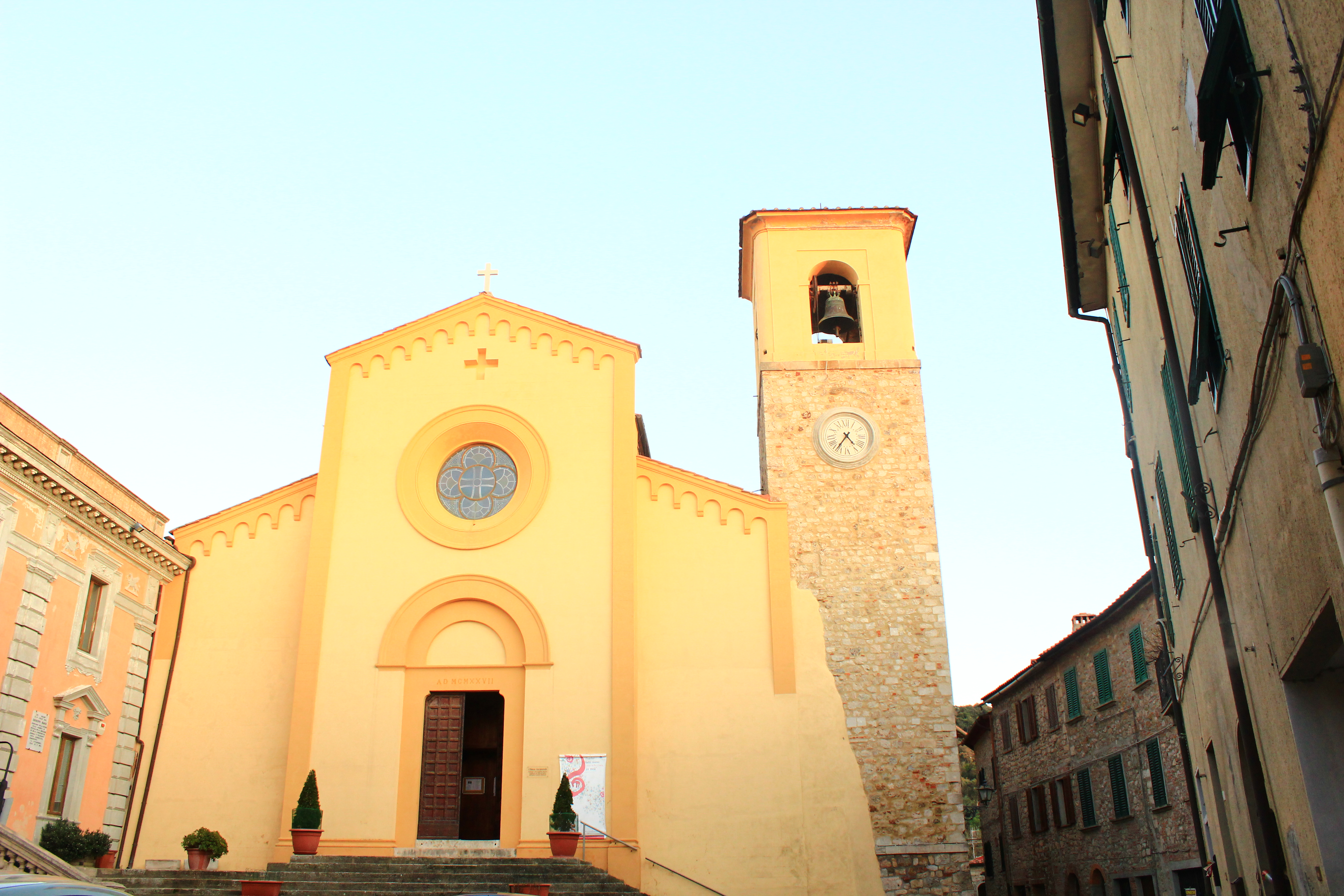
The Pieve di San Giuliano.

- Pieve di San Giuliano, main church of Gavorrano.
- Oratorio del Santissimo Sacramento.
- Palazzo Comunale, town hall of Gavorrano.
- Teatro delle Rocce ("Mine Theatre").
- Old walls of Gavorrano.
- Palazzo Bonaiuti, along the Via Aurelia.
- Church of San Giuseppe, in Bagno di Gavorrano.
- Church of San Biagio, in Caldana.
- Oratorio di Sant'Antonio da Padova, in Caldana.
- Palazzo Tosi, in Caldana.
- Old walls of Caldana.
- Church of Sant'Egidio, in Giuncarico.
- Oratorio del Santissimo Crocifisso, in Giuncarico.
- Government Palace, in Giuncarico.
- Palazzo Tedeschini Camaiori, in Giuncarico.
- Old walls of Giuncarico.
- Church of Santa Rita da Cascia, in Grilli.
- Lupo Farm, near Grilli.
- Church of San Leonardo, in Ravi.
- Old walls of Ravi.
- Remains of Castel di Pietra ("Stone Castle"), built by the Aldobrandeschi.
- Rocca di Frassinello, winery designed by Renzo Piano.
- Technological and Archaeological Park of Colline Metallifere Grossetane.

== Transports ==
- Gavorrano railway station
- Giuncarico railway station

== Sport ==
USD Follonica Gavorrano was founded in 1930, and it currently plays in Serie D. The football club hosts its games at the Stadio Romeo Malservisi.

== See also ==
- Maremma

== Sources ==
- Mazzolai, Aldo (1981). Storia ed arte della Maremma. Grosseto.
- Mazzolai, Aldo (1997). Guida della Maremma. Percorsi tra arte e natura. Florence: Le Lettere.
