= Caldana, Gavorrano =

Caldana
- Frazione
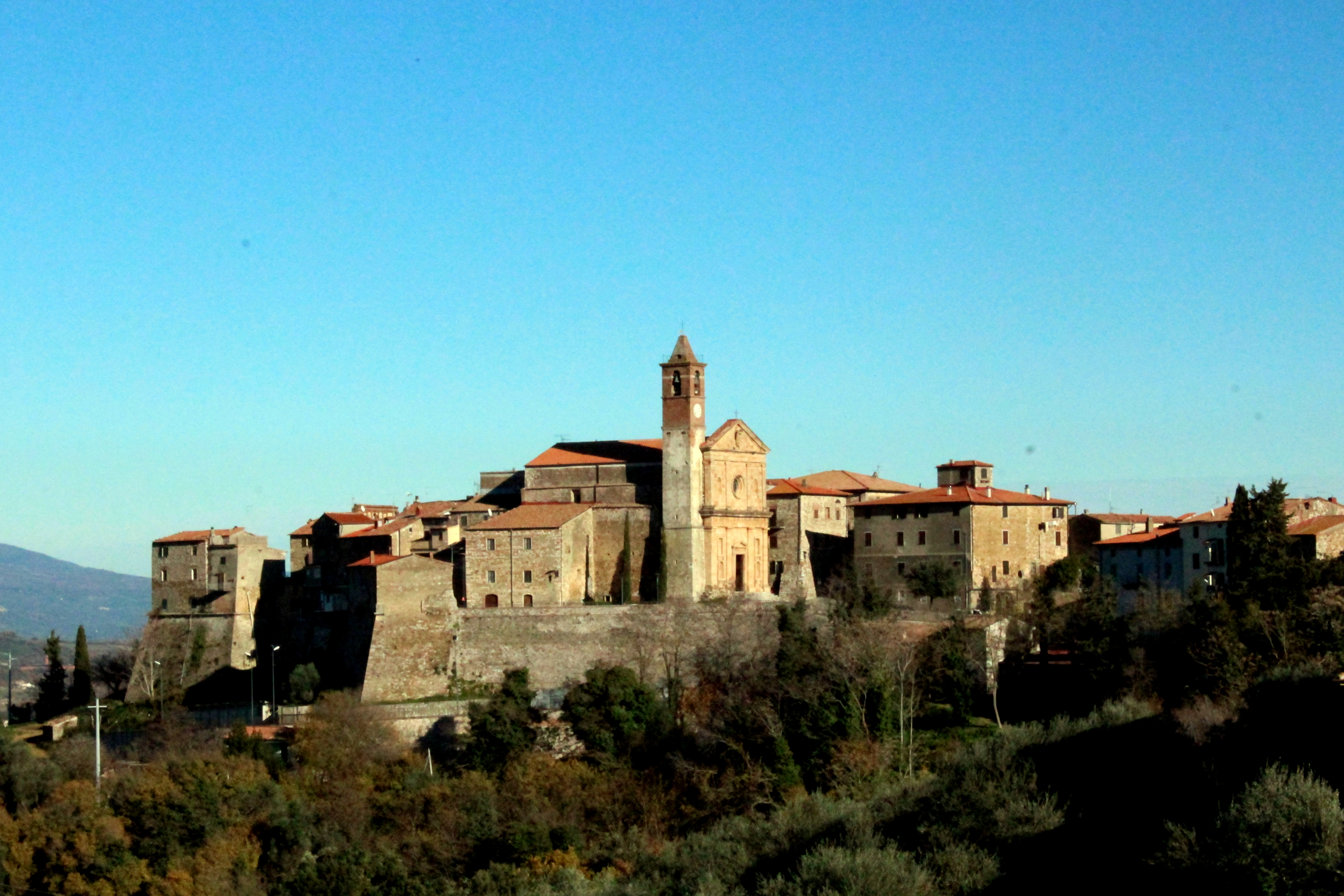
- View of Caldana

- Location of Caldana in Italy
- Coordinates: 42°53′43″N 10°55′39″E
- Country: Italy
- Region: Tuscany
- Province: Grosseto (GR)
- Comune: Gavorrano
- Elevation: 178 m (584 ft)

Population (2011)
  - Total: 906
- Demonym: Caldanesi
- Time zone: UTC+1 (CET)
  - Summer (DST): UTC+2 (CEST)
- Postal code: 58023

Caldana is a village in Tuscany, central Italy, administratively a frazione of the comune of Gavorrano, province of Grosseto. At the time of the 2001 census its population amounted to 980.

== Geography ==
Caldana is about 28 km from Grosseto and 8 km from Gavorrano, and it is situated on a hill in the south-eastern side of the massif of Monte Calvo.

== History ==
The village dates back to the Early Middle Ages, when it was a property of the bishops of Roselle. It was then ruled by the Pannocchieschi family and conquered by the Republic of Siena during the 14th century.

== Main sights ==
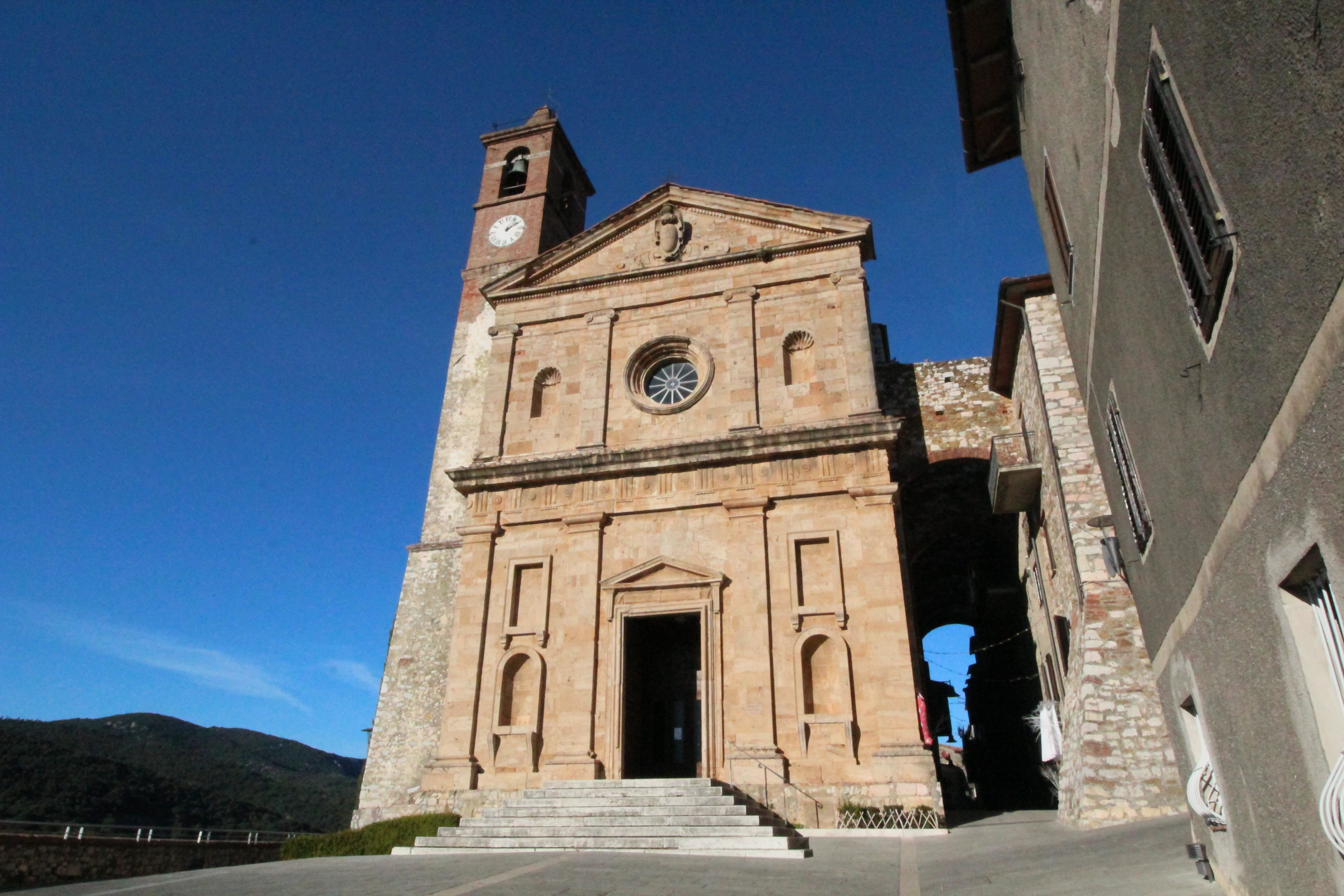
The church of San Biagio

- San Biagio (16th century), main parish church of the village, it is attributed to Renaissance architect Antonio da Sangallo the Elder. The bell tower was built in 1828. Inside the church there is a fresco by Giuseppe Nicola Nasini.
- Canonica of San Biagio, original building of the primitive 13th century church, it was renewed during the late 16th century.
- Oratory of Sant'Antonio da Padova (17th century), built in 1670, it was renewed with a new facade during the 19th century.
- Convent of Sant'Agostino, former building of the Order of Saint Augustine, it was suppressed in 1652. It is now used for residential purpose.
- Walls of Caldana, old fortifications which surround the village since 13th century.

== Media ==
The German TV series Ein Haus in der Toscana was set and filmed in Caldana.

== Bibliography ==
- Bruno Santi, Guida storico-artistica alla Maremma. Itinerari culturali nella provincia di Grosseto, Nuova Immagine, Siena, 1995, pp. 69–71.
- Giuseppe Guerrini, Torri e castelli della provincia di Grosseto, Nuova Immagine Editrice, Siena, 1999.

== See also ==
- Bagno di Gavorrano
- Castellaccia
- Filare
- Giuncarico
- Grilli, Gavorrano
- Potassa, Gavorrano
- Ravi, Gavorrano
