= Santa Maria in Portico a Fontegiusta, Siena =

Church in Siena, Italy

Coordinates: 43.325673°N 11.326311°E

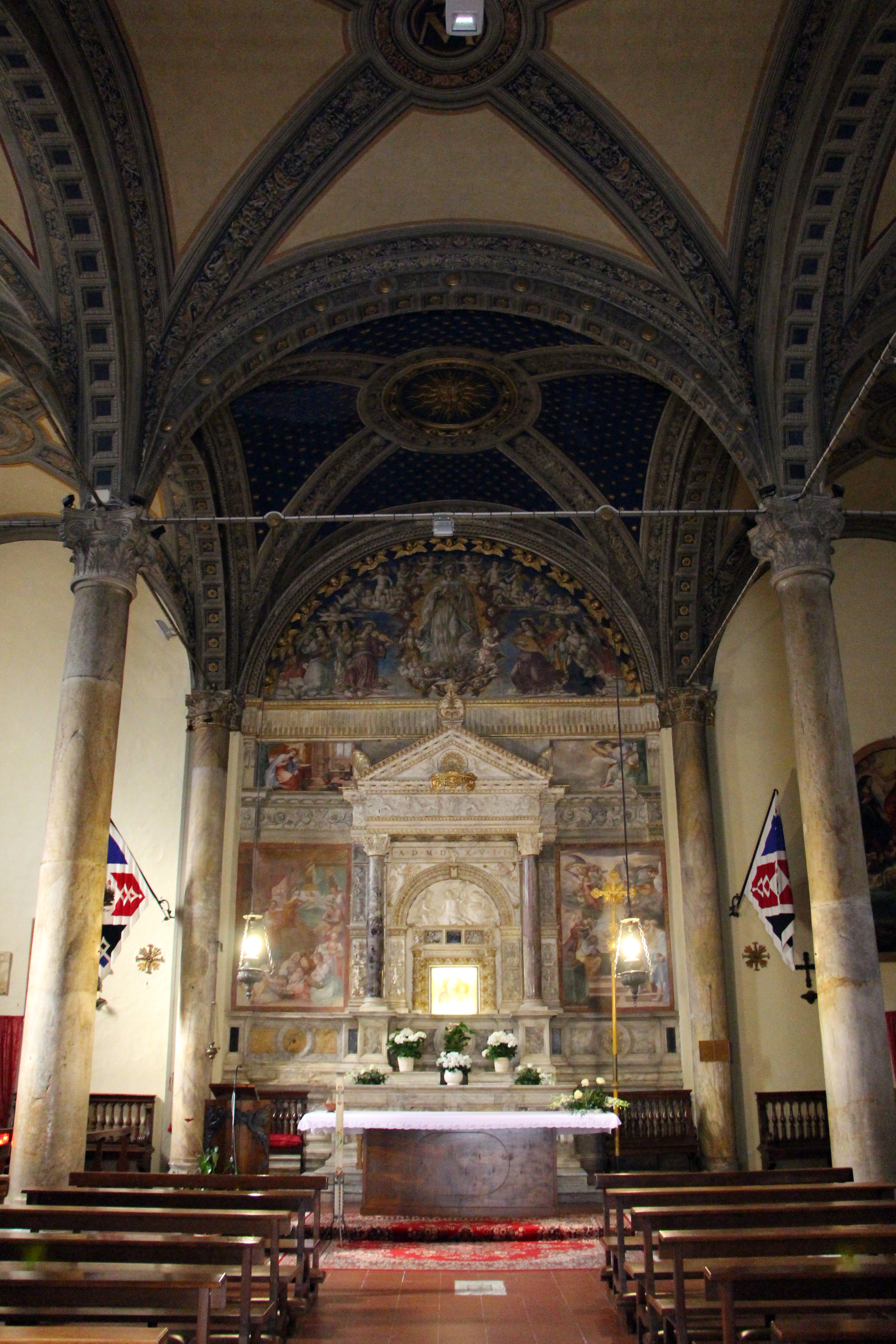
Santa Maria in Portico a Fontegiusta, altair of the church

Santa Maria in Portico a Fontegiusta is a Renaissance style, Roman Catholic church located on via di Fontegiusta, off Via Camollia near its intersection with Via Paparoni, in the terzo of Camollia, in Siena, region of Tuscany, Italy.

== History ==
The church was built to celebrate the victory of Siena over the Florentines in the Battle of Poggio Imperiale fought in Poggibonsi on September 7, 1479. Built a few years later, between 1482-1484, under the design of Francesco di Cristoforo Fedeli from Como. Most of the facade still remain in brick with a portal sculpted by Giovanni di Stefano.

In the interior, on the left wall, is a fresco of the Sibyl advising Augustus about the coming of Christ, attributed to Baldassarre Peruzzi, but now suspected to be a work of Daniele da Volterra.

The marble altar (1517) is attributed to Lorenzo di Mariano, called il Marrina. A large lunette was frescoed by Girolamo di Benvenuto, while the side frescoes depicting the Birth of the Virgin, Annunciation, and Glory of the Virgin (1600) were by Ventura Salimbeni.

To the right of the altar is a painting depicting the Blessed Ambrogio Sansedoni asking protection of the city of Siena by the Virgin (1590), by Francesco Vanni. On the right is an altarpiece by Bernardino Fungai (1508-1512).

The sacristy has a small museum dedicated to Christopher Columbus.

The former Porta de Pescaja, also known as Porta Fontegiusta, was a city gate, was present where the apse is now. It was walled up as Siena tried to limit access to the city during times of conflict.
