= Gavorrano railway station =

Railway station in Italy

Gavorrano
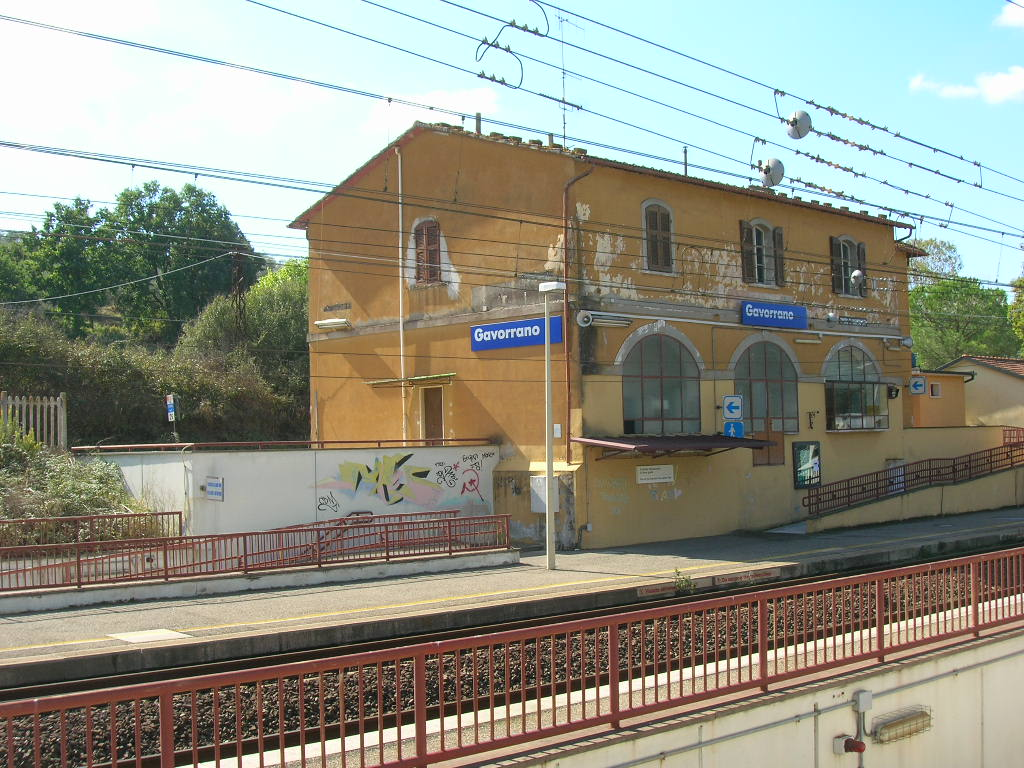

General information
- Location: Strada provinciale 152 Aurelia Vecchia; Potassa 58023; Gavorrano, Grosseto, Tuscany; Italy
- Coordinates: 42°56′52″N 10°56′01″E
- Operator: Rete Ferroviaria Italiana; Trenitalia
- Line: Tirrenica
- Tracks: 3

Other information
- Classification: Bronze

History
- Opened: 15 June 1864; 162 years ago
Location
- Location within Tuscany Location within Italy

Gavorrano railway station is an Italian railway station on the Tirrenica railway line, located in the village of Potassa, 7 km from the center of Gavorrano, Province of Grosseto, Tuscany.

== History ==
The station opened on 15 June 1864 along with the section of the Pisa–Rome railway from Follonica to Orbetello.

== Train services and movements ==
Regular passenger services to the station consist of regionale and regionale veloce services, which run frequently to Grosseto, Pisa Centrale, Roma Termini, and Florence SMN.

== See also ==
- History of rail transport in Italy
- List of railway stations in Tuscany
- Rail transport in Italy
- Railway stations in Italy
