= USD Follonica Gavorrano =

Italian football club

Follonica Gavorrano
- Full name: Unione Sportiva Dilettantistica Follonica Gavorrano
- Founded: 1926; 2019 (reformed)
- Ground: Stadio Romeo Malservisi, Gavorrano, Italy
- Capacity: 2,000
- Owner: Luigi Mansi
- Chairman: Paolo Balloni
- Manager: Marco Masi
- League: Serie D/E
- 2017–18: Serie C/A, 17th (relegated)
Home colours	Away colours

Unione Sportiva Follonica Gavorrano is an Italian association football club that represents the municipalities of Follonica and Gavorrano in Tuscany, the latter is also the company headquarters.

The club currently play in Serie D, the fourth tier of Italian football.

== History ==
The club was founded on 1930.

In the season 2009–10 it was promoted from Serie D to Lega Pro Seconda Divisione. The club was relegated back to Serie D after the 2013-14 season after only avoiding a relegation in the previous campaign in order to fill vacancies in the division. The club subsequently earned promotion to Serie C as Group E champions of the 2016–17 Serie D season. In June 2019 the merger between the company of Follonica and that of Gavorrano was made official: the new team, heir of the Gavorrano sporting tradition takes the name of Follonica Gavorrano and is admitted in Serie D.

== The Merger Project ==
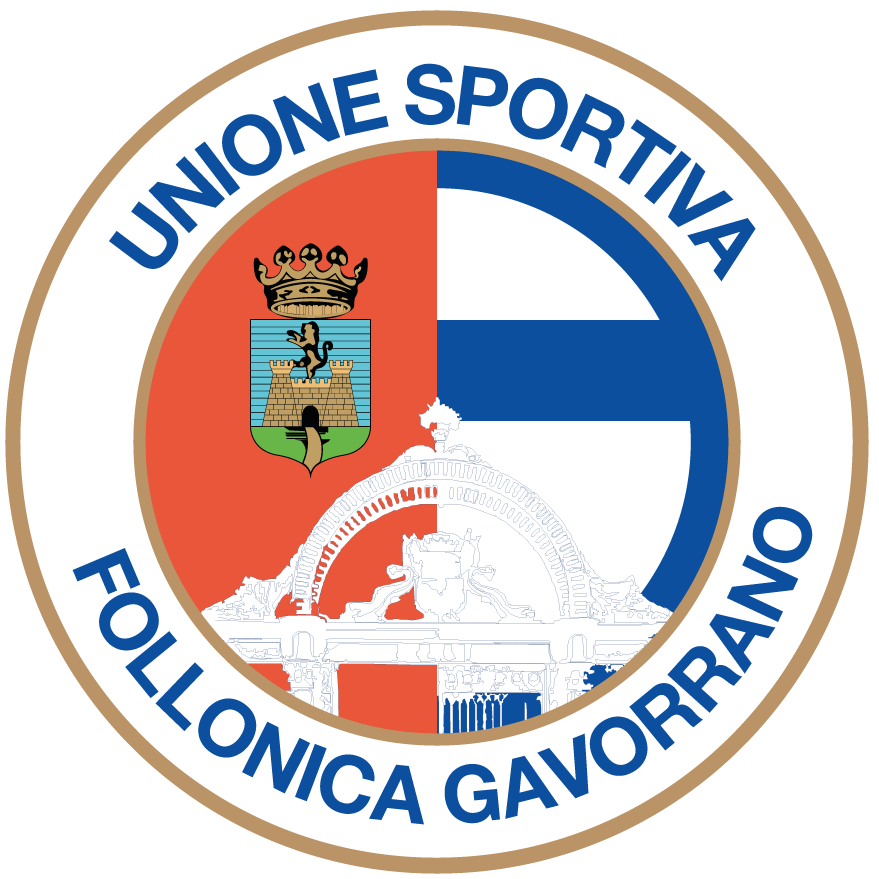

In 2019, Us Gavorrano and Real Follonica merged to form UsFG, focusing on youth development and a return to professional football, with plans for infrastructure expansion and broader community involvement.

UsFG was officially founded in the summer of 2019 through the merger of Unione Sportiva Gavorrano and Associazione Sportiva Real Follonica, following a collaboration at the youth sector level that began in the 2017-18 season. However, the idea for the merger took shape as early as February 2019, thanks to the vision of two key figures: engineer Luigi Mansi, owner of Us Gavorrano, and Andrea Benini, mayor of Follonica.

These two individuals laid the groundwork for the project that led to the creation of UsFG, a club representing both municipalities, home to nearly 30,000 people.

Regarding the first team, the goal is to return to professional football in the near future. In that case, the municipality of Follonica has committed to providing a suitable stadium for Serie C. Similarly, the mayor of Gavorrano, Andrea Biondi, has fully embraced the project, recognizing its broader significance.

For young footballers from northern Maremma, who previously had to travel far from home to play, Follonica Gavorrano has become a major hub, offering access to eight fields.

Beyond this, the Mansi family, a prominent and historically significant family in Tuscany has also answered the call from the municipality of Scarlino, reviving football there by reintroducing a team in the Third Category (Terza Categoria), with the long-term goal of integrating it into an even larger project. This expansion would allow the club to represent an area of around 35,000 residents.

Crucial to the success of UsFG have been President Paolo Balloni and General Director Filippo Vetrini, who played instrumental roles in facilitating the merger. Both have retained their key positions within the club, ensuring continuity from their previous roles at Us Gavorrano.

== Colors and badge ==
The colors of the club are white, blue and red.

== Famous presidents ==
=== Mario Matteini ===
Mario Matteini, the historic president who led the club from Seconda Categoria to Lega Pro Seconda Divisione from 1999 to 2011, died on 9 March 2011.

== Academy ==
The club operates an academy with teams at the U19, U17, U16, U15, and U14 levels, ensuring participation across multiple age groups.

== Honours ==
- Coppa Italia Serie D
  - Champions (1): 2021–22
