= Giuncarico =

- Frazione
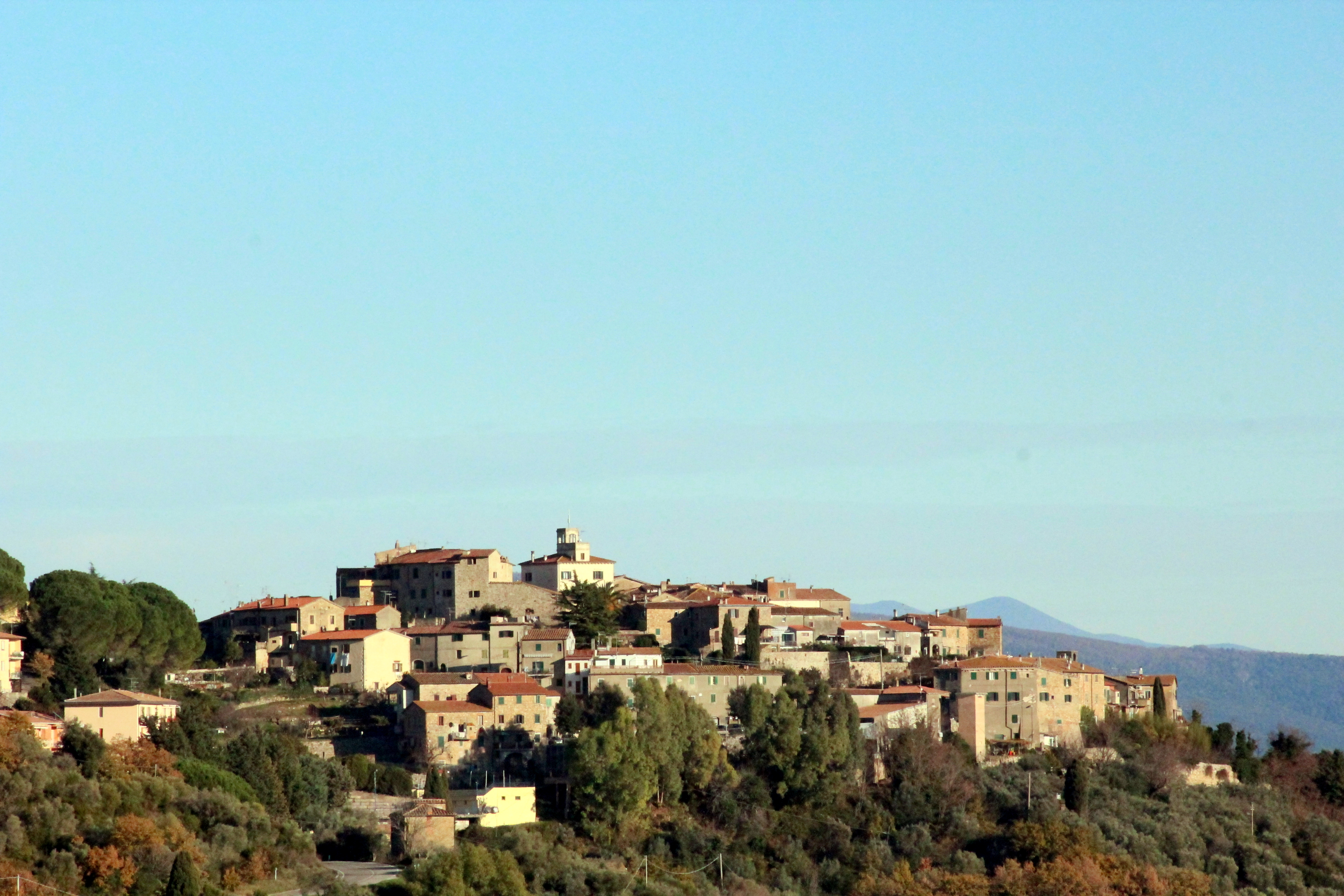
- View of Giuncarico

- Location of Giuncarico in Italy
- Coordinates: 42°54′25″N 10°59′31″E
- Country: Italy
- Region: Tuscany
- Province: Grosseto (GR)
- Comune: Gavorrano
- Elevation: 170 m (560 ft)

Population (2011)
  - Total: 449
- Demonym: Giuncarichesi
- Time zone: UTC+1 (CET)
  - Summer (DST): UTC+2 (CEST)
- Postal code: 58023

Giuncarico is a village in Tuscany, central Italy, administratively a frazione of the comune of Gavorrano, province of Grosseto. At the time of the 2001 census its population amounted to 399.

== History ==
The village dates back to the Early Middle Ages, when it was a property of the Aldobrandeschi family and then of the Pannocchieschi. It was then conquered by the Republic of Siena during the 14th century.

== Main sights ==
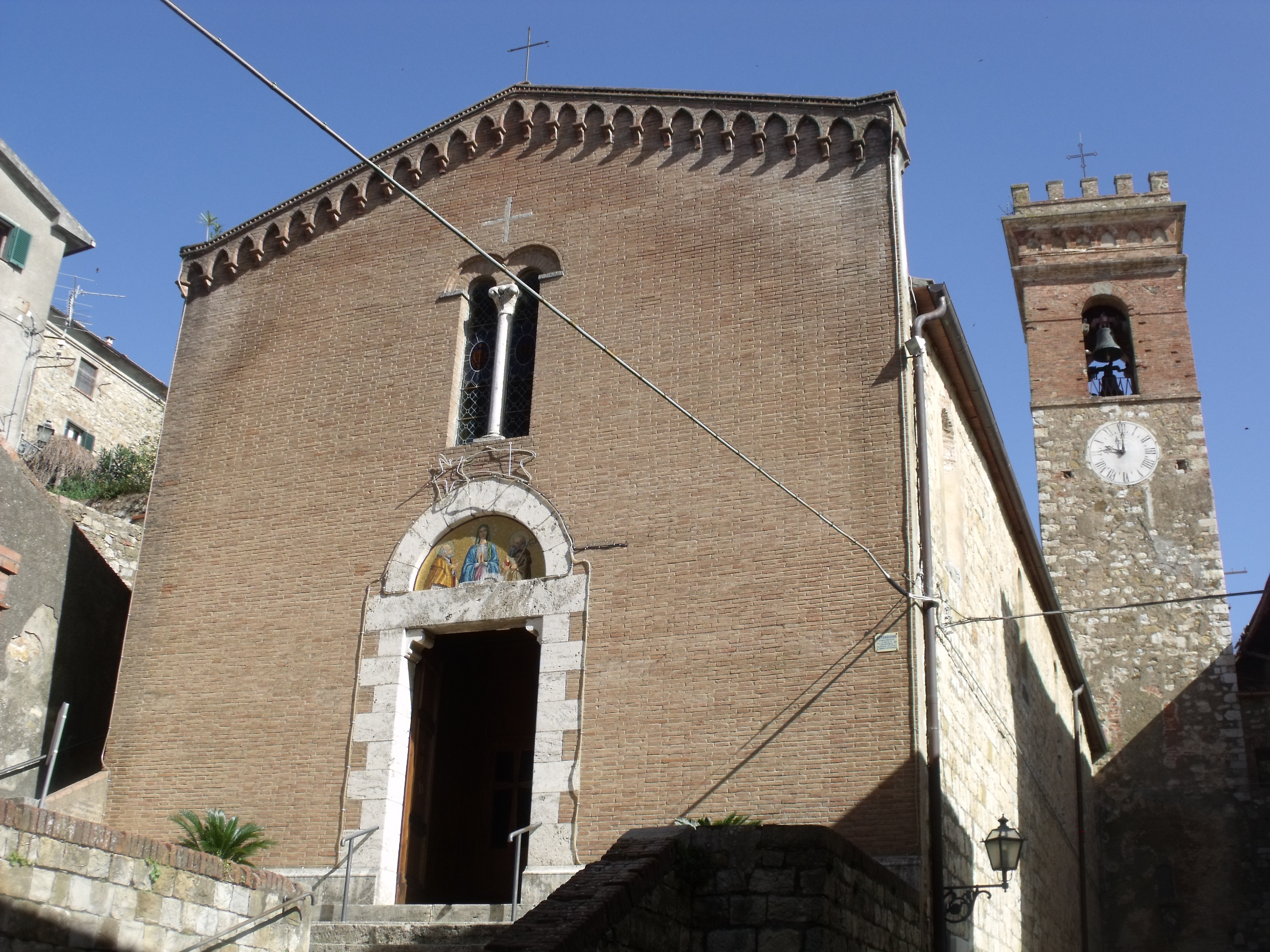
The church of Sant'Egidio

=== Churches ===
- Sant'Egidio (13th century), main parish church of the village, it was restructured in 1930 and then renewed in 1960.
- Oratory of Santissimo Crocifisso (19th century), situated outside the city walls, it was built in 1892.
- Hermitage of Sant'Ansano (17th century), it's now in ruins.

=== Palazzi ===
- Palazzo Pretorio (16th century)
- Palazzo Camaiori-Piccolomini (15th century)
- Palazzo Tedeschini-Camaiori (17th century)
- Palazzo Bonaiuti (19th century), in the nearby countryside

=== Fortifications ===
The walls of Giuncarico has enclosed the village since 11th century. The Porta del Castello is the main gate of the old citadel.

== Transport ==
Giuncarico is about 25 km from Grosseto and 15 km from Gavorrano, and it is situated along the Via Aurelia highway. It is also served by the Tirrenica railway line thanks to its own station.

== Bibliography ==
- Bruno Santi, Guida storico-artistica alla Maremma. Itinerari culturali nella provincia di Grosseto, Nuova Immagine, Siena, 1995, pp. 72–73.
- Giuseppe Guerrini, Torri e castelli della provincia di Grosseto, Nuova Immagine Editrice, Siena, 1999.

== See also ==
- Bagno di Gavorrano
- Caldana
- Castellaccia
- Filare
- Grilli, Gavorrano
- Potassa, Gavorrano
- Ravi, Gavorrano
