= Ravi, Gavorrano =

Ravi
- Frazione
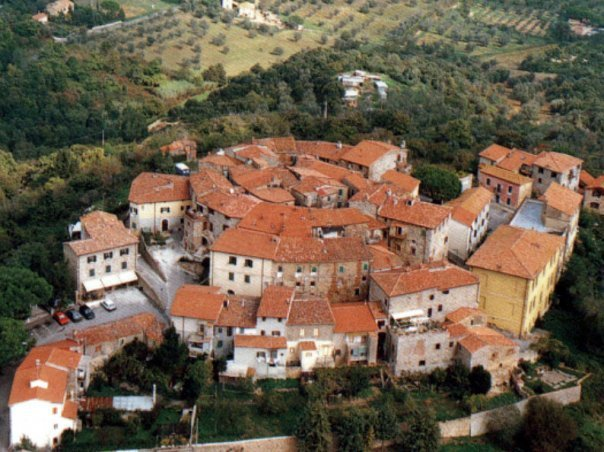
- View of Ravi

- Location of Ravi in Italy
- Coordinates: 42°54′41″N 10°55′7″E
- Country: Italy
- Region: Tuscany
- Province: Grosseto (GR)
- Comune: Gavorrano
- Elevation: 209 m (686 ft)

Population (2011)
  - Total: 245
- Demonym: Ravigiani
- Time zone: UTC+1 (CET)
  - Summer (DST): UTC+2 (CEST)

Ravi is a village in Tuscany, central Italy, administratively a frazione of the comune of Gavorrano, province of Grosseto. At the time of the 2001 census its population amounted to 263.

Ravi is about 32 km from Grosseto and 2 km from Gavorrano, and it is situated on one of the peaks of Monte Calvo, along the road which links Gavorrano to Caldana.

== History ==
The village was born as a property of the bishops of Roselle in the 8th century. It was formerly known as Ravi di Maremma.

== Main sights ==
- Church of San Leonardo (15th century), main parish church of the village, it was restructured in 1810.
- Church of Santa Caterina da Siena (16th century), it was built in 1571 and then transformed into warehouses and garage in 1930.
- Chapel of Nuovo Inguardio, modern chapel in the hamlet of Bivio di Ravi.
- Castle of Ravi, mentioned for the first time in a document of 784, it has been incorporated in the architectures of the old centre.

== Bibliography ==
- (in Italian) Emanuele Repetti, «Ravi », Dizionario Geografico Fisico Storico della Toscana, 1833–1846.
- Bruno Santi, Guida storico-artistica alla Maremma. Itinerari culturali nella provincia di Grosseto, Siena, Nuova Immagine, 1995.
- Giuseppe Guerrini, Torri e castelli della provincia di Grosseto, Siena, Nuova Immagine, 1999.
