= Neoclassical architecture in Tuscany =

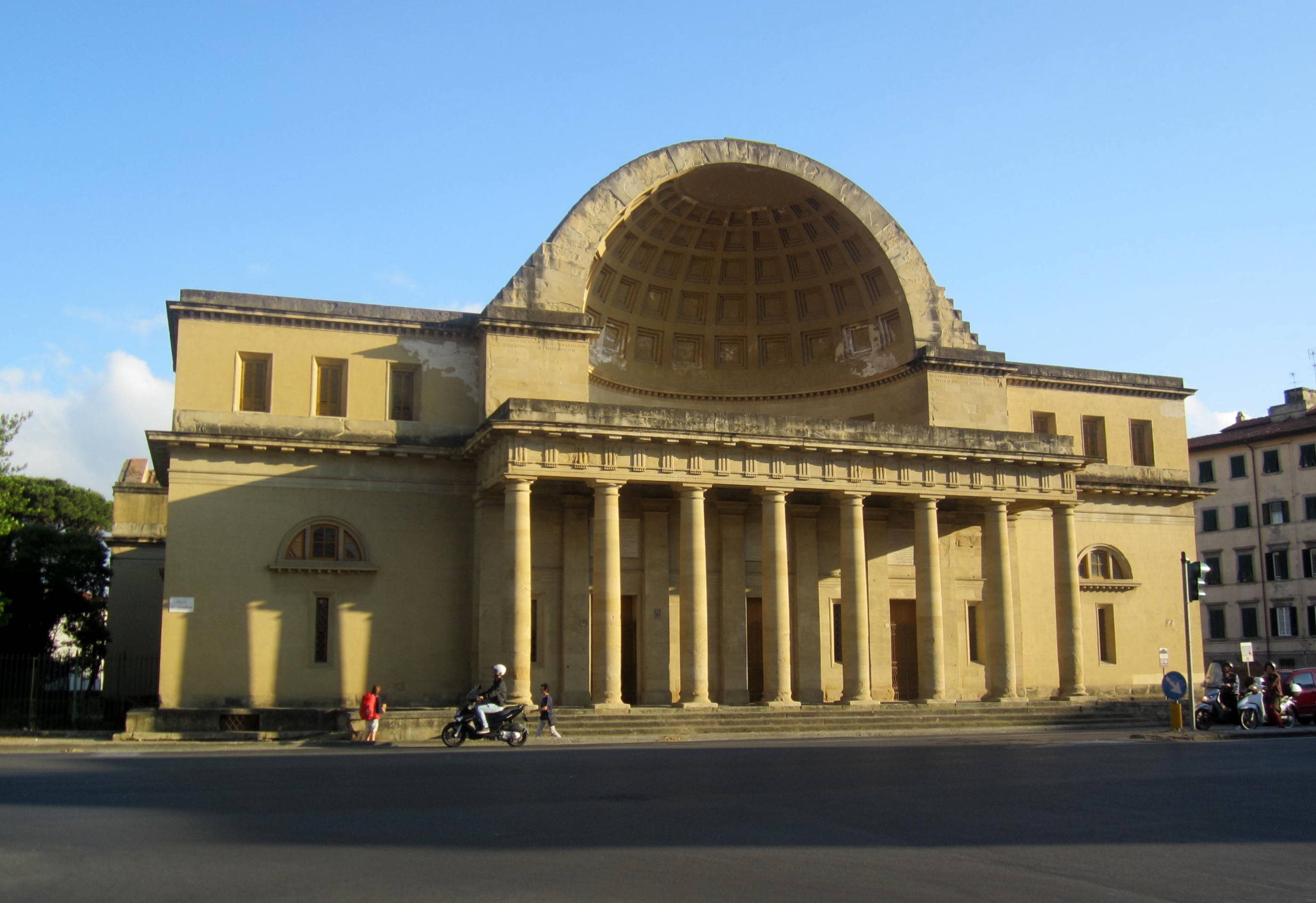
Pasquale Poccianti, Cisternone, Livorno

Neoclassical architecture in Tuscany established itself between the second half of the eighteenth century and the first half of the nineteenth century within a historical-political framework substantially aligned with the one that affected the rest of the Italian peninsula, while nonetheless developing original features.

Unlike other regions, where architects often arrived from outside during the years of renewal, the Academy of Fine Arts in Florence directly trained the protagonists of a particularly lively period, especially within the Grand Duchy of Tuscany.

== Historical context ==
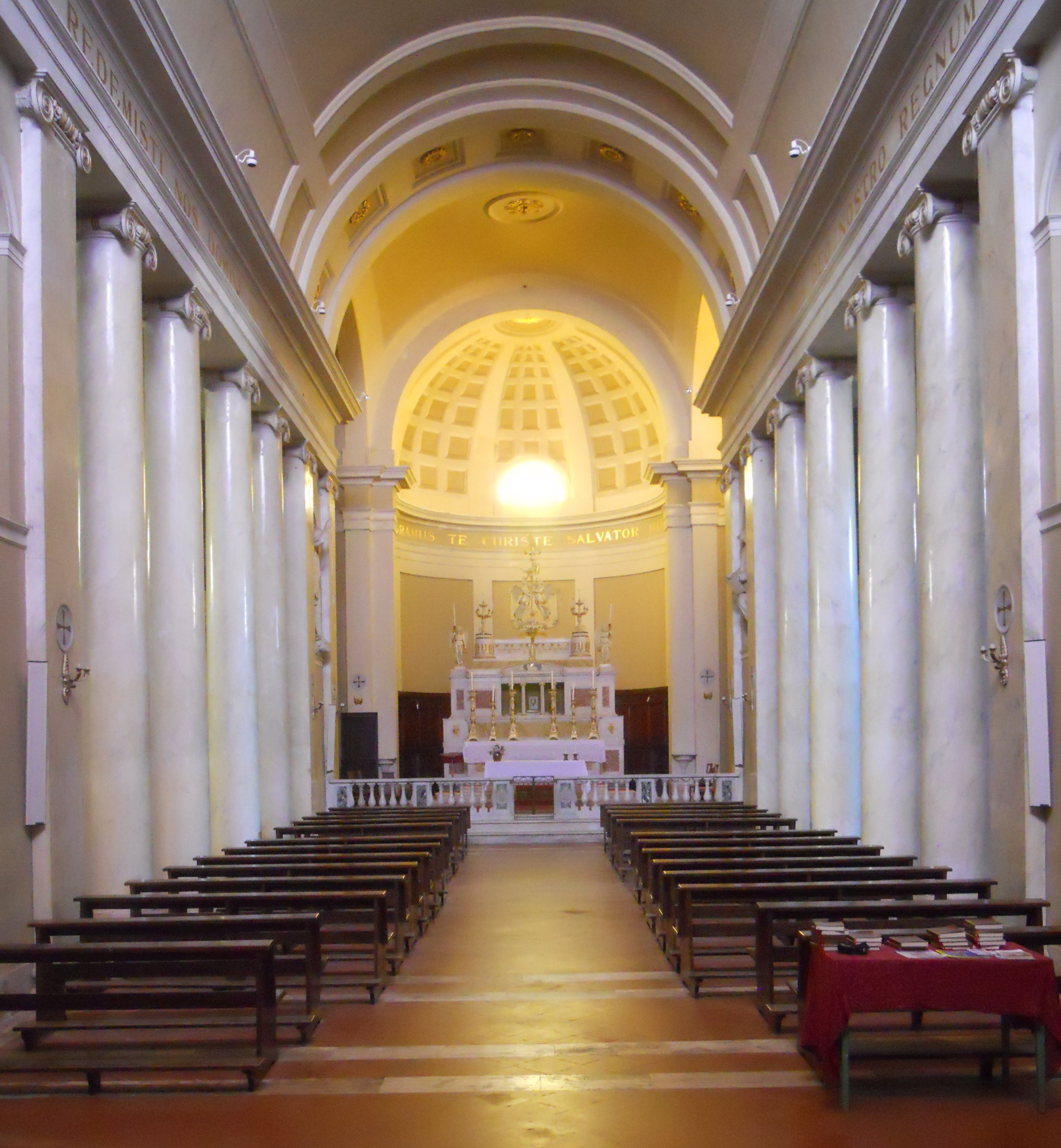
Agostino Fantastici, Montalcino Cathedral, interior

In the first half of the 18th century Tuscany was largely administered by the grand duchy controlled by the Habsburg-Lorraine, and had Florence as its capital. Then there were a number of smaller entities: the Republic of Lucca, which included the city of the same name and neighboring territories; the Principality of Piombino, which extended over the Val di Cornia and part of the Island of Elba; the State of the Presidi, which essentially included the area of Orbetello and was politically dependent on the Kingdom of Naples; and finally, the Duchy of Massa and Carrara, which governed a small territory facing the sea in the northern part of the region.

With the French occupation, the Grand Duchy was succeeded by the Kingdom of Etruria (1801-1807), which also included the State of the Presidi; Piombino and Lucca were united into a single principality, to which the Duchy of Massa and Carrara was also assigned in 1806. In December 1807, the Kingdom of Etruria was suppressed and the grand duchy, still controlled by the French empire, was divided into three territorial departments called "of the Mediterranean," "of the Ombrone," and "of the Arno," with capitals Livorno, Siena and Florence, respectively.

At the Congress of Vienna, with the Conservative Order, the Grand Duchy obtained some territorial retouches, with the annexation of the Principality of Piombino, the Presidi State and some minor fiefdoms; in 1847 the Duchy of Lucca was also included. In 1860 the Grand Duchy of Tuscany was annexed into the Kingdom of Sardinia, later becoming part of the Kingdom of Italy.

== General features ==
The events that affected Tuscany can be essentially distinguished into a pre-revolutionary or at least 18th-century phase, a revolutionary phase coinciding with the French occupation, and a third phase, that of the Conservative Order, which preceded the annexation to the Kingdom of Italy.

Architecturally, the first phase was essentially a reaction to the Rococo; the cultural climate established by the Habsburg Lorraine favored the transposition of the Enlightenment into architecture, affirming principles more closely aligned with functionalism, with a new aesthetic ideal based on the use of simple geometric forms and the rejection of excessive ostentation.

In the second phase the formal apparatus was affected by Napoleonic influence, with greater derivation from classical Greek and Roman art.

During the third period, artistic manifestations were filtered through local tradition, especially that of the Renaissance, thus moving away from the historical foundations that had seen them arise; Neoclassicism, from being a symbol of emancipation of thought and cultural freedom, asserted itself instead as a stylistic code adaptable to the return of the Ancien Régime, in what critics have called "Romantic Neoclassicism."

With the annexation of the Tuscan territories to the Kingdom of Italy in the second half of the nineteenth century, Neoclassicism opened up to a variety of pursuits that led to the disintegration of the concept of style, thus paving the way for eclecticism.

== The Regency Period (1739-1765) ==
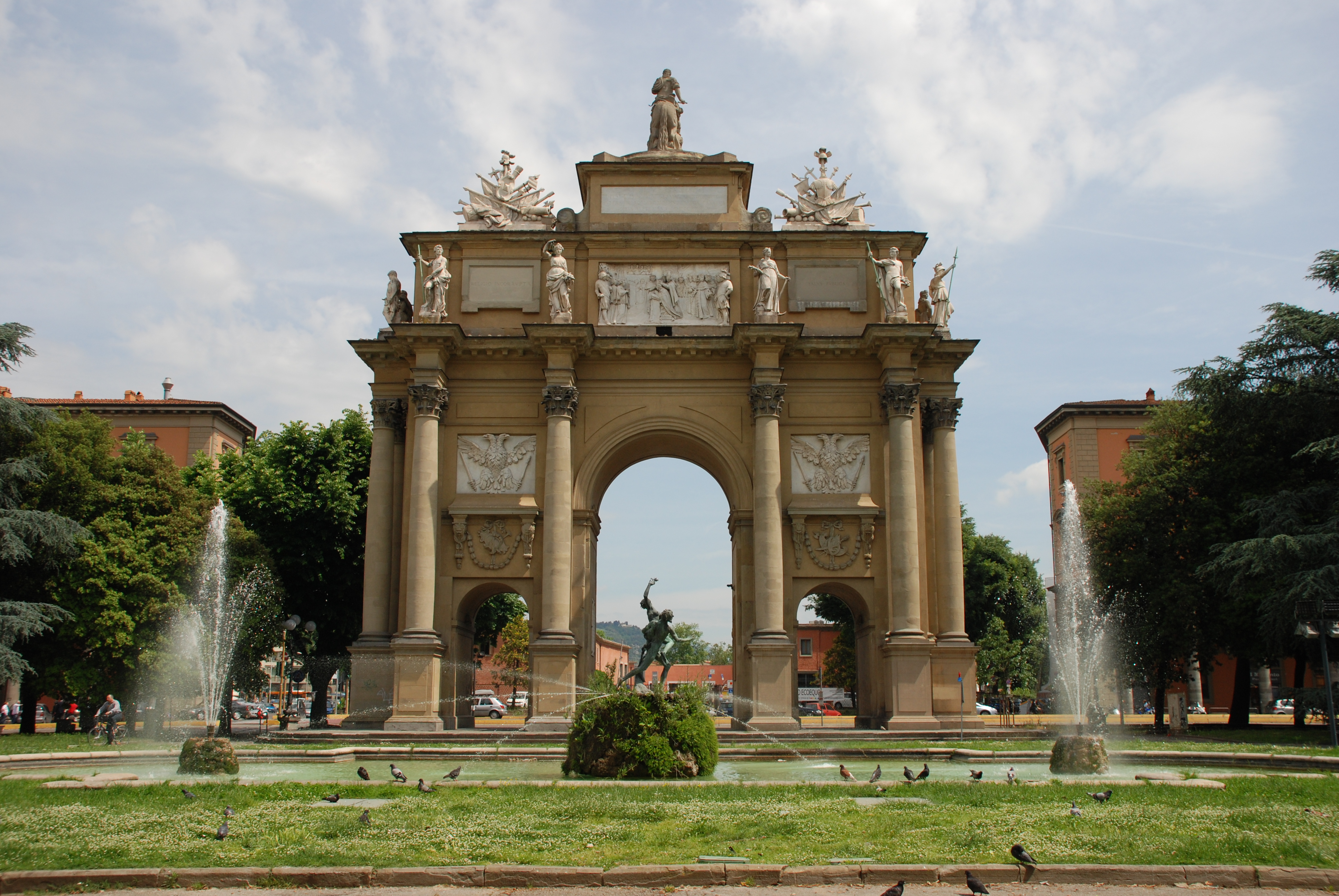
Jean-Nicolas Jadot, Triumphal Arch, Florence

In January 1739, Grand Duke Francis III made his entry into Florence through the triumphal arch erected by Jean-Nicolas Jadot outside the San Gallo Gate, formally taking possession of the Grand Duchy of Tuscany after the death of Gian Gastone de' Medici and the subsequent regency of Marc de Beauvau, Prince of Craon. Contrary to the tradition of the time, the arch was not an ephemeral work made of wood, canvas and plaster, but rather constituted a structure in permanent plan, taking up a theme from Roman art of particular symbolic significance, inaugurating the spread of this typology in the neoclassical era. The arch designed by Jadot, placed before the ancient medieval walls of Florence, thus foreshadowed the renewal that would soon affect the architecture of the Grand Duchy of Tuscany.

The regency age constituted the preparation and platform for the subsequent reforming action that Grand Duke Peter Leopold would promote after the death of his father Francis in 1765. Although with various limitations and not without difficulties, the first period of the Lorraine grand duchy was characterized by the implementation of a comprehensive plan aimed at the knowledge of the territory and the better exploitation of natural resources: this includes, for example, the motu proprio for the protection of the botanical society (1739), the founding of the Accademia dei Georgofili (1753), the commissioning of Odoardo Warren to draw the plans of the cities of the grand duchy, the drafting of a general topographical map of Tuscany commissioned from Leonardo Ximenes, the drafting of a report on the natural history of the countries of the grand duchy published by Giovanni Targioni Tozzetti between 1751 and 1754, the renovation of the baths of San Giuliano, and the work on the imperial canal of Lake Bientina. The Regency also favored the development of cultural services, both in the capital and in the smaller centers of the grand duchy, with the opening and renovation of a series of libraries and theatrical spaces, from Pontremoli to Siena, from Prato to Pisa, passing through the reconstruction in masonry of the hall of the Pergola Theater in Florence.

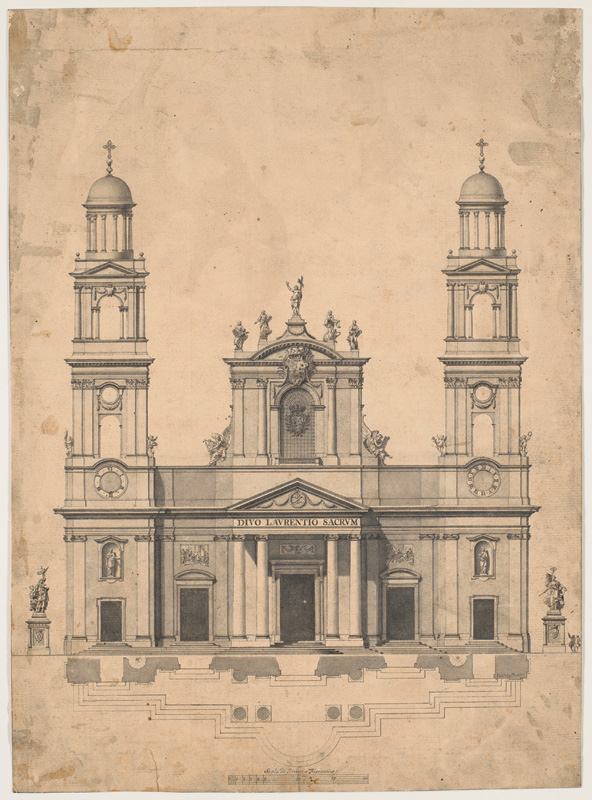
Carl Marcus Tuscher, project for the facade of the basilica of San Lorenzo, in Florence

In general, this period was characterized by an architecture devoid of ostentation. The layout of the new baths of San Giuliano, the design of which was drawn up between 1744 and 1762 by architects Giuseppe Ruggieri, Ignazio Pellegrini and Gaspare Paoletti, constitutes a significant example of this architecture: among the simple buildings of the baths, imagined as the fulcrum of development of a new inhabited settlement, the central building, which stood out exclusively, distinguished by the window-balcony motif and the clock above it. Also recalled is the design for the new Livorno suburb of San Jacopo: a regular-mesh plan layout, somewhat akin to the design of the contemporary Borgo Teresiano in Trieste, with dwellings characterized by sober facades and the search for maximum simplicity of distribution in the plan. The same essentiality is found in the design for a market square to be built near the church of San Pierino, Pisa (1749), in the facade of the church of San Giuseppe (1759) and in the Marucelliana library in Florence.

In other words, the Lorraine period had inaugurated a more measured design attitude than the one held during Gian Gastone's grand duchy, with a few apparent exceptions, such as the church of Santa Felicita (completed in 1739), the bell tower of San Lorenzo with its flattened bulbous finial (1740) and the continuation of the sumptuous Princes' Chapel; works that constitute the last reflection of the Medici period, as they had been begun prior to the Regency or commissioned directly by Princess Anna Maria Luisa de' Medici.

In this context, Ignazio Pellegrini's monumental designs for the royal chapel and theater in the Pitti Palace, or for the new entrance to the Uffizi Gallery, were deemed unrealistic and did not find implementation; other architects, such as the brothers Giuseppe and Ferdinando Ruggieri, were willing to moderate their ambitions and found greater fortune in commissioning, although they never adhered to a neoclassical language; for example, the facade of San Filippo Neri and the ribs on the interior walls of Santa Felicita, designed by Ferdinando, appear far removed from the authentically neoclassical invention constituted by Carl Marcus Tuscher's proposal for the facade of San Lorenzo (1739).

== From Peter Leopold to Ferdinand III (1765-1799) ==
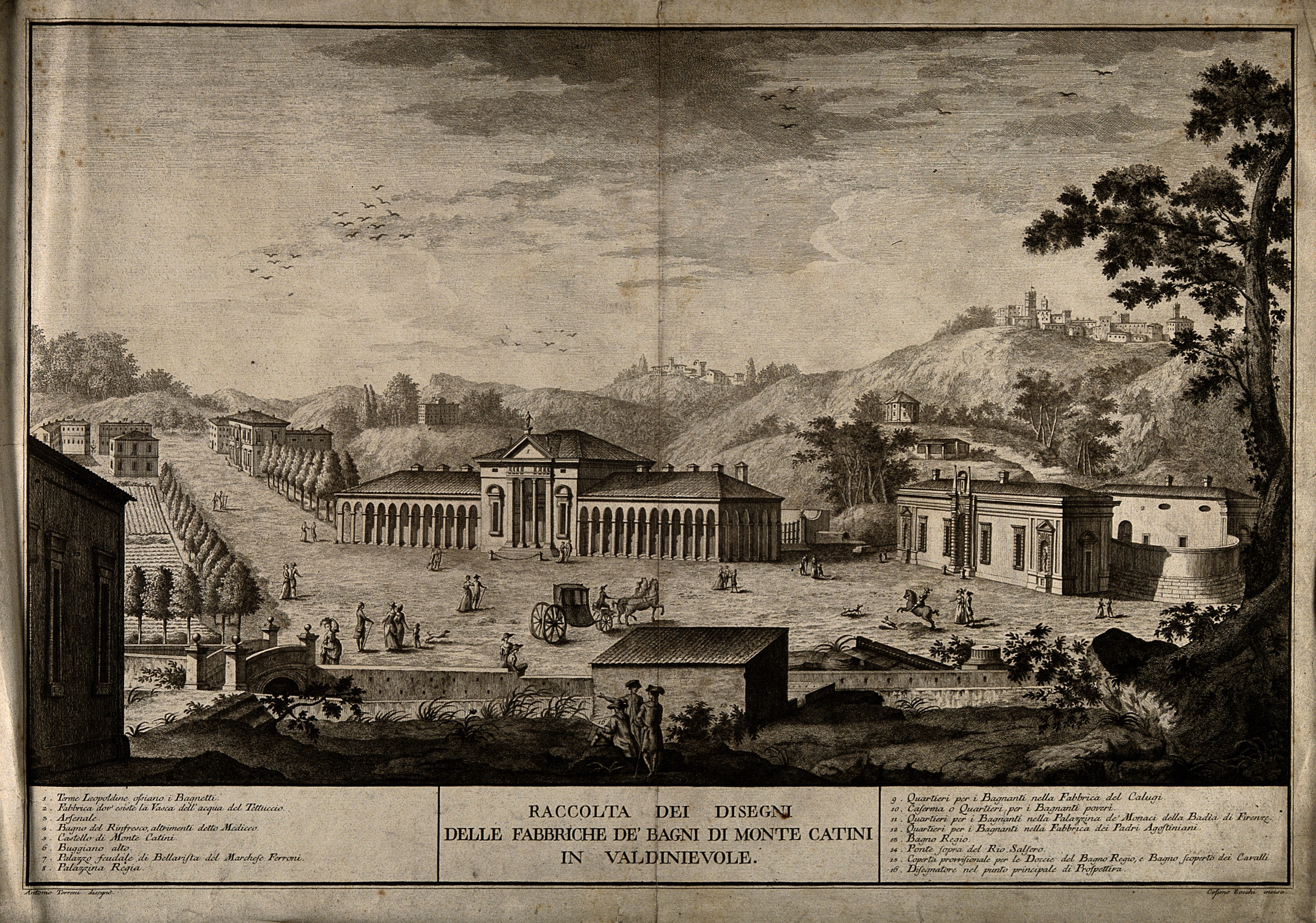
Gaspare Paoletti, the Terme Leopoldine (center) and the Tettuccio spa (right), in Montecatini Terme

In 1765 Peter Leopold became Grand Duke of Tuscany, ending the Regency Age. An enlightened ruler, he was not a true patron of the arts and consistently demonstrated an attitude of prudence toward the costs of architectural undertakings. Careful administration and the obvious goal of containing state expenditures, however, did not limit the realization of works of public utility, which perfectly embodied the period of ideological change desired by Peter Leopold, such as the reorganization of the grand duchy's hospitals, the new lazaret at Livorno, the refounding of the thermal baths of Montecatini, the building of the new cemeteries in Livorno and Florence, the reclamation of the Maremma, Val di Chiana, and Val di Nievole, the rewards distributed for the foundation of farmhouses in the Pisa and Siena provinces, and even the construction of new roads and the renovation of existing ones.

In 1784 he founded the Florence Academy of Fine Arts, entrusting its direction to Gaspare Paoletti, who, albeit as a continuer of the Renaissance tradition, can be considered the initiator of neoclassical style in Tuscany. Paoletti, who boasted an excellent preparation on both architectural and technical levels, transmitted this dual aptitude to his pupils, precisely in the years when the split between the Académie des beaux-arts and the École polytechnique was taking place in Paris.

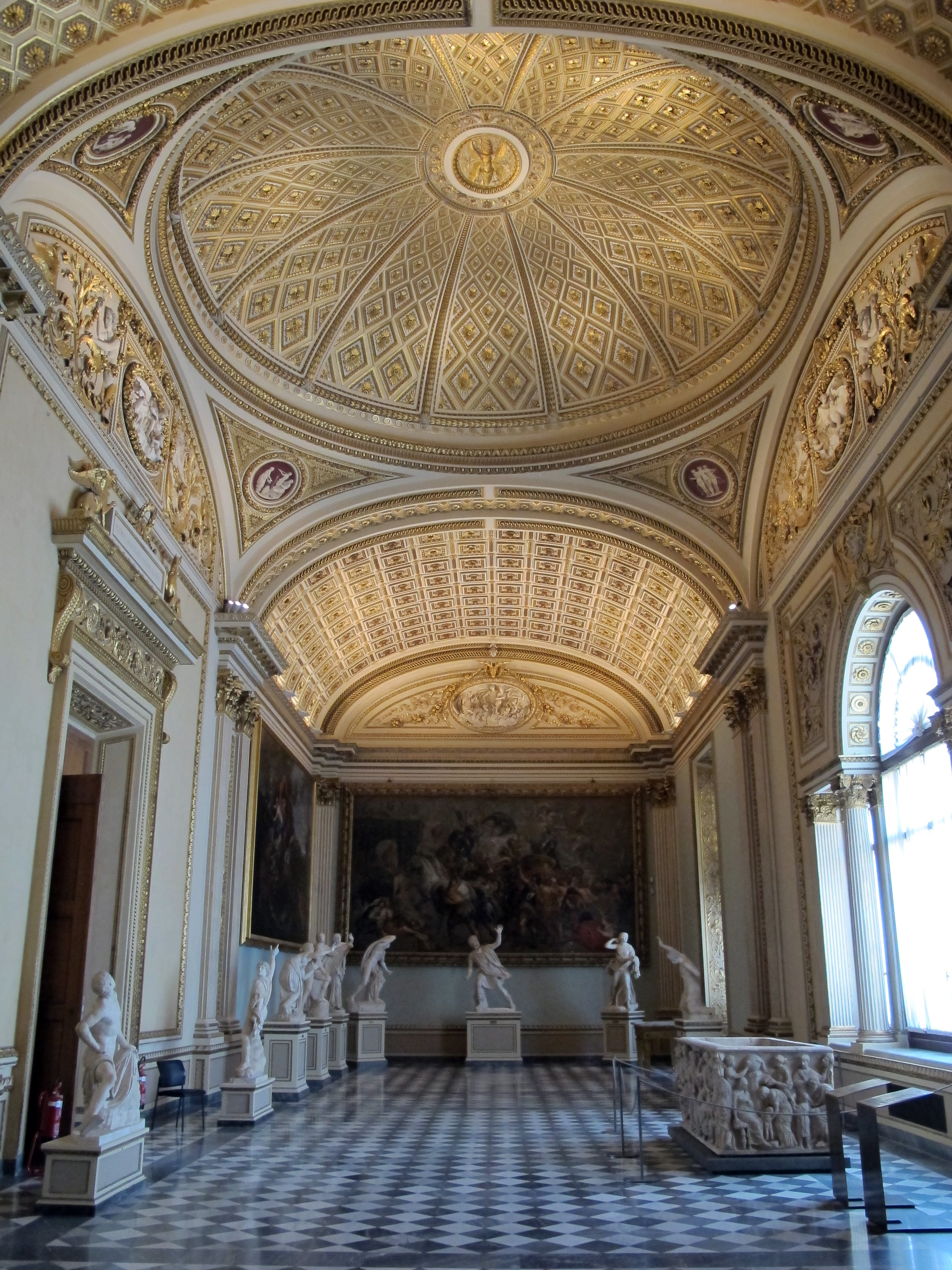
Zanobi del Rosso, hall of the Niobe, Uffizi Gallery, Florence

An expert in hydraulics, he is mainly credited with the refounding of the baths of Montecatini, with the construction of the Bagno Regio, the Terme Leopoldine and the Tettuccio. Also noteworthy is the design, which remained on paper, for a circular bathhouse with an uncovered inner basin bordered by an annular colonnade, which, if realized, would have represented the most interesting stylistic achievement of Tuscan architecture of the period.

Between 1766 and 1783 Paoletti worked on the villa of Poggio Imperiale, in Florence, enlarging the previous Medici building with the formation of two side courtyards characterized by a measured neoclassical language; he built the rear facade, the ballroom on the main floor and constructed the stables.

In the same years he was engaged in the construction site of the Pitti Palace. While for the construction of the new forepart of the façade, on the Via Guicciardini side, he limited himself to reproposing the loggia that Giuseppe Ruggieri had employed in the rondeaux placed towards the Via Romana, inside the palace he built, with the contribution of the brothers Grato and Giocondo Albertolli, the refined "Hall of the Stuccoes" (1776-1783), which, because of its use of the Corinthian theme and the stucco decoration, can be related to other neoclassical designs of the time, such as the aforementioned ballroom in the villa at Poggio Imperiale and the room created by Zanobi del Rosso to house the sculptural group of Niobe inside the Uffizi Gallery. Beginning in 1781, again for the Pitti Palace complex, he began construction of the Palazzina della Meridiana, which was later taken over by his pupil Pasquale Poccianti.

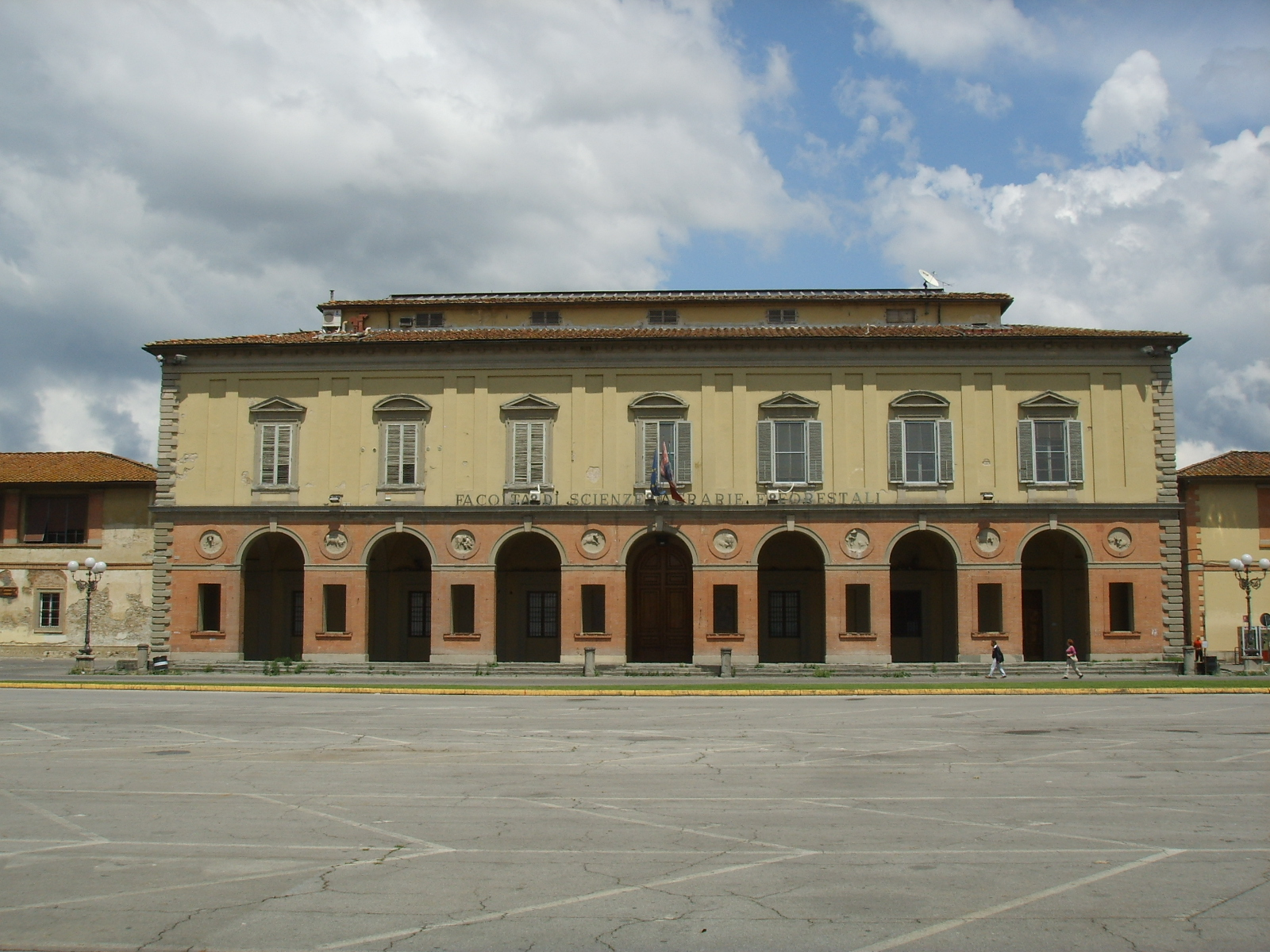
Giuseppe Manetti, Palazzina Reale delle Cascine, Florence

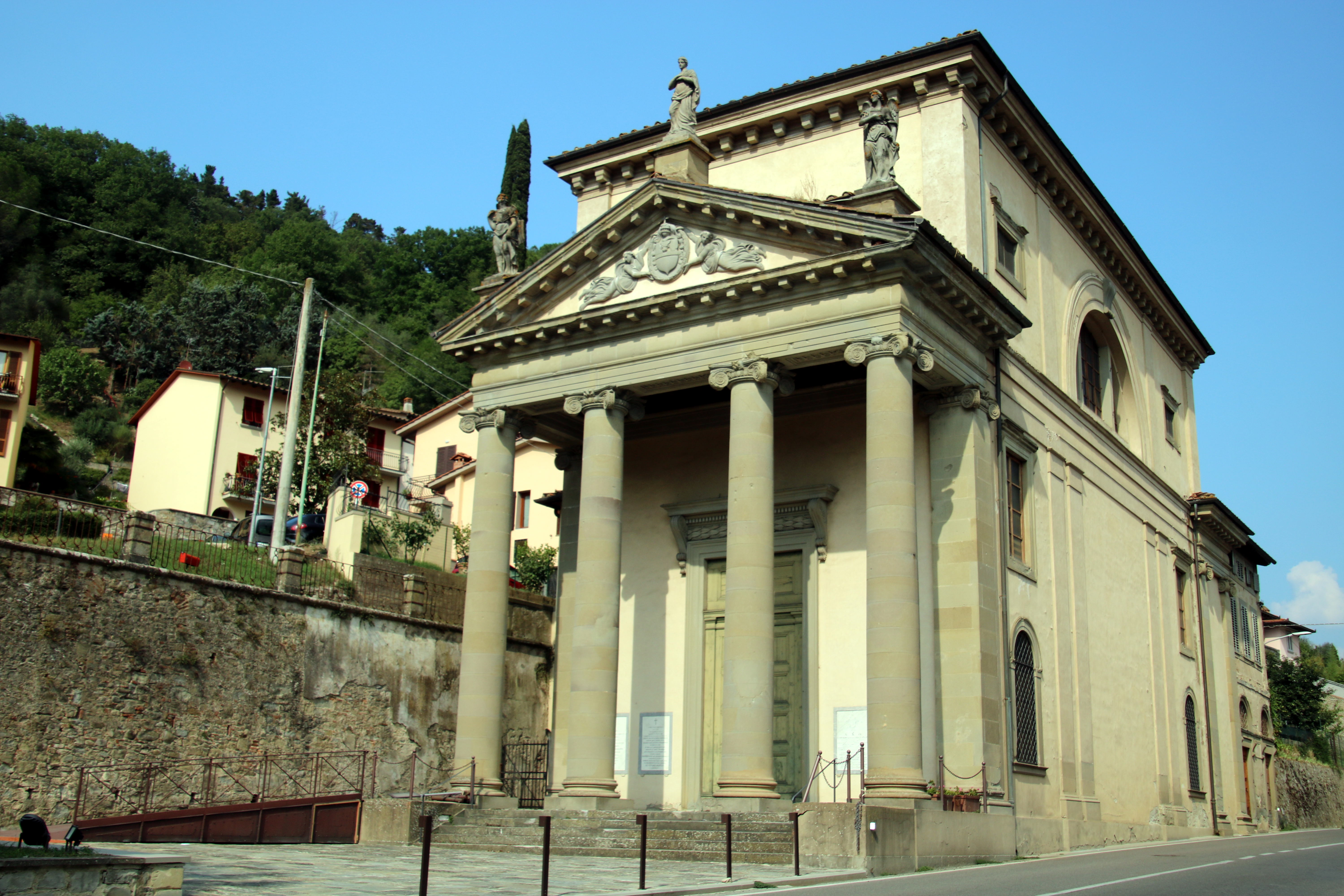
Giuseppe Del Rosso, Oratory of Sant'Onofrio, Dicomano

While the rest of Tuscany recorded the construction of few architectural works of formal and stylistic relevance (such as the new wing of the conservatory of San Niccolò, in which Giuseppe Valentini melded Neoclassicism with clear references to Mannerism), an interesting opportunity for comparison among architects occurred when the grand duke requested the project for the new building of the Cascine farm in Florence. In 1785 the experienced Paoletti and the young Giuseppe Manetti presented two different proposals: the former, attempting to combine elegance with economy, prepared a design for a building used as a stable and hayloft placed in the center of two farmhouses; the latter, showing greater inventiveness and an obvious link with the architectural aesthetics of the Enlightenment, conceived instead a large porticoed hemicycle, with a taller building hinged between the two semicircular arms, the whole bordered by two pronaos flanked by two conical icehouses. Paoletti's modest design, judged "miserable in idea," was discarded, while Manetti's, considered too wasteful, was approved in 1787 only after being extensively scaled down and simplified. Despite the limitations of the commission, Manetti succeeded in giving architectural dignity to the design of the central building through the inclusion of pierced pillars, the terracotta facing of the base portico, and the motifs of the ornamental roundels.

In 1790 Pietro Leopoldo left the government of Tuscany to assume the imperial investiture, and his son Ferdinand became grand duke in a period marked by great unrest. The only major construction site he managed to start was the one for the Livorno aqueduct, the work on which, begun in 1793 by Giuseppe Salvetti, suffered several interruptions and proceeded amid many difficulties. Even the arrangement of the Cascine park designed by Giuseppe Manetti, with the construction of the pyramid-shaped ice-house and the round aedicule of the "Pavoniere," are to be considered more as the completion of works begun in the Leopoldine era, rather than the actual initiatives of Grand Duke Ferdinand.

In domestic politics, the new grand duke did not repudiate his father's reforms that had brought Tuscany to the forefront in Europe, preceding in some fields even the French Revolution then in progress, but he tried to limit some of their excesses, especially in the religious sphere, with the restoration of outward practices of worship. With the return to the devotion of the saints, the architect Giuseppe Del Rosso, before devoting himself to the construction of the neo-Gothic chapel of Our Lady of Consolation in the cathedral of Arezzo, was commissioned by the Delle Pozze family to design the oratory of Sant'Onofrio, in Dicomano (1792); despite its modest dimensions, the oratory constitutes a true manifesto of Enlightenment architecture for Tuscany and is notable for its rigorous proportions, preceded by a tetrastyle Ionic pronaos and tympanum on the façade.

== The Napoleonic period (1799-1814) ==
In 1799 Ferdinand III was forced into exile in Vienna because of the precipitating political situation in the peninsula and the rise to power of Napoleon Bonaparte. The Bonapartist period conditioned the affairs of the region for about fifteen years. Tuscany, including the Principality of Lucca, experienced a radical transformation of institutions; the few years of the empire were enough to draft and start ambitious projects, which were completed after the restoration of the Lorraines and, in some cases, with the unification of Italy.

The Academy of Fine Arts in Florence was also reformed and joined by a conservatory of arts and crafts. In 1813, along with the most famous institutes in the empire, it was invited to submit a design for a monument to be erected on Mont-Cenis; among the entries admitted to the competition were Giuseppe Manetti's Colossus of the Eagle and the triumphal arch designed by the group formed by Giuseppe Del Rosso, Giuseppe Cacialli and Luigi de Cambray Digny.

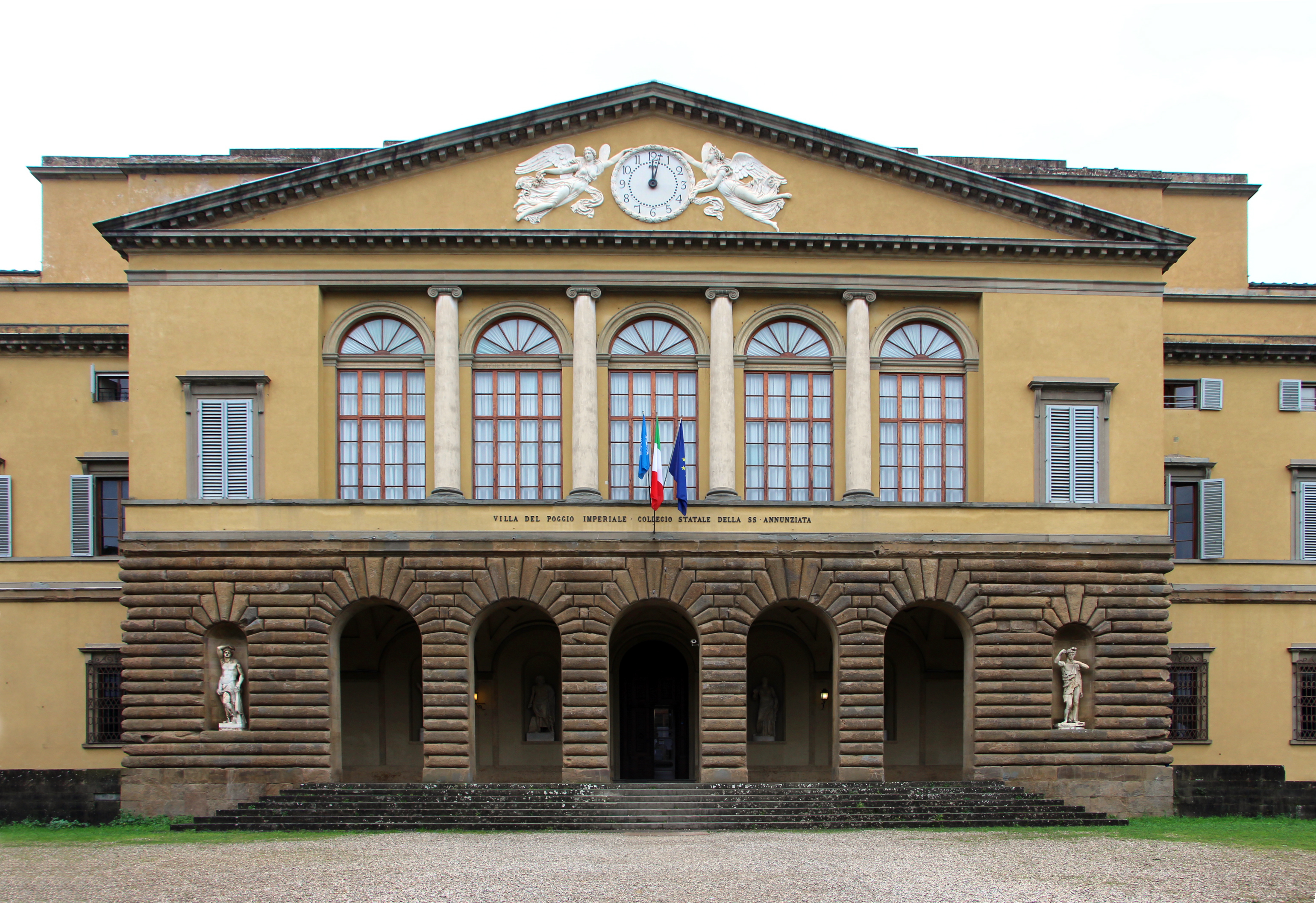
Pasquale Poccianti, facade of the Medici villa of Poggio Imperiale, Florence

Among them, Giuseppe Cacialli was the most successful architect during the years of Napoleonic rule. Surpassing his rival Pasquale Poccianti, who in 1809 was sent to Livorno as a community architect despite boasting greater seniority, Cacialli obtained the appointment as architect of the royal palaces and possessions, a body tasked with the maintenance of property passed from the Lorraine to Elisa Bonaparte Baciocchi. Early in his career he found himself collaborating with Poccianti in the extension of the Medici villa at Poggio Imperiale initiated by Gaspare Paoletti, but their respective contributions are nonetheless distinguishable: thus, while Poccianti is credited with the central part of the facade, Cacialli is credited with the bulk of the work. The author of academic and elegant decorative compositions, Cacialli was also distinguished for his work on the rearrangement of the Pitti Palace (Iliad Room, Hercules Room and Maria Theresa's bathroom) and the Napoleonic quarter of the Medici Riccardi Palace.

Whereas Giuseppe Del Rosso, appointed municipal architect in Florence, proved to be a modest planner and ranged from the restoration of ancient monuments to the design of the Pia Casa di Lavoro in Montedomini, in the "Department of the Ombrone," the few notable neoclassical architectural works of the period can be traced to the figure of Agostino Fantastici: notably, in Siena, the project for the transformation of the convent of Sant'Agostino into a lyceum (of which only the grandiose external portico would later be built) and, in Montalcino, the cathedral of the Santissimo Salvatore, which was designed from 1813 and built only during the Conservative Order.

In Pistoia, where the forms of Enlightenment classicism had been introduced by the Palazzo Vescovile Nuovo erected by Stefano Ciardi beginning in 1787, the contribution of a pupil of Paoletti's, Cosimo Rossi Melocchi, is noteworthy; his Pantheon of Illustrious Men, designed in 1811 and not completed until 1827 in much reduced form compared to the original plan, shows an adherence to the themes of revolutionary architecture in the rough elevation interrupted by a portico with massive Doric-order columns.

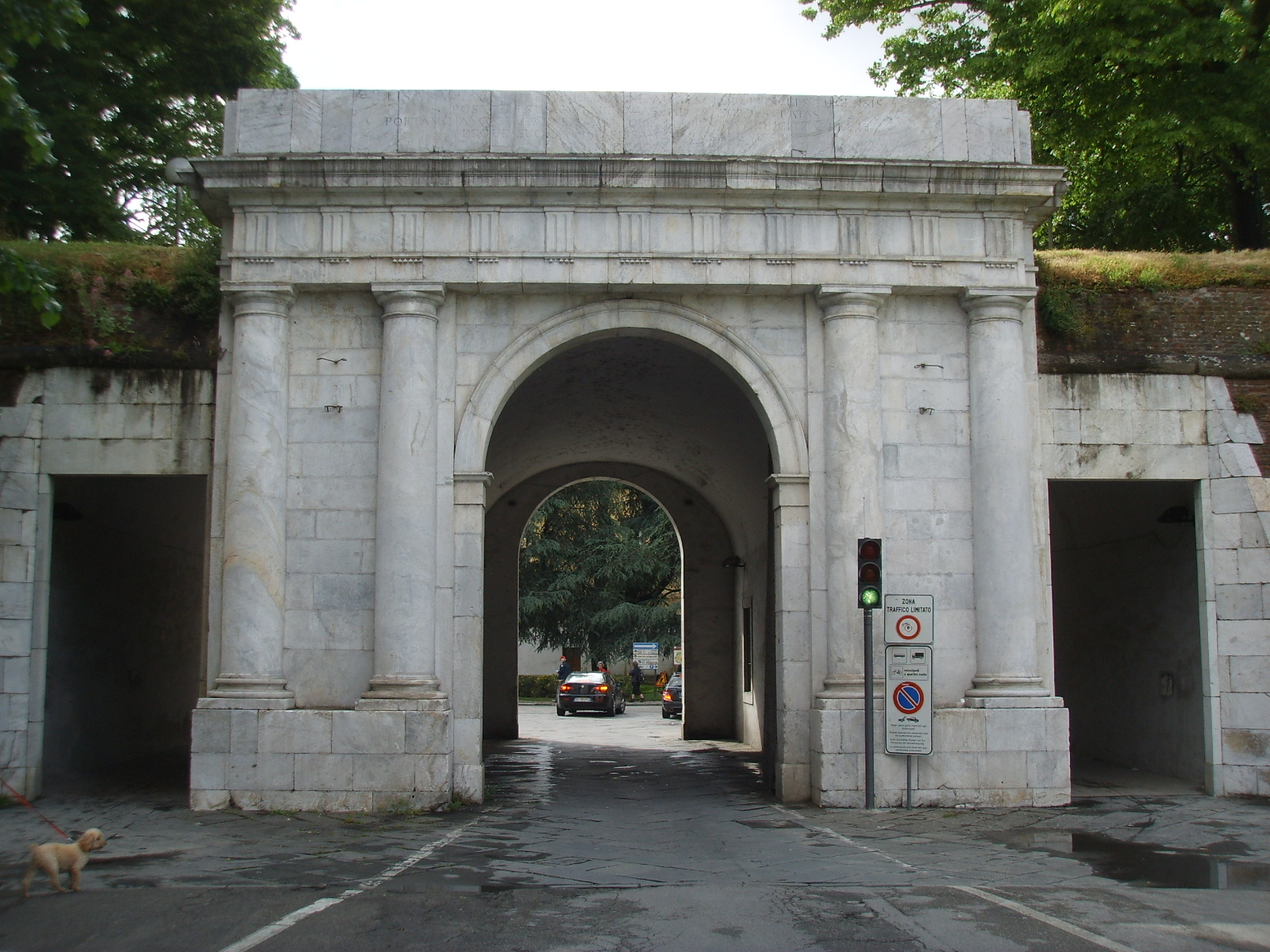
Giovanni Lazzarini, Porta Elisa, Lucca

A very lively cultural climate was experienced in Lucca; the city, subject to France but not part of the former territories of the Grand Duchy of Tuscany, became almost a model and a benchmark for the region's Napoleonic-era town planning. In 1805 Élisa Baciocchi obtained control of the Principality of Lucca and Piombino, to which the territories of Massa and Carrara were later annexed. During the administration of the future Grand Duchess of Tuscany, the towns of Carrara, Viareggio and Bagni di Lucca were enlarged, while under the guidance of architect Giovanni Lazzarini, often assisted by Théodhore Bienaimé, a series of important construction sites were started: the construction of Piazza Napoleone, achieved by gutting a substantial portion of Lucca's historic center; the opening of a gate in the shape of a triumphal arch and a connecting road dedicated to Élisa; the renovation, in a neoclassical style, of the summer residence of Marlia; the enlargement of the cemetery outside the San Donato gate; the transformation of some religious complexes to other uses; and the design of the Teatro del Giglio, work on which began in 1817.

Along with Lazzarini, a number of other architects gravitated to Lucca. In 1812 Pasquale Poccianti, who in those same years was engaged in the completion of Livorno's aqueduct, was also called to Elisa Baciocchi's court, but his contribution was limited to a few projects of monumental urban structures in the neoclassical style, which, moreover, did not find implementation.

== From the Conservative Order to Unification (1814-1860) ==
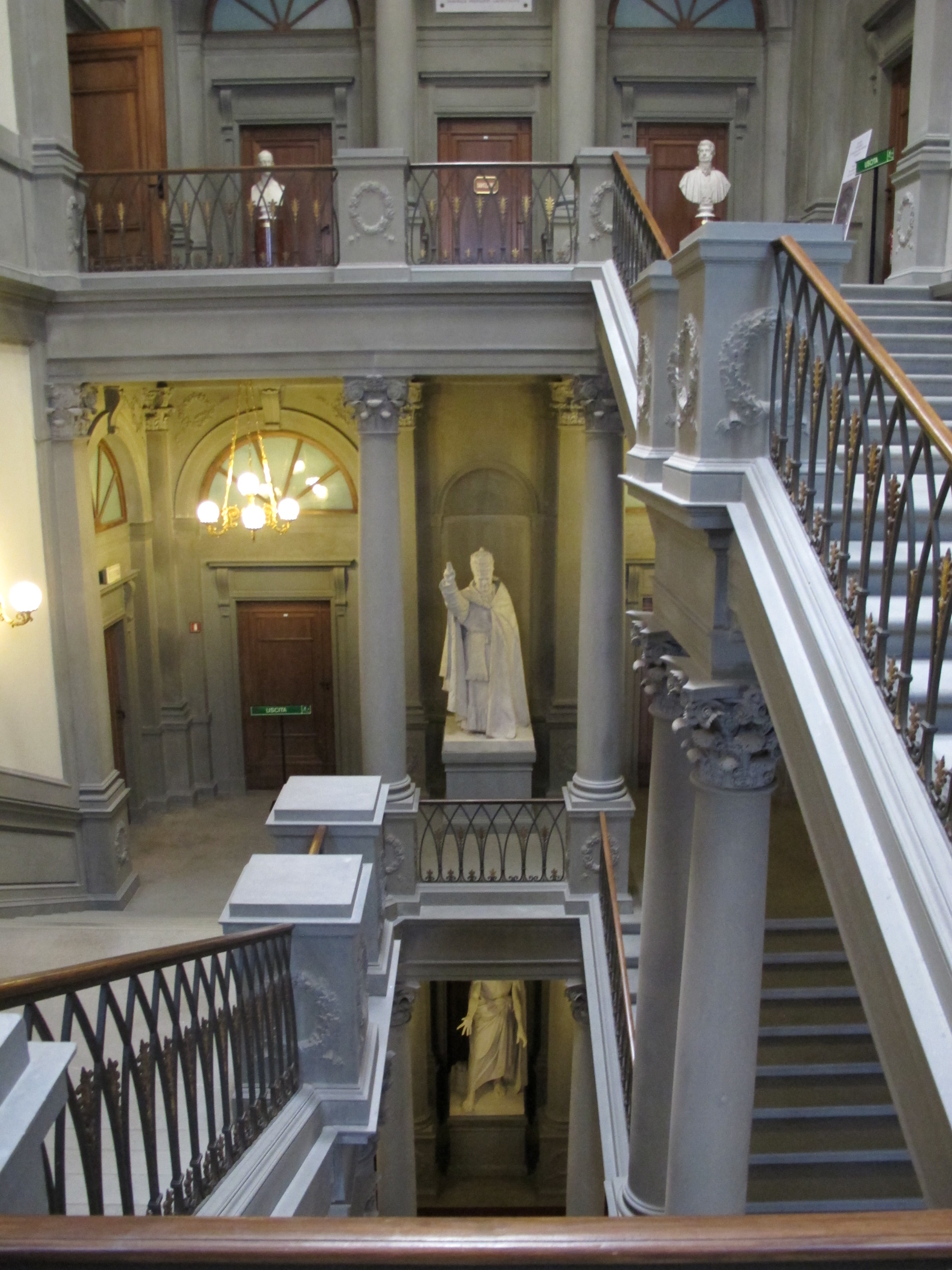
Pasquale Poccianti, monumental staircase of the Pitti Palace, Florence

With the Conservative Order, that generation of talented architects trained at the Academy of Fine Arts in Florence under Gaspare Paoletti became the protagonists of a particularly dense and interesting period for the Grand Duchy of Tuscany.

Upon his return to Tuscany in September 1814, Grand Duke Ferdinand III set up a major program for the construction of works of public utility: for example, new roads were built in the territory of Arezzo, the new aqueduct came into operation in Livorno (1816), the road system in Maremma was upgraded, and the vast and functional Dogana delle Filigare was erected on the Bolognese road to the design of Luigi de Cambray Digny (1818).

In several cities, old blocks were demolished to open new squares. In Florence, in 1824 Gaetano Baccani prepared the plan for the enlargement of the Piazza del Duomo, with the creation of a vague portico of neoclassical style on the south side; statues of Arnolfo di Cambio and Filippo Brunelleschi were inserted in the central loggia of the new Palazzo dei Canonici on the cathedral's southern flank to celebrate the values and protagonists of local culture. Alongside this project and the initiatives for the continuation of Via Cavour, there is the one for the widening of Via dei Calzaiuoli, which was approved, with several modifications, only in 1842. With the same criterion, in Pisa, the old monastery of San Lorenzo was demolished in order to create the Piazza Santa Caterina (completed in 1827 by Alessandro Gherardesca), the old Monumental Cemetery was rearranged into a museum, and a section of the Lungarno was laid out. In Arezzo, with the work on the road to Ancona, plans were made to regularize and connect the two levels of Piazza Sant'Agostino and to place a statue there, later actually erected in Piazza Grande.

Still in Florence, the Goldoni theater was inaugurated in 1817, and a few years later Giuseppe Martelli was engaged in the transformation into a girls' boarding school of the former monastery of the Santissima Concezione, inside which it is worth mentioning the very refined spiral staircase in pietra serena surmounted by a lead caryatid, which the sculptor Luigi Pampaloni placed at the top of the central column to give stability to the structure. In addition, the Royal Loggia (1821) was built to the design of Luigi de Cambray Digny, while Pasquale Poccianti, promoted first architect of the royal buildings by Ferdinand III and destined to establish himself as the principal architect of the Grand Duchy of Tuscany, became interested in the construction of the new staircase and vestibule of the Pitti Palace, the connecting corridor to the Specola rooms, completed the Palazzina della Meridiana with the design of the southern façade, and built the Sala d'Elci for the expansion of the Biblioteca Medicea Laurenziana. While Renaissance memories converge in the neoclassical code of Poccianti's three-aisled vestibule and staircase characterized by superimposed columns, for the addition of the Michelangelo library the architect resorted to the insertion of a refined neoclassical rotunda, without, however, seeking any connection with the pre-existing structure.

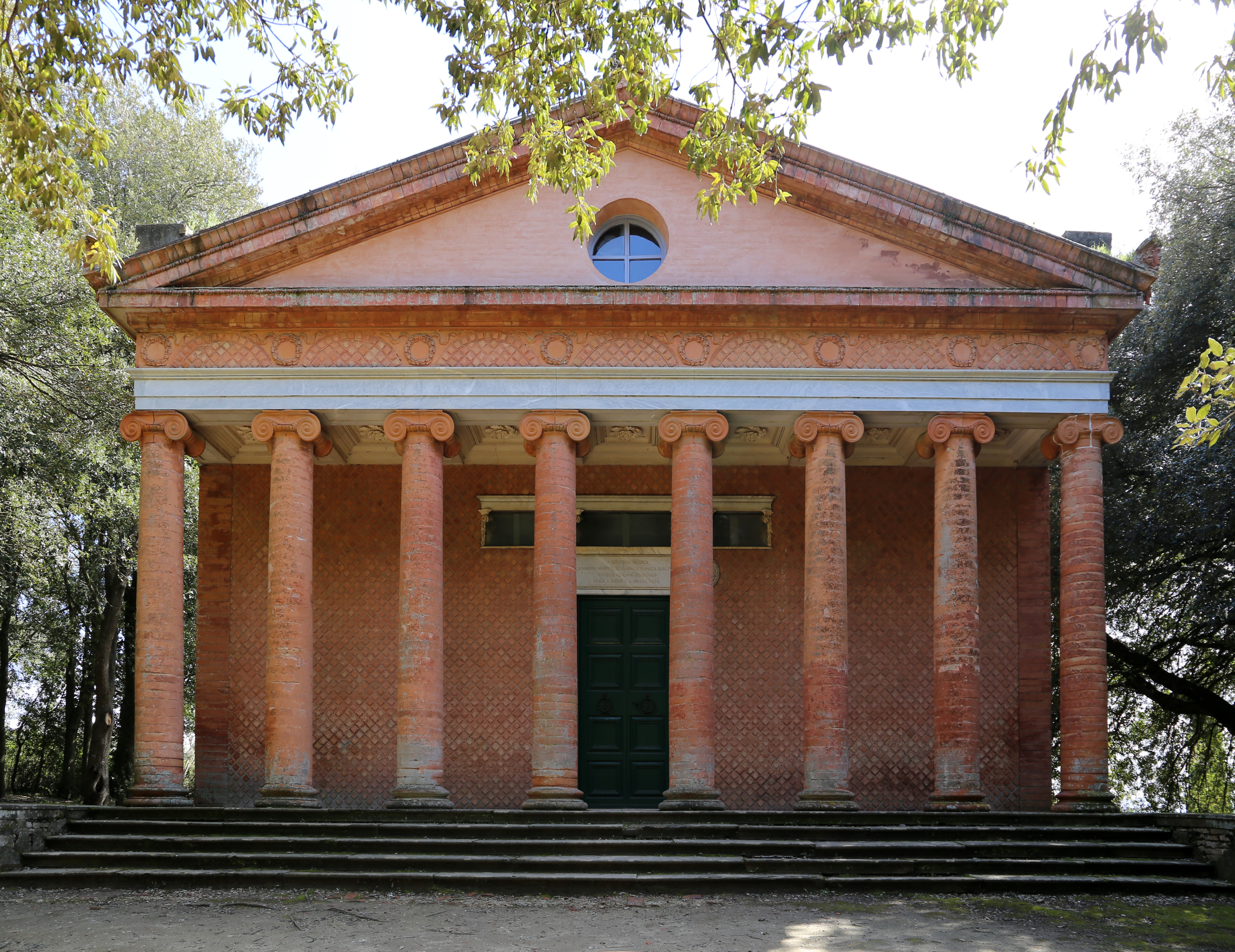
Rodolfo Castinelli, temple of Minerva Medica, Montefoscoli

Private initiatives include the palace on Via Ghibellina (1821), commissioned by Prince Gaetano Borghese from Gaetano Baccani, where the imposing rustic facade surmounted by a slender Ionic colonnade stands out. To the same period date roughly the Pantheon built inside Villa Puccini of Scornio in Pistoia, probably the work in which the language of the eclectic Alessandro Gherardesca reached the purest neoclassical quality for the lightness and harmony of the whole, and the grandiose Villa San Donato in Novoli, designed by Giovan Battista Silvestri for the Demidoff family.

Also interesting is the figure of Rodolfo Castinelli, who, after designing the ballroom of the Goldoni theater with neoclassical style, built the temple of Minerva Medica of Montefoscoli in memory of Andrea Vaccà Berlinghieri's father, drawing with ease on Roman and Etruscan archaeological memories.

This revivalistic liveliness, which looked to distant iconographic repertoires of local tradition, also emerges in the twin monuments of Volterra designed by Giuseppe Del Rosso in 1830 (with dolphins and herms of Janus) and in the wooden chair, in the Empire style and with neo-Egyptian inserts of Piranesian style, that Agostino Fantastici designed for the University of Siena.

In any case, most of these architects did not exclusively adhere to the neoclassical style, but, in parallel, devoted themselves to designing works in the neo-Gothic style, with a revaluation, typical of Romanticism, of the anticlassical repertoire: on the one hand, neoclassical architecture corresponded to the ambitions of the restored monarchies, while on the other hand, neo-medievalism presaged an evolution in the concept of the redemption of national autonomy.

Meanwhile, Lucca and its territories, united in a state independent from the rest of the Grand Duchy of Tuscany until its annexation in 1847, also witnessed the realization of a series of public works. In 1818 Lorenzo Nottolini, who had been a pupil of Giovanni Lazzarini, assumed the appointment of royal architect; he was also active as a restorer, urban planner, and hydraulic engineer, also receiving commissions from private individuals. His contributions include: the aqueduct (1822-1833), the Orsetti chapel in the suburban cemetery (1824), the Monastery of the Angel, the Villa Borbone in Viareggio, and the Catene bridge near Bagni di Lucca.

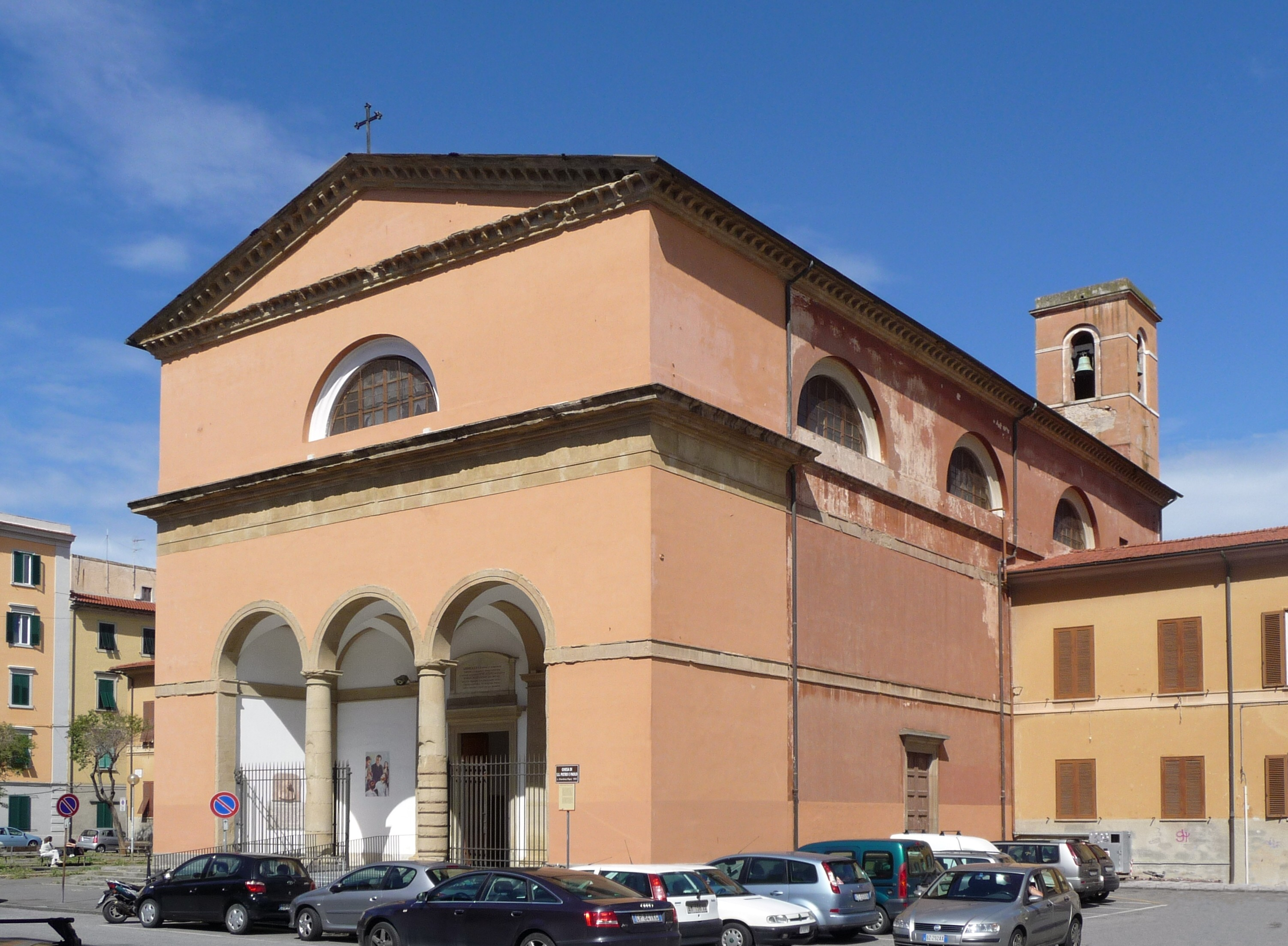
Luigi de Cambray Digny, Church of Saints Peter and Paul, Livorno

However, it was Livorno, a free port of the Grand Duchy of Tuscany animated by intense cultural exchanges with foreign countries, the city in which Restoration Neoclassicism achieved its best results; an affirmation that coincided with Leopold II's ascension to government (1824-1859) and the founding of the local "School of Architecture, Ornament and Surveying" (1825).

The ambitions of a growing city were reflected in the design and construction of important public utilities. For the new quarter of Casone, south of the city, Cambray Digny hypothesized the opening of a gateway on the southern bastion of the Medici curtain wall, envisaging, on the outside, a regular street scheme; according to the indications contained in the plan, the church of Saints Peter and Paul (1829) was built on the edge of the new settlement, in which the neoclassical themes of the façade are diluted in the portico with round arches derived from 15th-century Tuscan architecture. Soon after, the transformations extended to the rectification of the surrounding ditch and the demolition of the ancient Medici walls, with the expansion of the free port area. However, the motion of expansion of the city, exemplified by the vast Piazza dei Granduchi built by Luigi Bettarini to connect the historic center to the Lorraine suburbs, was countered by the limit set by the new customs wall designed by Alessandro Manetti (1835-1842); the original compositions of the customs gates are, however, due to Carlo Reishammer, who took up some of the stylistic features of Ledoux's architecture, juxtaposing canopies, staircases, pillars and other ornamental cast-iron elements.

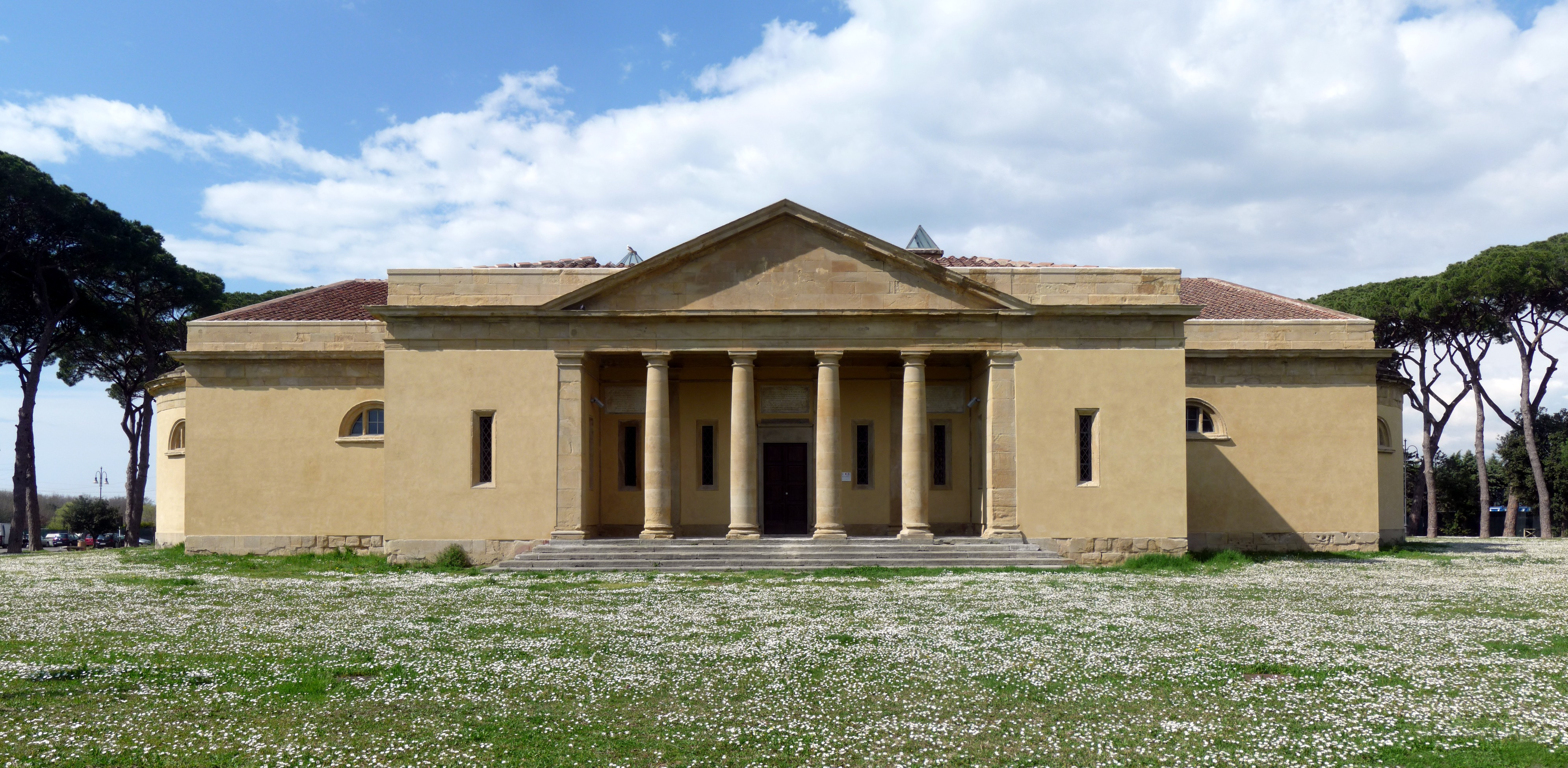
Pasquale Poccianti, Cisternino di Pian di Rota, Livorno

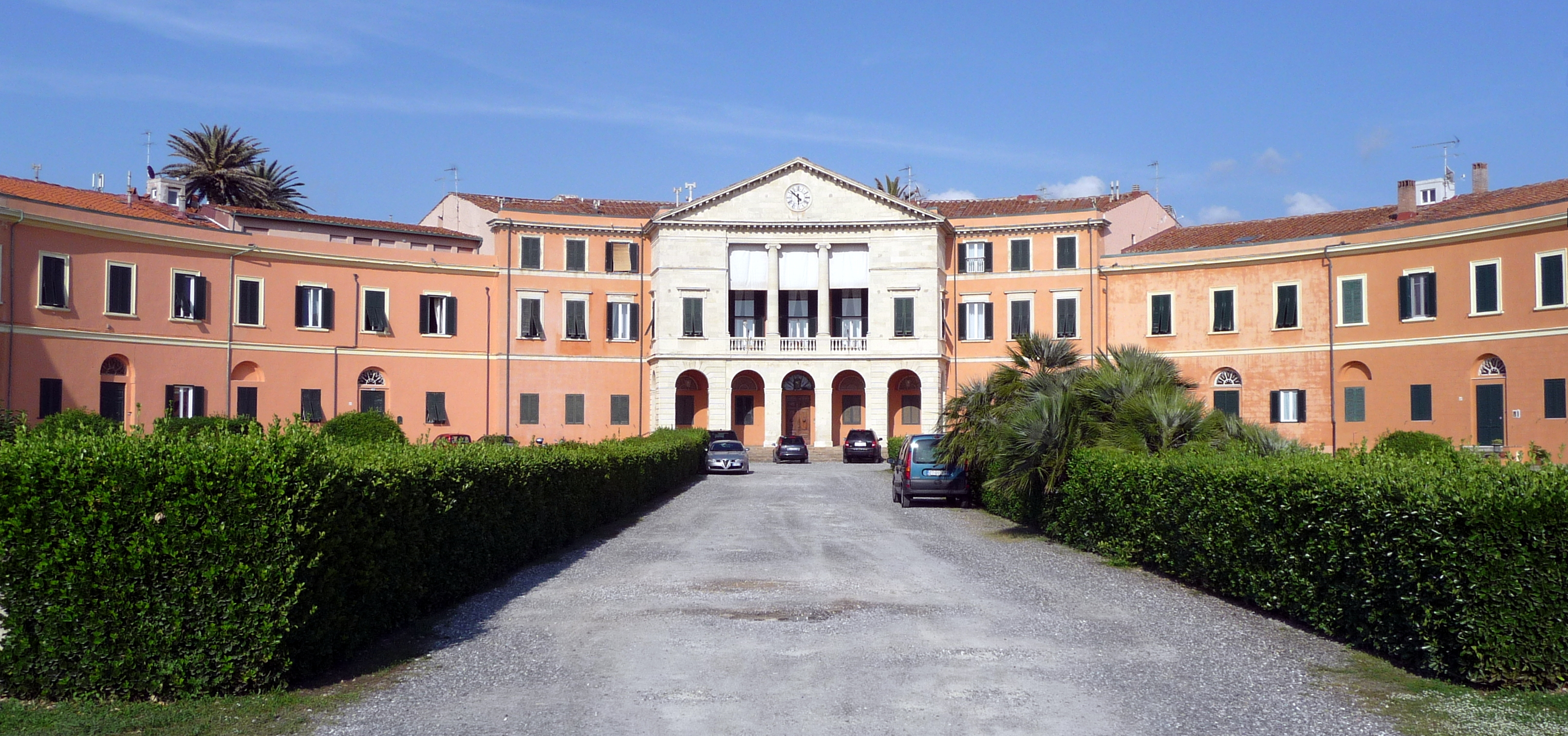
Giuseppe Cappellini, Casini d'Ardenza, Livorno

At the same time, Poccianti devoted himself to the works necessary to upgrade the aqueduct completed a few years earlier; the architect's attentions focused mainly on the design of several reservoirs intended for water storage and filtration: the Purgatorio di Pian di Rota (1841-1852), characterized by a strongly dilated layout marked by two semicircular exedras at either end and a stern Tuscan pronaos on the façade; his masterpiece, the Cisternone (1829-1842), with the portico surmounted a "revolutionary" semi-dome decorated with coffers, which translates into reality the daring inventions of Étienne-Louis Boullée and Claude-Nicolas Ledoux; the Cisternino di città (completed around 1848), with a basilica plan and a slender loggia raised above the massive basement. Altogether, these are three buildings arising from the union of elementary geometric volumes, where French influences are combined with an evident knowledge of Roman thermal architecture and the Tuscan architectural tradition. Moreover, in the architect's intentions (later, in fact scaled down in the execution phase), the aqueduct work was supposed to be accessible from the city to the springs, in a sort of didactic route through tunnels, arches and inspection huts built in the forms of neoclassical temples.

Other architects who worked in Livorno, such as Gaetano Gherardi, Giuseppe Puini, Giuseppe Cappellini and Angiolo della Valle, were influenced by Poccianti. Gherardi, a professor at the local "School of Architecture, Ornamentation and Surveying," was responsible for the large church of Soccorso (1836) with Brunelleschian references, the church of Sant'Andrea and the adjoining Girolamo Gavi Seminary; Puini was responsible for the church of San Giuseppe (1839), with the lacunar splay on the façade reminiscent of that of the Cisternone; at Cappellini, the Casini d'Ardenza, an original composition built in the 1940s as part of the renewal of Livorno's seafront, and the Goldoni theater (1843-1847), characterized by a glazed roof for daytime performances and the only one among Tuscan theaters to present itself with an important formal exterior appearance conferred by the majestic carriage porch; at Della Valle, the church of San Giorgio and the new English cemetery (1839). Also worth mentioning in this context are the vast plans, which remained on paper, prepared by Cambray Digny and Giuseppe Martelli for the new hospital (1832) and the covered market in Livorno (1849), respectively; outsized gigantism took shape instead in the Pia Casa di Lavoro begun on a design by Alessandro Gherardesca in 1845 and later completed by Angiolo della Valle.

Beginning in the 1840s, there was a certain amount of activity in Florence as well: the start of work on the extension of Via dei Calzaiuoli, the approval of the plan for the new Barbano quarter (1842), the reorganization of the Lungarni, the opening of the Leopolda and Maria Antonia Stations, and the construction of the heavy Stock Exchange building, designed by Michelangelo Maiorfi and Emilio De Fabris along the course of the Arno River. This included the inauguration of the Tribune of Galileo, a room located inside the Specola Museum (1841); designed by Giuseppe Martelli and characterized by a bright polychromy and an overabundance of ornamental elements, it constitutes a mirror of a neoclassical style now oriented toward eclecticism, especially when compared with Poccianti's austere addition for the Laurentian Library, also inaugurated in the same year.

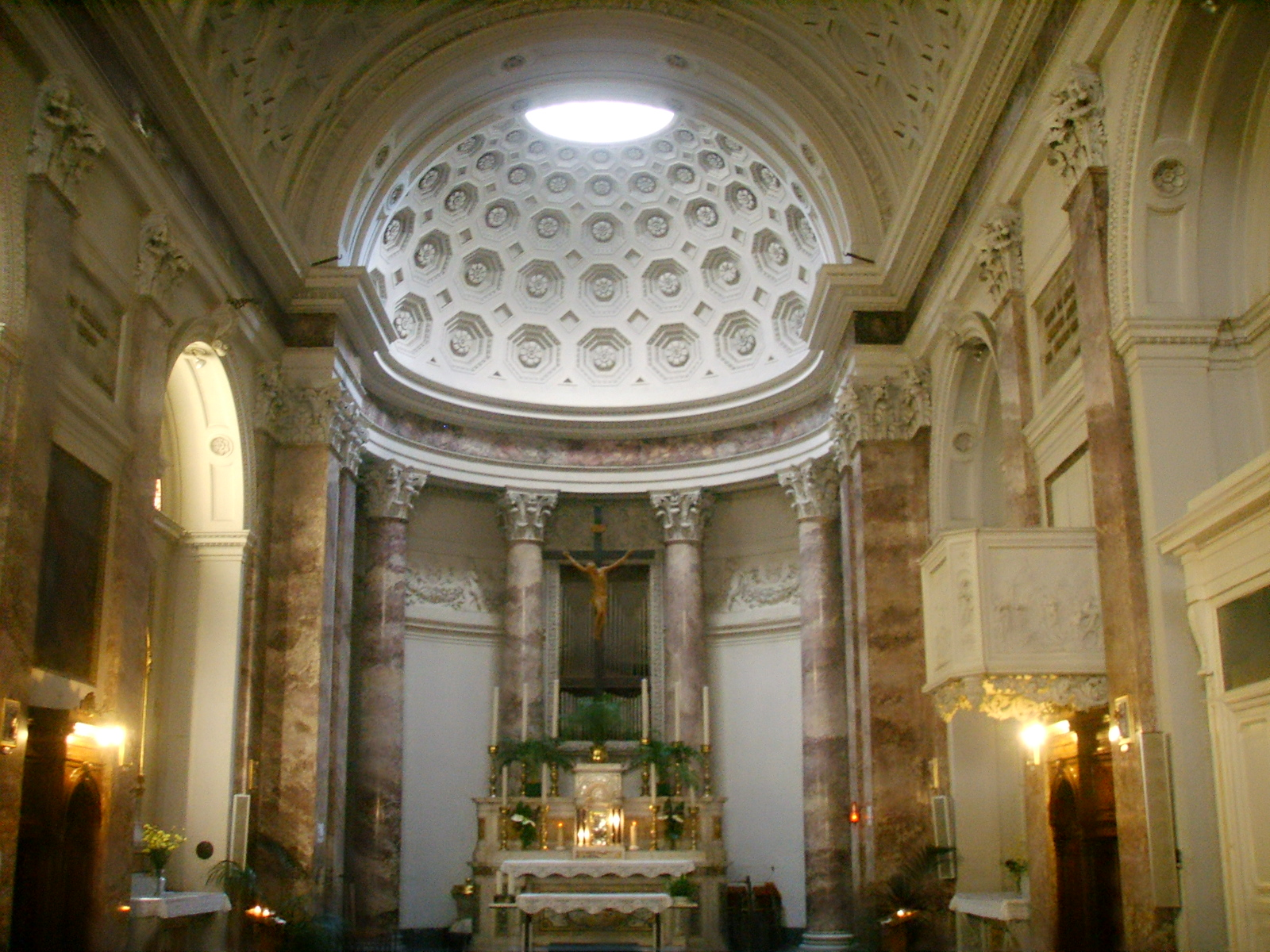
Torello Niccolai and Angelo Pacchiani, church of San Pier Forelli, Prato

Other cities in the grand duchy also witnessed intense building and urban planning activity. These include the church of Santa Maria Assunta in Montecatini (1833) and the rectory of Saints Giusti and Clemente (1842-1845), designed respectively by Luigi De Cambray Digny and Agostino Fantastici by resorting to tetrastyle porticoes of the Ionic order; the facade of the oratory of San Francesco in Bibbiena (1829), by Nicolò Matas; and the elevation of the church of San Giovanni Evangelista in Ponsacco (1832-1836), by Alessandro Gherardesca; the church of San Pier Forelli (1838) in Prato, by Torello Niccolai and Angelo Pacchiani; the Teatro Petrarca in Arezzo (opened in 1833), by Vittorio Bellini; the Teatro Metastasio in Prato (completed in 1830), designed again by Cambray Digny; the Palazzo del Tribunale, in Pontremoli (1840), by Angiolo Cianferoni; the Teatro degli Animosi, built in Carrara to a design by Giuseppe Pardini (1840); the Napoleonic Museum at Villa di San Martino on Elba Island (1851), designed by Matas for Anatoly Demidov.

With the development of industrial activities, it is worth noting the increasing use of metallurgical products, which found use especially in the construction of bridges, such as the suspended bridge at Poggio a Caiano (1833) by Alessandro Manetti and those at San Ferdinando and San Leopoldo in Florence, by the Séguin brothers. Alongside these works of engineering is the church of San Leopoldo in Follonica, a work by Reishammer characterized by numerous cast-iron elements, such as the pronaos, the façade rose window, the apse, the tip of the bell tower and some interior furnishings (1838), which together with the Porta San Marco in Livorno, also by Reishammer, heralds new and striking scenarios in the field of architecture.

== After the unification of Italy ==
The election of Florence as the capital of the Kingdom of Italy marked the watershed, in Tuscany, between Neoclassicism and neo-Renaissance eclecticism.

The task of updating the image of the new capital, with a series of urban and architectural interventions in order to adapt the city to its function, was entrusted to Giuseppe Poggi, who had been a pupil of Pasquale Poccianti. Poggi took care of every detail, from the detailed plans down to the architectural scale, giving it an imprint that ran between an adherence to Neoclassicism and a natural reference to Renaissance models. The most significant part of his entire work is the hilly expansion of the city, with the Viale dei Colli and Piazzale Michelangelo, conceived as a belvedere over the city. There he built a loggia according to neoclassical and neo-16th-century canons, which was to form part of a Michelangelo museum.

Between 1885 and 1895 there was also the redevelopment of the historic center; an operation outside the Poggi plan that led to the gutting of the area around the old market, with the construction of new blocks, quite anonymous and undifferentiated, in neoclassical and neo-Renaissance styles. After all, after the unification of Italy, Tuscan and, more generally, Italian architecture turned toward a line that exalted what was considered the national style par excellence, namely that of the Renaissance; a predominantly secular architecture, embodied by the typology of the sixteenth-century palace, which was perfectly suited to the rapid expansion of the cities.

== Other images ==
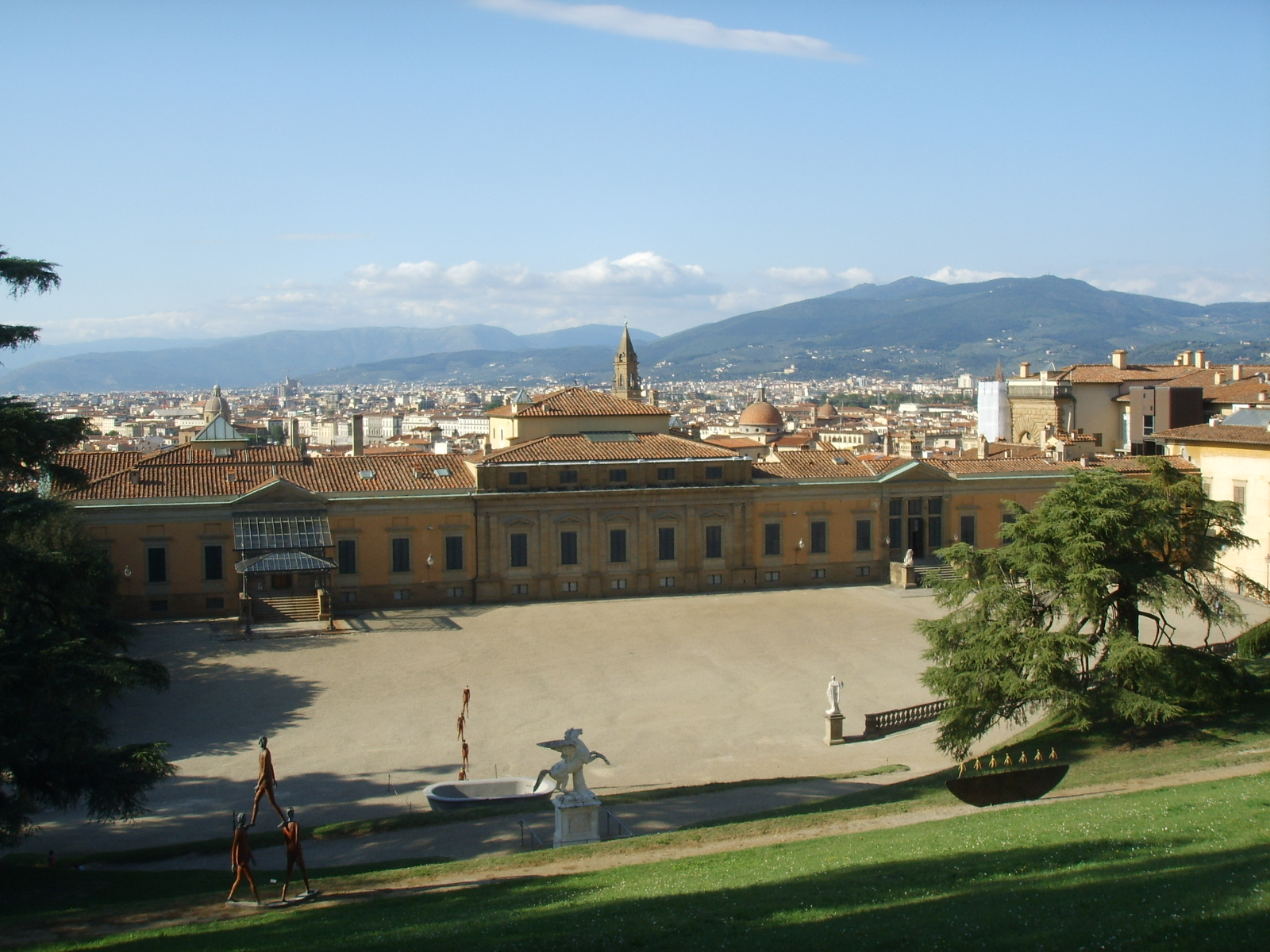
Gaspare Paoletti, Palazzina della Meridiana, Florence

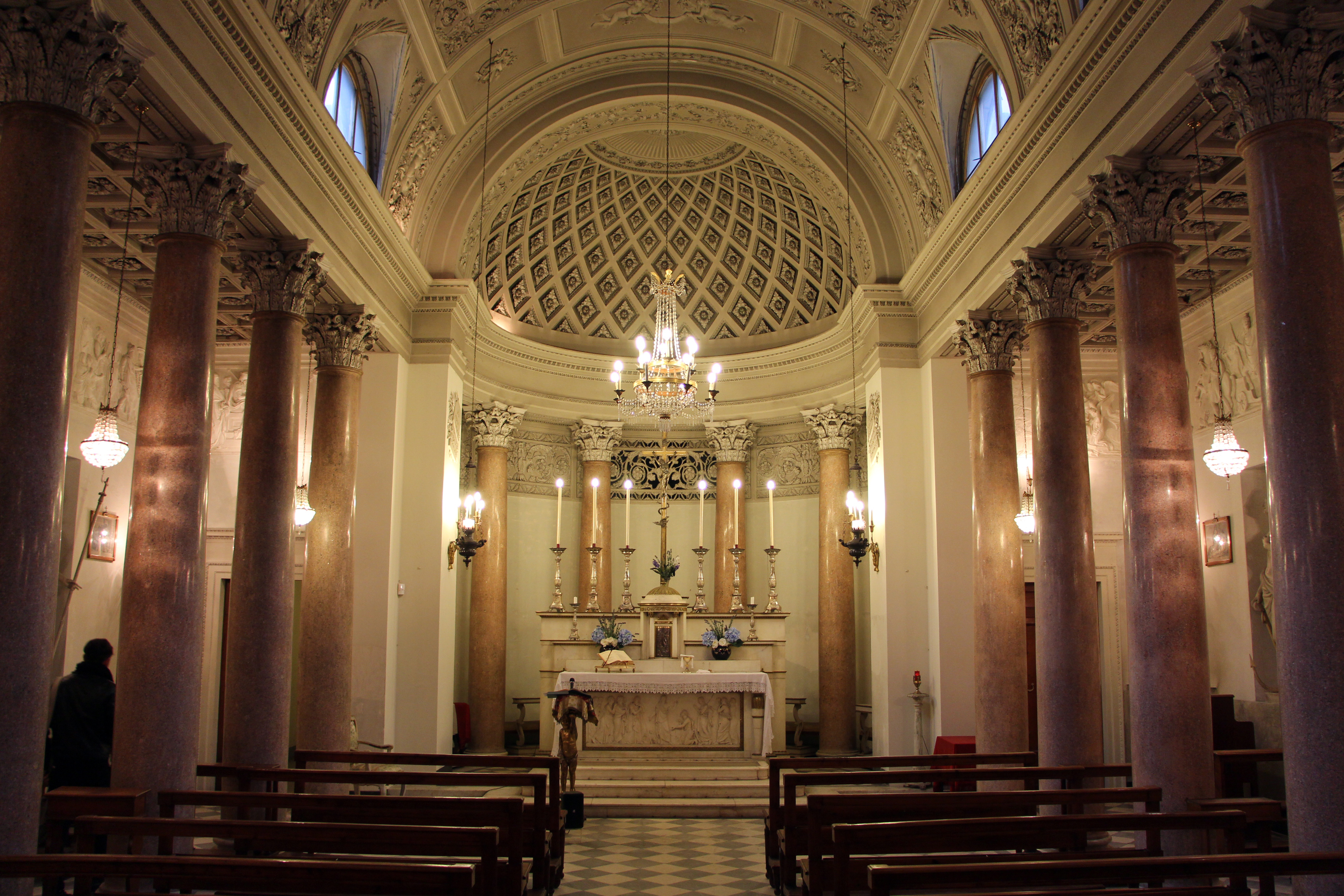
Giuseppe Cacialli, chapel of the Medici villa of Poggio Imperiale, Florence

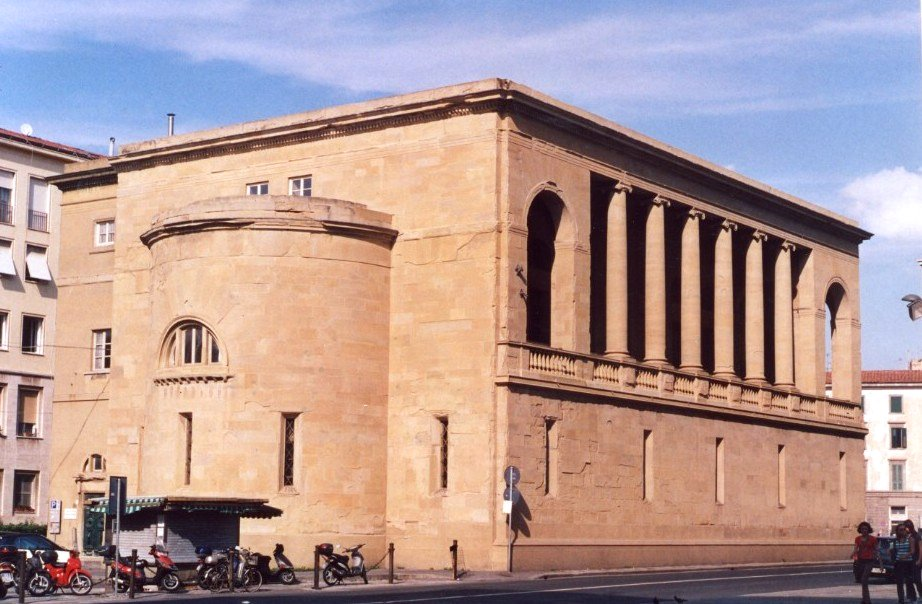
Pasquale Poccianti, Cisternino di città, Livorno

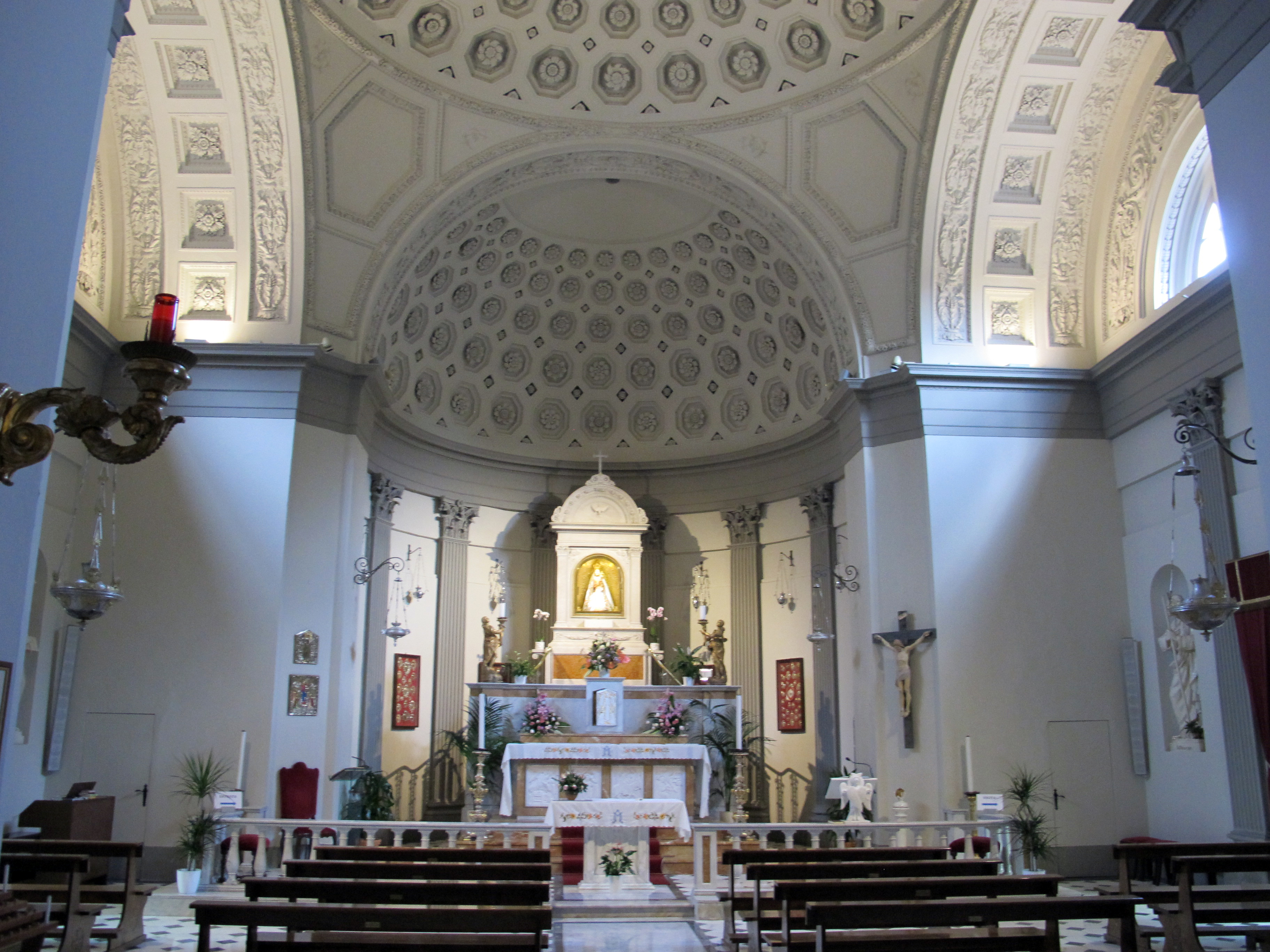
Pasquale Poccianti, Chapel of the Holy Virgin, San Romano

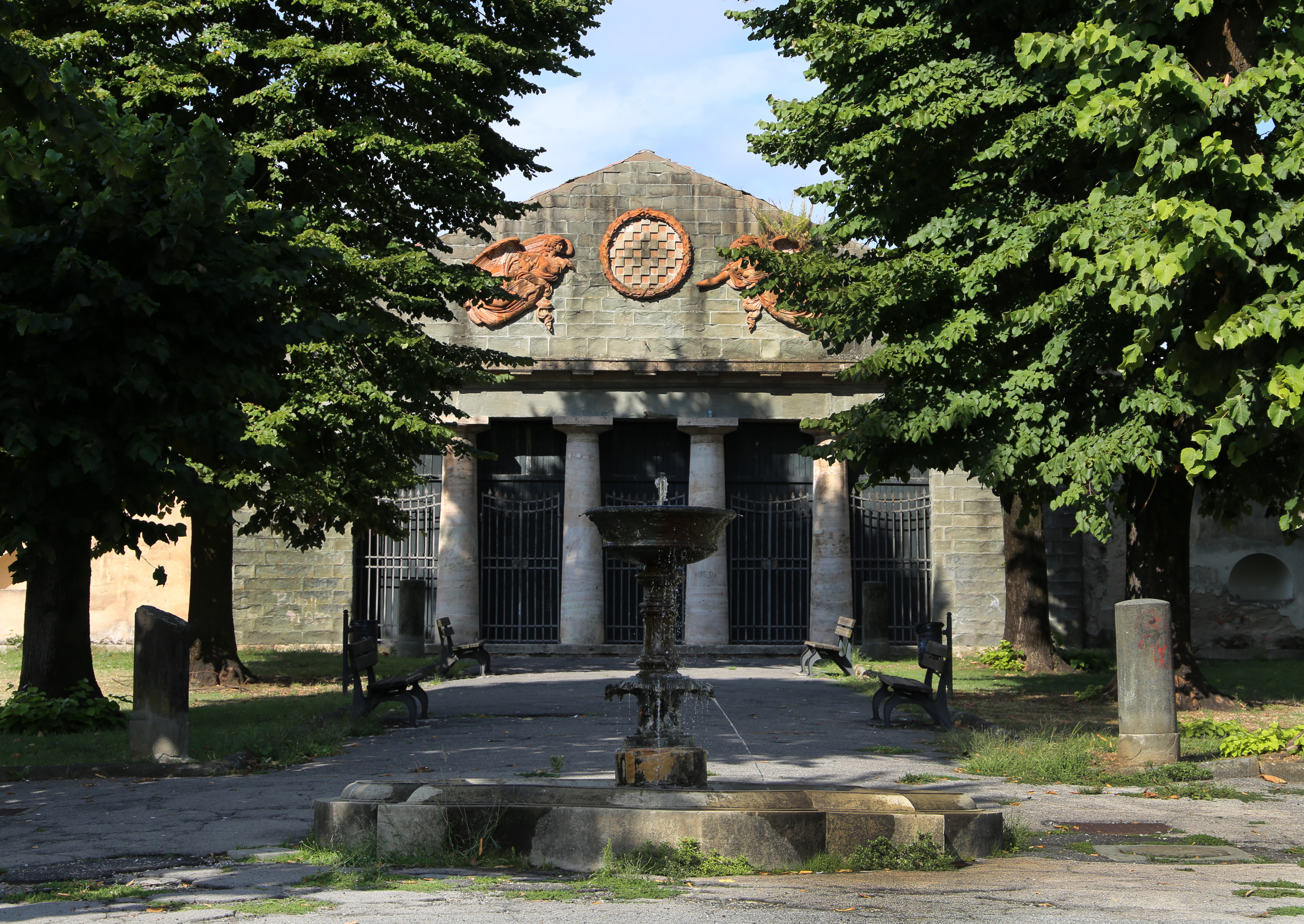
Cosimo Rossi Melocchi, Pantheon of Illustrious Men, Pistoia

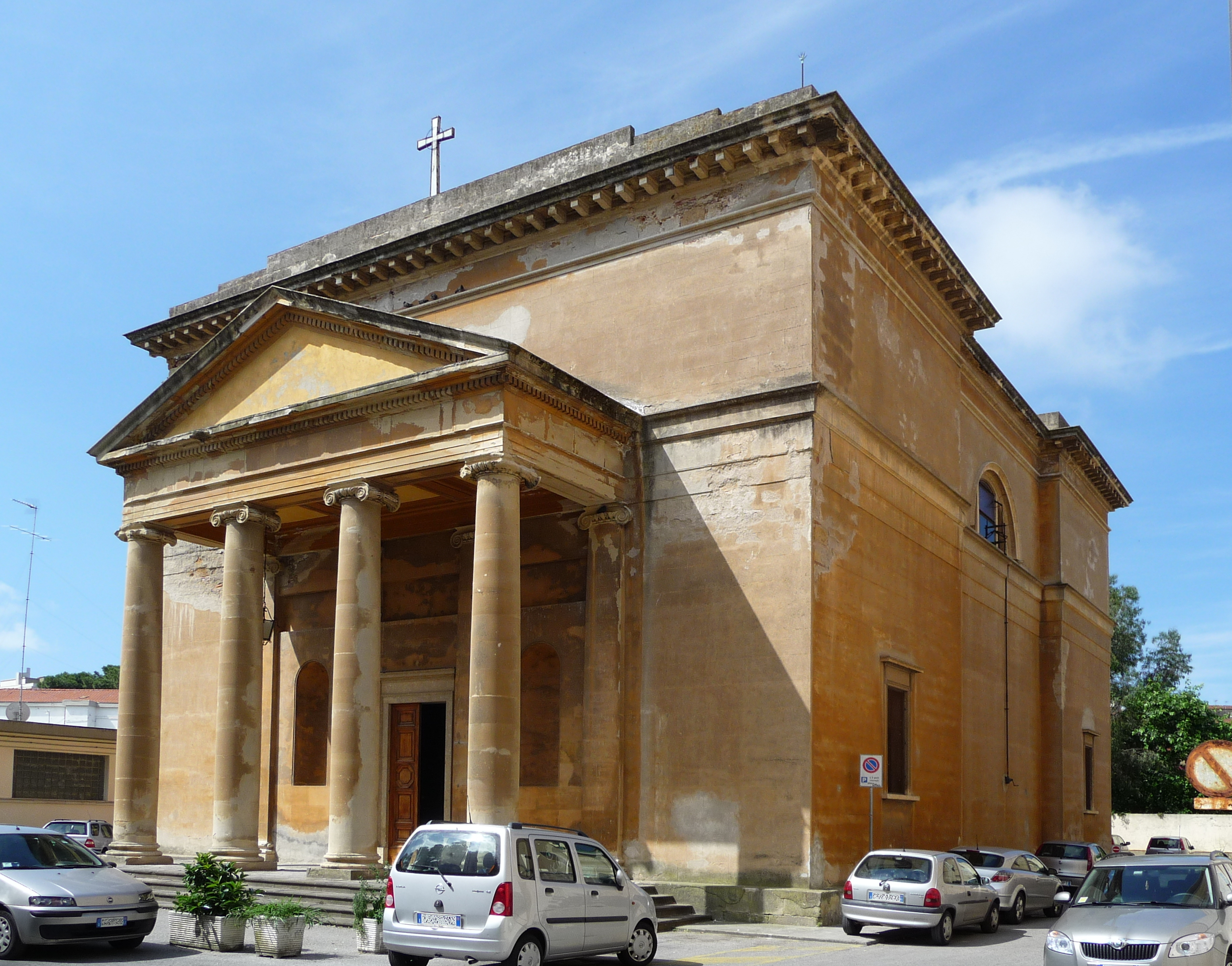
Angiolo della Valle, church of San Giorgio, Livorno

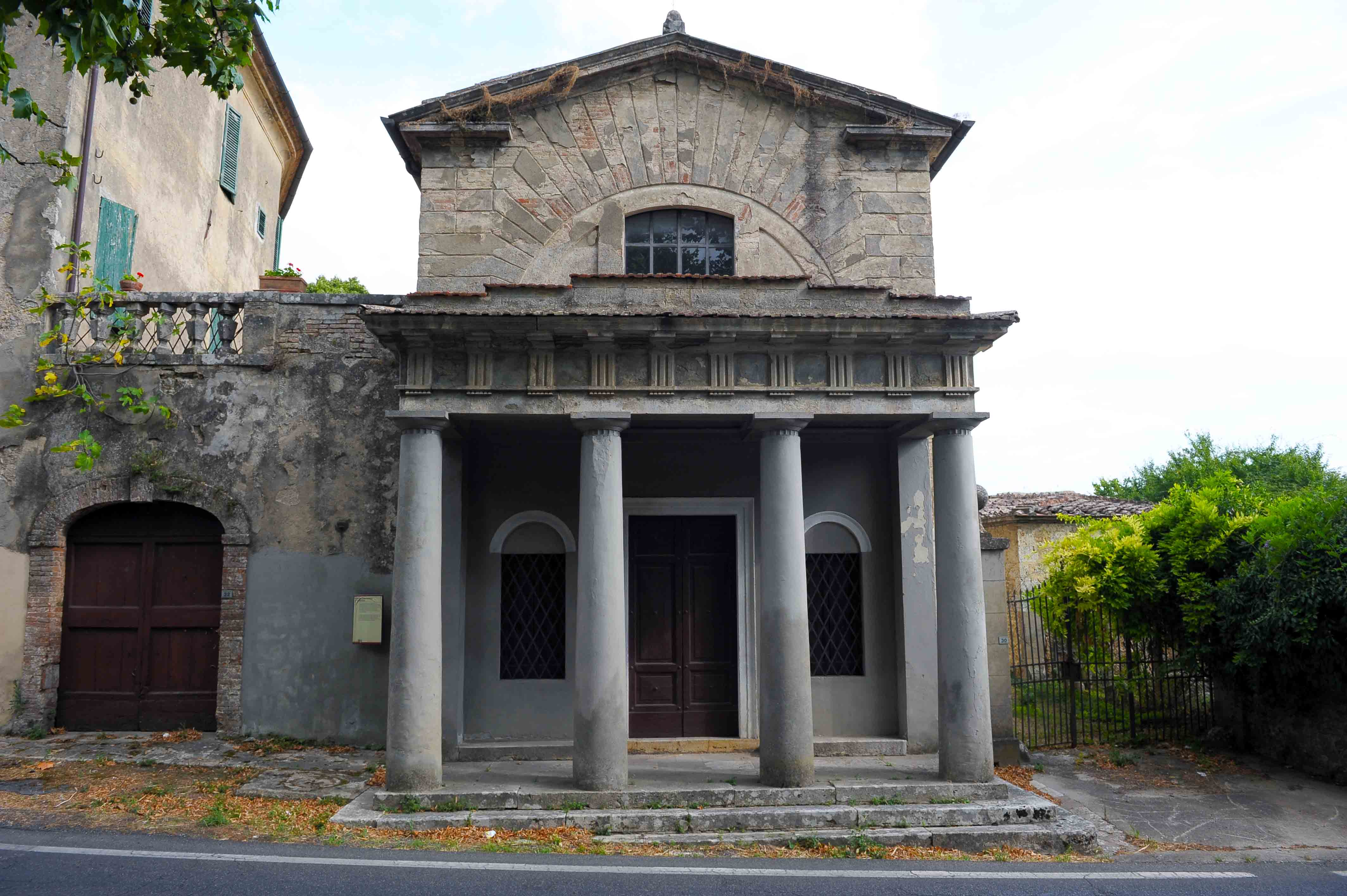
Agostino Fantastici, chapel of the Malignano Farm, Sovicille

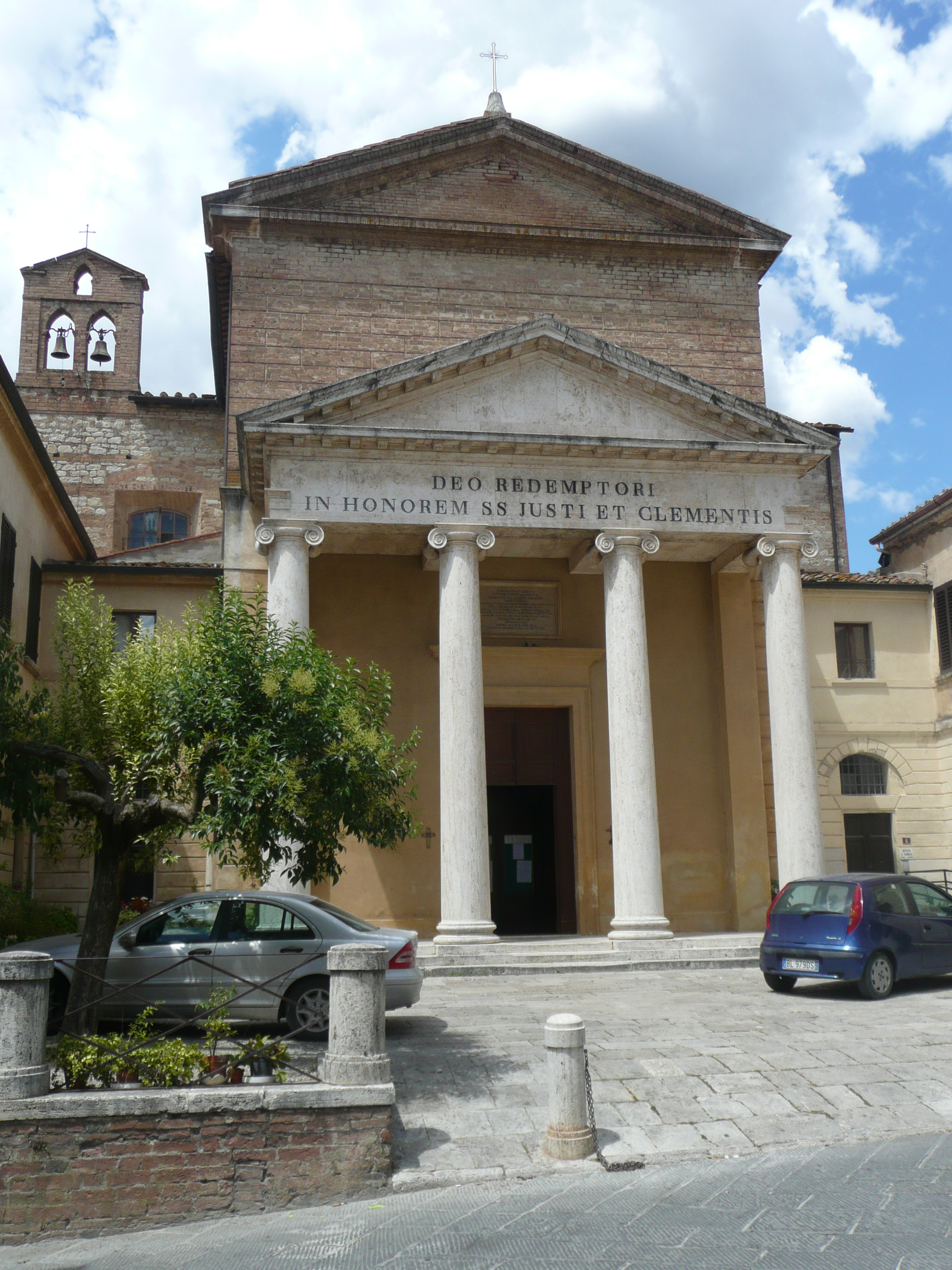
Agostino Fantastici, rectory of Saints Justus and Clement, Castelnuovo Berardenga

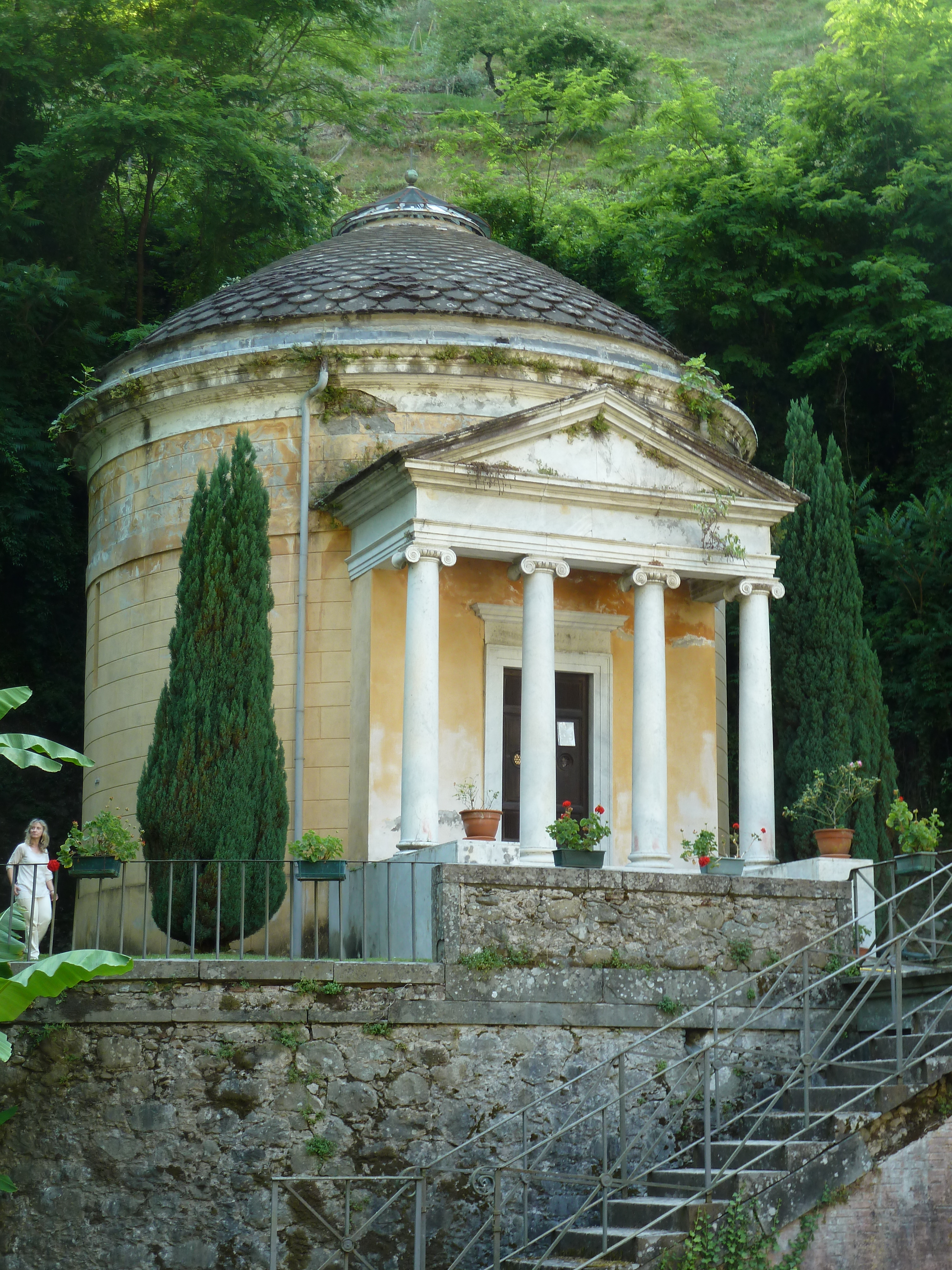
Giacomo Marracci, Demidoff Chapel, Bagni di Lucca

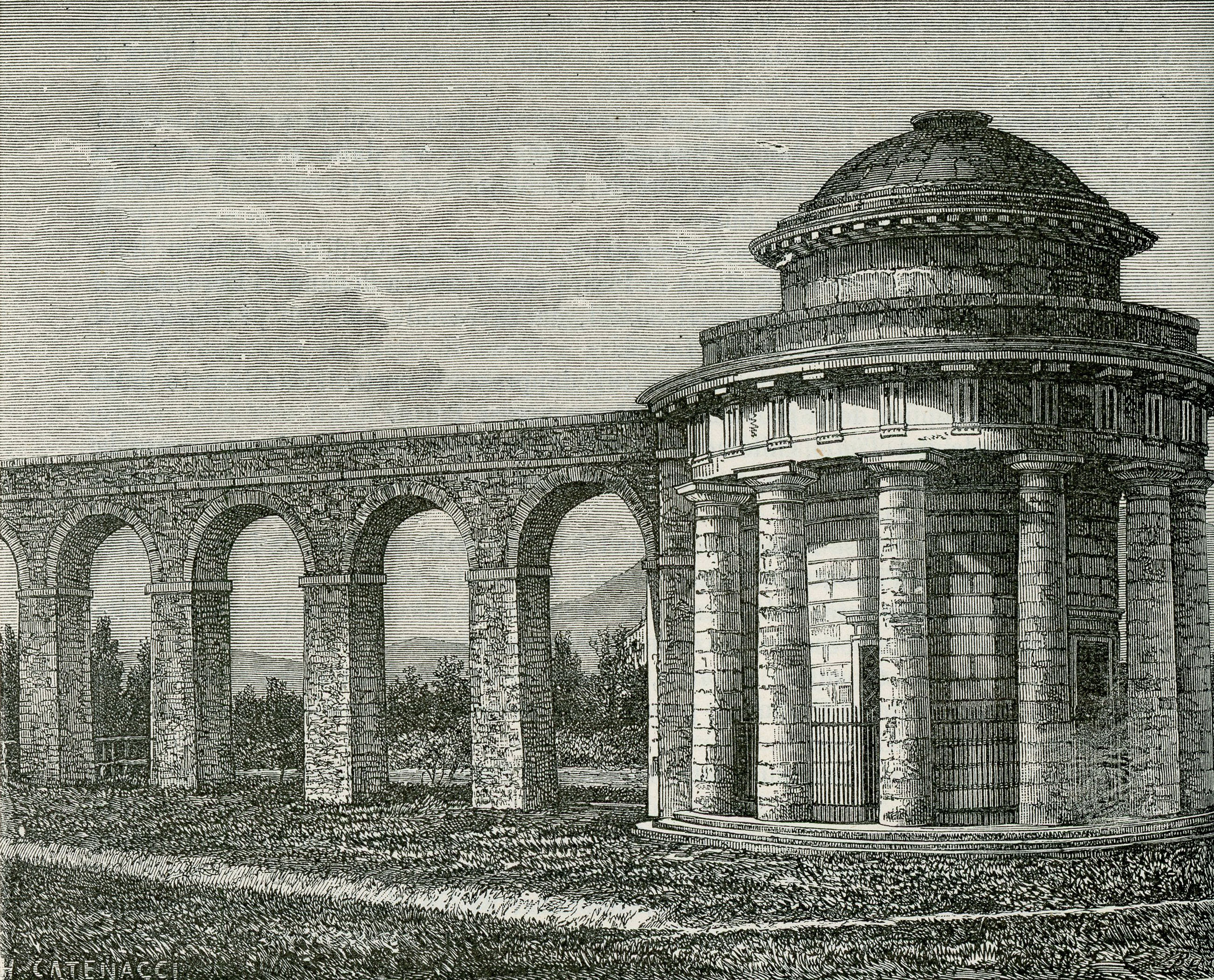
Lorenzo Nottolini, aqueduct, Lucca

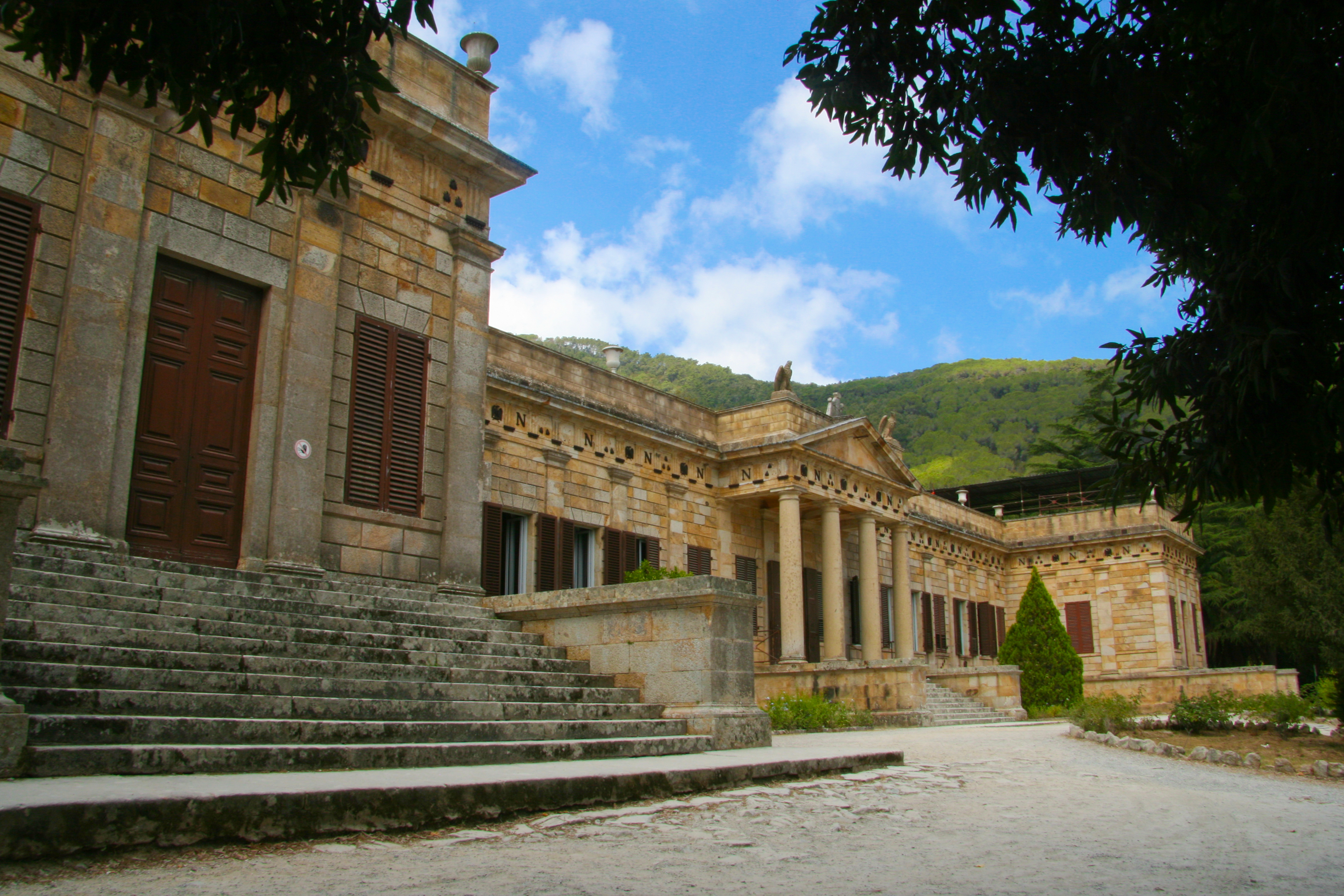
Niccolò Matas, Napoleonic Museum, Portoferraio

== See also ==
- Italian Neoclassical architecture

== Bibliography ==
- Mauro Cozzi, Franco Nuti, Luigi Zangheri (a cura di), Edilizia in Toscana dal Granducato allo stato unitario, Firenze 1992. (1992). Cozzi, Mauro; Nuti, Franco; Zangheri, Luigi (eds.). Edilizia in Toscana dal Granducato allo stato unitario. Firenze.
- Cresti, Carlo, ed. (1992). Agostino Fantastici architetto senese 1782 - 1845. Torino.
- Cresti, Carlo; Zangheri, Luigi (1978). Architetti e ingegneri nella Toscana dell’Ottocento. Firenze.
- Cresti, Carlo (1987). La Toscana dei Lorena. Politica del territorio e architettura. Cinisello Balsamo.
- De Fusco, Renato (1980). L'architettura dell'Ottocento. Torino.
- Kaufmann, Emil (1955). Architecture in the Age of Reason. Baroque and Post Baroque in England, Italy, France. Cambridge.
- Lavagnino, Emilio (1956). L'arte moderna dai neoclassicisti ai contemporanei. Torino.
- Maltese, Corrado (1960). Storia dell'arte italiana 1785-1943. Torino.
- Matteoni, Dario (1992). Pasquale Poccianti e l'acquedotto di Livorno. Bari.
- Gherardesca, Alessandro (2002). Morolli, Gabriele (ed.). Architetto toscano del Romanticismo (Pisa 1777-1852). Pisa.
- Morolli, Gabriele (1981). L'ingegneria romantica di Lorenzo Nottolini (1787-1851). Fantasie tecnologiche e realismo territoriale nella Lucca della Restaurazione. Firenze.
- Middleton, Robin; Watkin, David (2001). Architettura dell'Ottocento. Milano.
- Pevsner, Nikolaus; Fleming, John; Honour, Hugh (2005). Dizionario di architettura. Torino.
- Zangheri, Luigi, ed. (1984). Alla scoperta della Toscana dei Lorena: l'architettura di Giuseppe e Alessandro Manetti e Carlo Reishammer. Firenze.
- Zangheri, Luigi (1987). Firenze e la Toscana nel periodo napoleonico. Progetti e realizzazioni, in Villes et territoire pendant la période napoléonienne (France et Italie). Actes du colloque de Rome (3-5 mai 1984). Roma. pp. 315–325.
