= San Giovanni Evangelista, Ponsacco =

Roman Catholic church in Ponsacco, Italy

Coordinates: 43.61990°N 10.63195°E

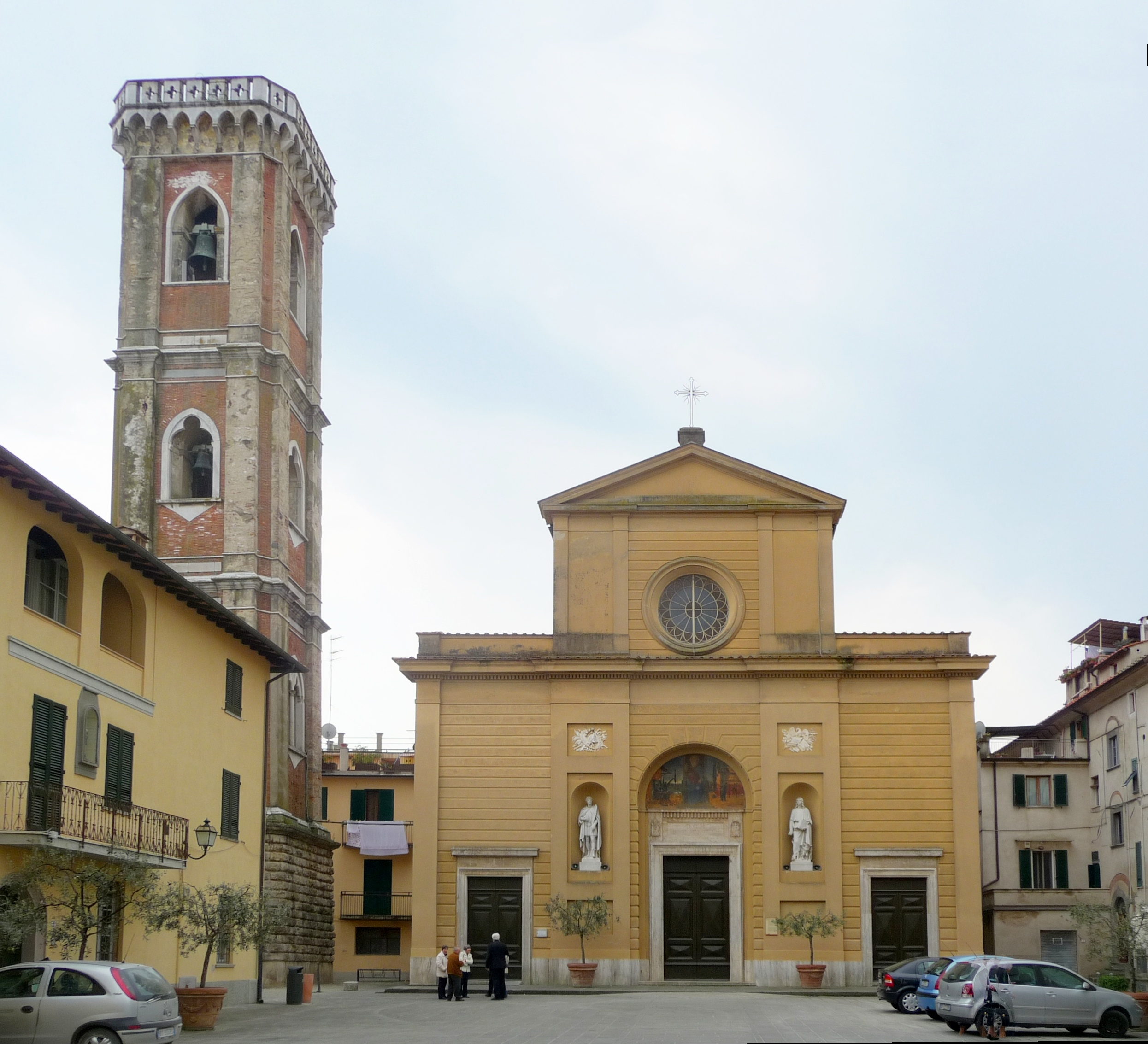
Facade of church with detached bell-tower

San Giovanni Evangelista is a Neoclassical-style, Roman Catholic parish church, located on the piazza of the same name in the center of the town of Ponsacco in the province of Pisa, Tuscany, Italy.

== History ==
This church was designed by Alessandro Gherardesca, was begun in 1823, and consecrated in 1836. The symmetric sober facade has well defined elements: two central pilasters have niches with statues. A central arched door has a taller pediment and is surmounted by a rose window. The three entrance doors define the central nave and two aisles. The detached Neo-gothic architecture bell-tower, built between 1862 and 173, rises some 36 meters, but has a subtle lean. In 2014, the bell tower underwent restoration.

The interior was extensively frescoed in the 19th and 20th centuries. In the dome, are frescoes of the Theological virtues (1829) by Giuseppe Bacchini. In the spandrels, are depictions of the Four Evangelists (1912) by Vincenzo Ceccanti (1871–1916). The flat ceiling of the nave has frescoes depicting the Martyrdom of St John the Evangelist and Vision of the Apocalypse (1848) by Ezio Marzi (1875–1955); another Apocalypse by Gaetano Sarti; and a Crucifixion (1950) and Holy Year 1950 by Luigi Antonio Gaioni (1889–1966). The Chapel of the Madonna della Neve has a statue of the Madonna and Child attributed to Benedetto da Maiano and a modern fresco depicting the Assumption of the Virgin (1959) also by Gaioni. The church putatively has the relics of St Constance Martyr, derived from the Roman Catacombs of Callixtus. The organ was made by Agati family in 1836.
