= Zanobi del Rosso =

Italian architect

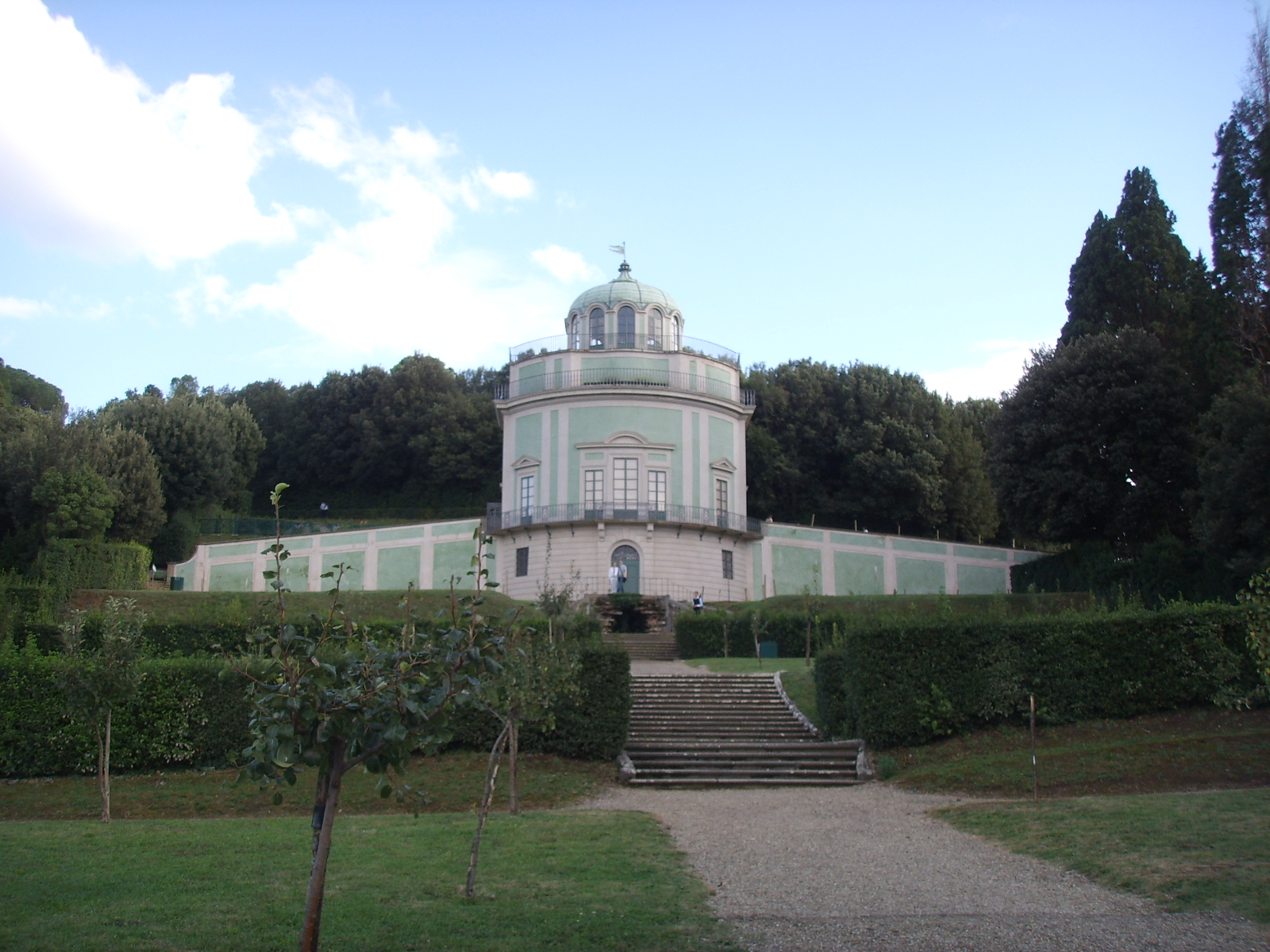
Kaffeehaus in the Boboli Gardens, designed by Zanobi del Rosso.

Zanobi del Rosso (1724–1798) was an Italian architect. He designed the Kaffeehaus in the Boboli Gardens.
