= Museum of Fashion and Costume =

Fashion museum at the Pitti Palace, Florence, Italy

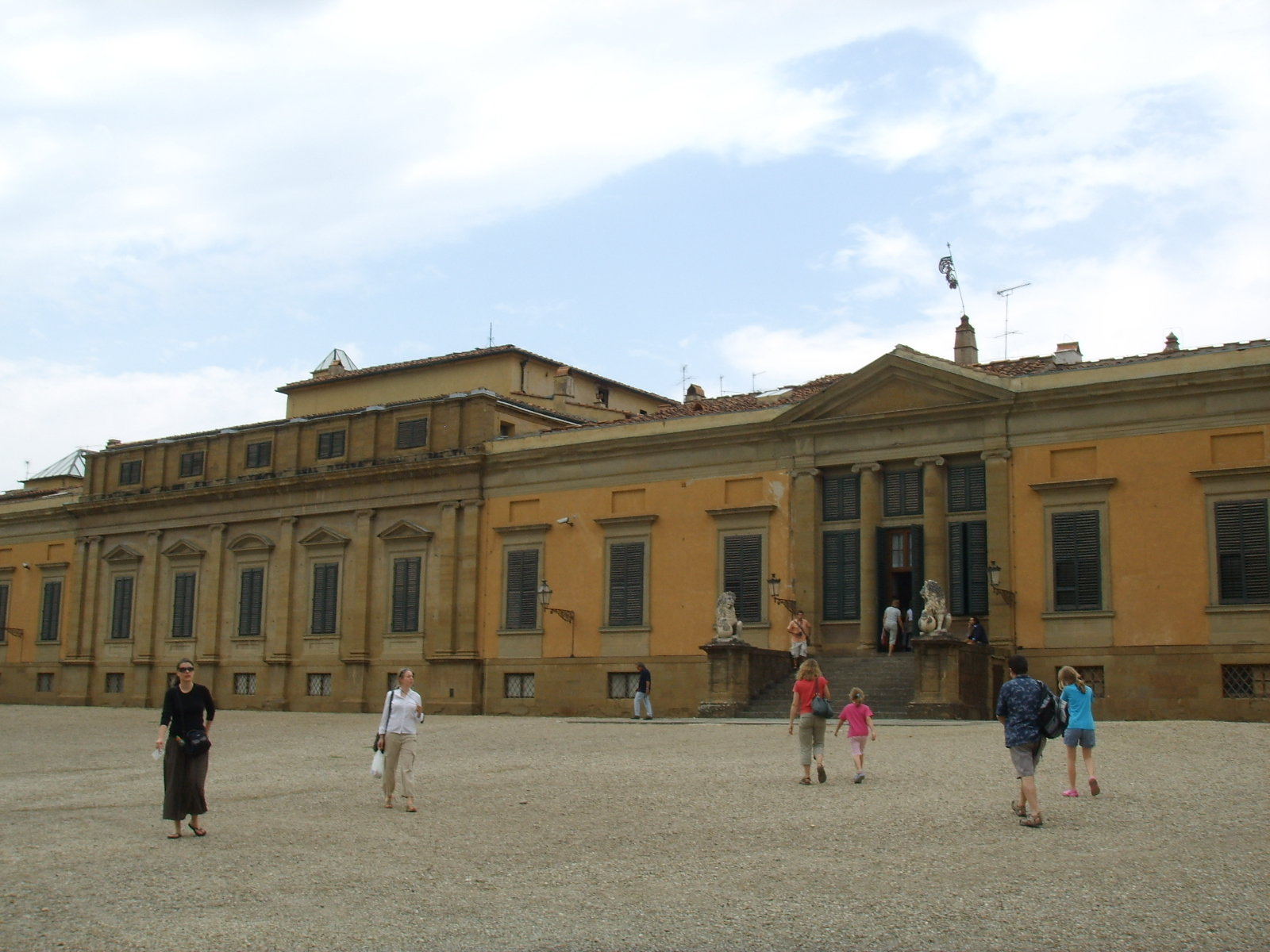
Palazzina della Meridiana

The Museum of Fashion and Costume (the Costume Gallery) is one of the museums housed in the Pitti Palace in Florence.

It is housed at the Palazzina della Meridiana, a pavilion south of the main palace; it is accessible from the Boboli Gardens.

It was founded in 1983. The collections span the period from the 18th century to the present, including more than 6,000 objects.

== Exhibitions ==
- 2017 The Ephemeral Museum of Fashion

== Gallery ==
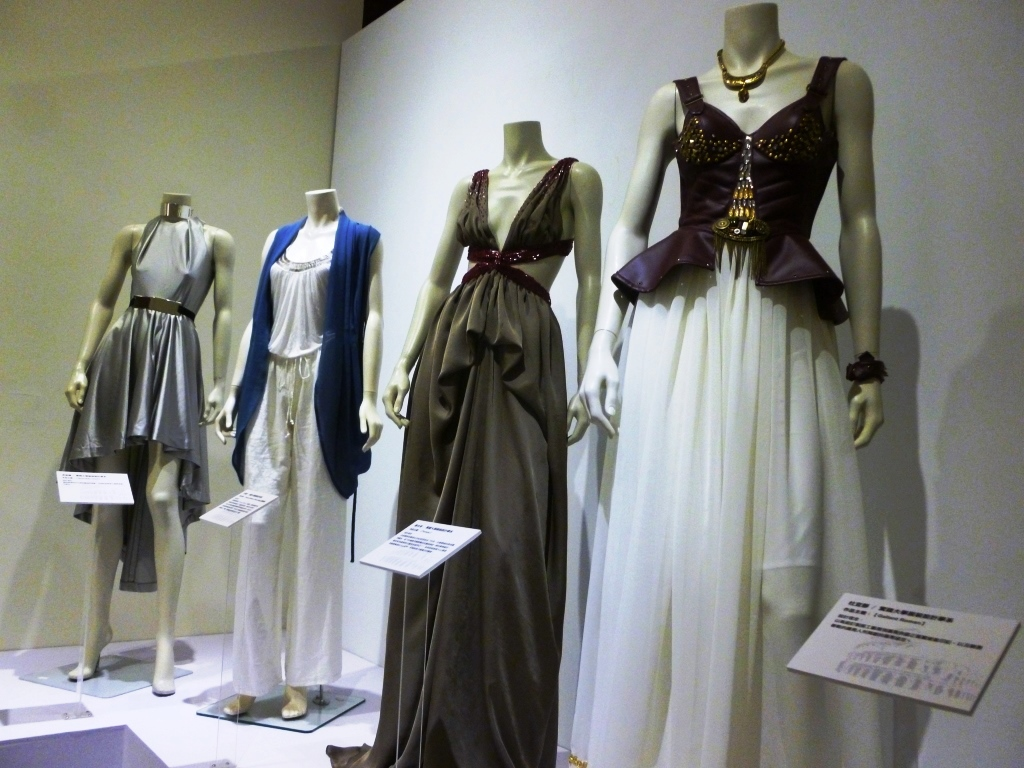
Reconstructed Roman women's fashions

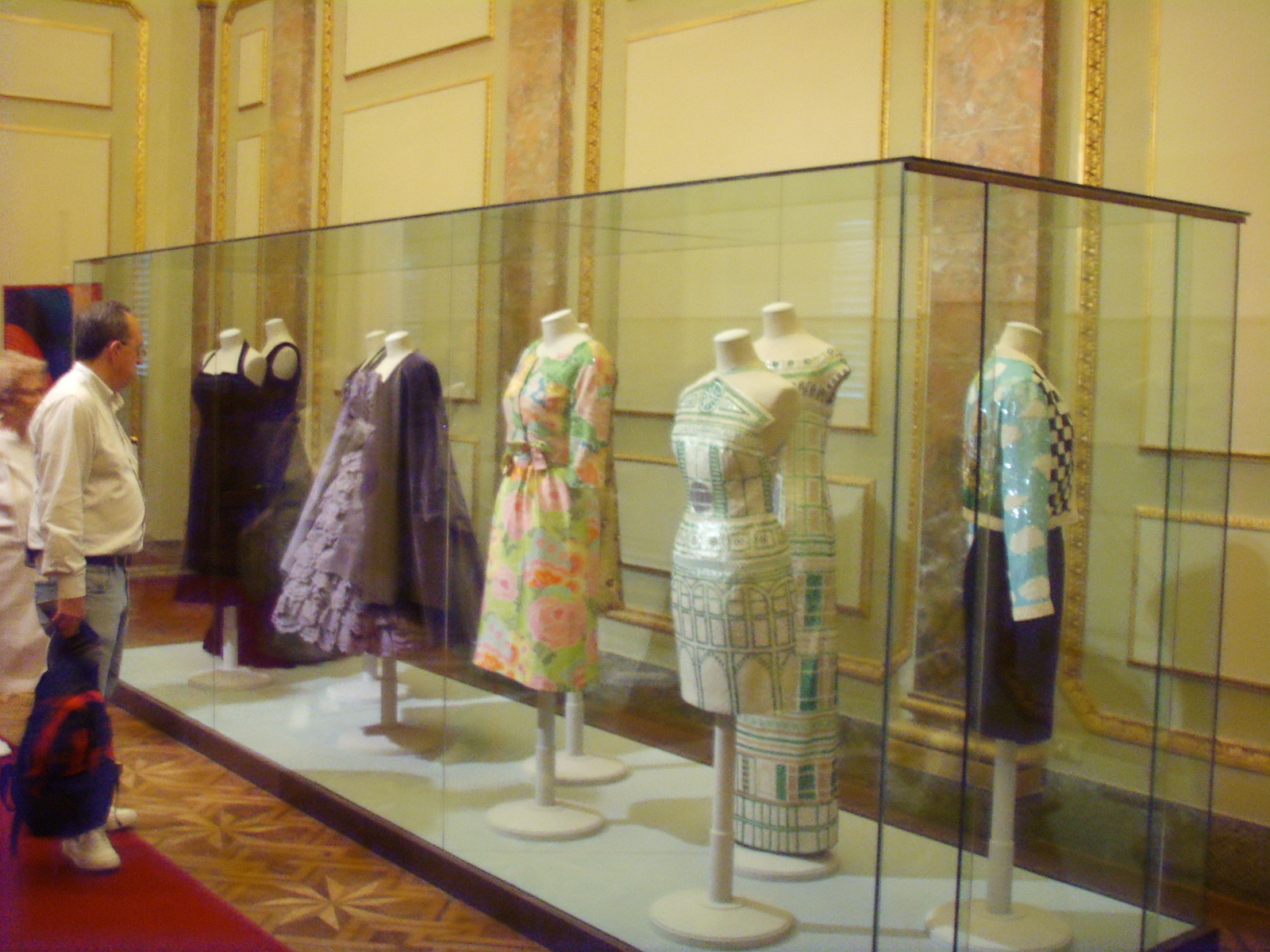

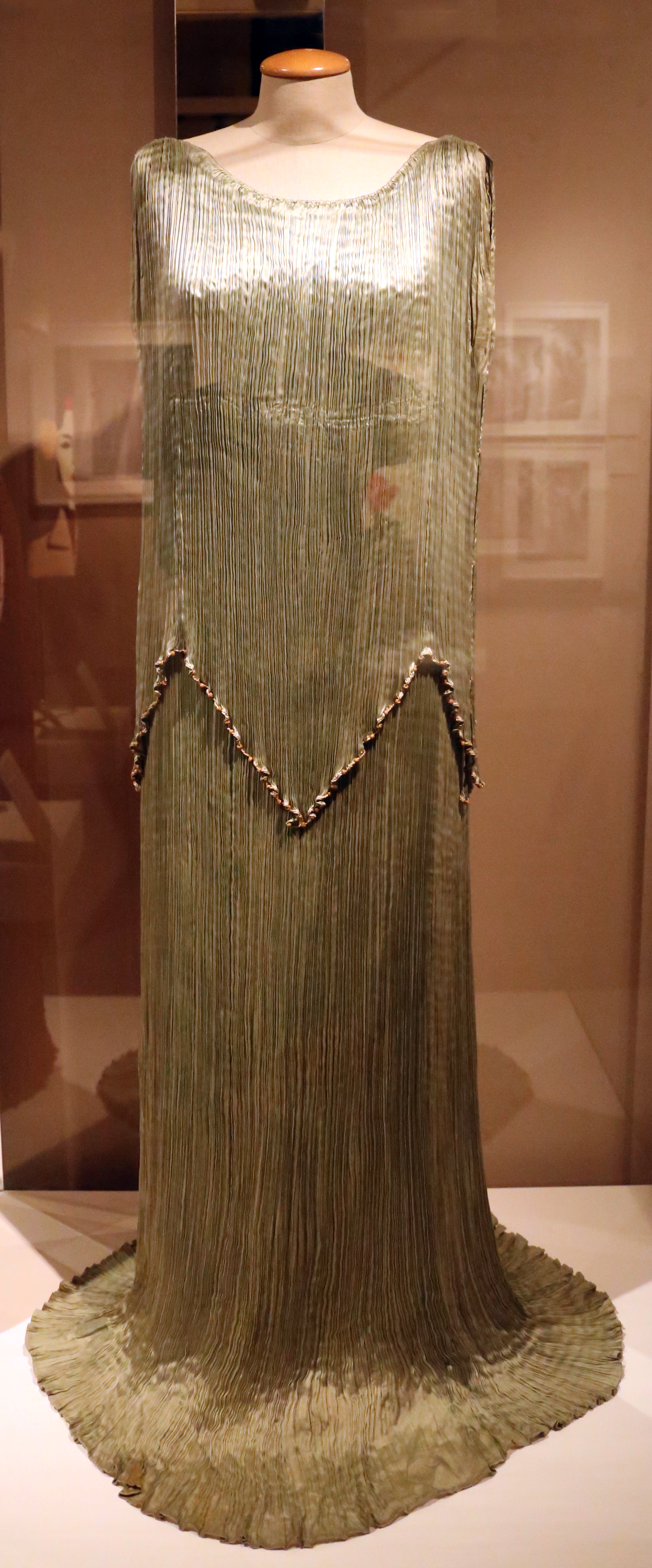
Clothing designed by Fortuny
