= Alessandro Gherardesca =

Italian architect and engineer

Alessandro Gherardesca (1771–18 January 1852) was an Italian architect and engineer, active in his native Pisa and Livorno.

He was born in Pisa to a family of musicians, but elected to work mainly in architectural refurbishments, mostly in styles restoring older buildings, and applying Neo Gothic or Neo-Renaissance styles. He gained appointment as Professor of Architecture and then Director of the Accademia di Belle Arti of Pisa, as well as Professor at the Florentine counterpart. In the Tuscan Government he was appointed Leading Architect of the Deputation of Public Works and Ornament in Livorno.

According to Alessandro Melis and Julia Gatley, his transformation of the Piazza del Duomo, Gherardesca created an idealised image of the original square, one that was in line with British trends.
