= Cisternoni of Livorno =

Monumental building in Tuscany, Italy

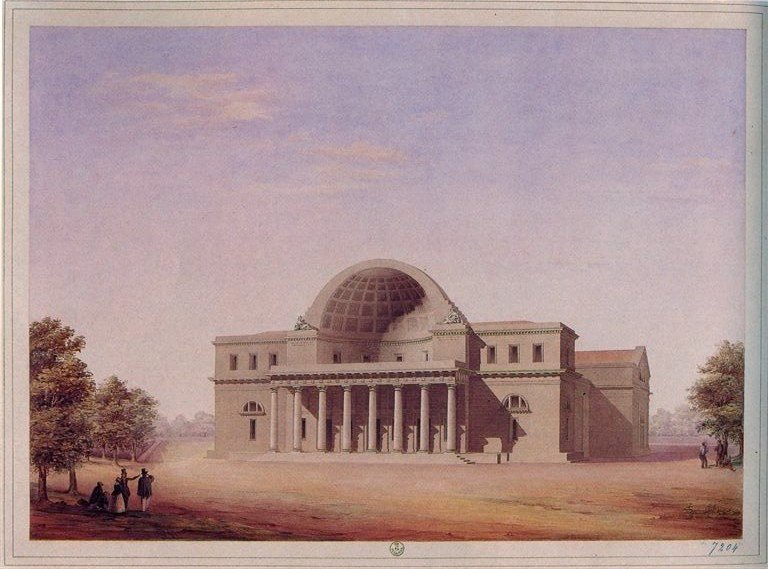
"La Gran Cisterna" at Livorno designed by Pasquale Poccianti.

The Cisternoni of Livorno are a series of three large buildings in the neoclassical style at Livorno, in Tuscany, Italy. They were constructed between 1829 and 1848 as part of a complex of purification plants and storage tanks to the Leopoldino aqueduct; a fourth cisternone planned at Castellaccia was never built. The cisternoni, literally "great cisterns", provided Livorno—a city that is still today one of the principal ports of the Mediterranean—with fresh and, more importantly, clean water throughout the 19th and 20th centuries.

Designed by the architect Pasquale Poccianti, the cisternoni are architecturally important, as they represent the advent of an aesthetically considered approach to the design of utilitarian public work. This movement, whose followers are sometimes known as "Utopians", was pioneered by such architects as Étienne-Louis Boullée and Claude-Nicolas Ledoux at the close of the 18th century. The movement resulted in great palaces and temples of industry and commerce, their palatial and temple-like facades concealing the mundane reality of their true use, which were to dominate many towns and landscapes from the 19th century onwards.

== Pasquale Poccianti ==
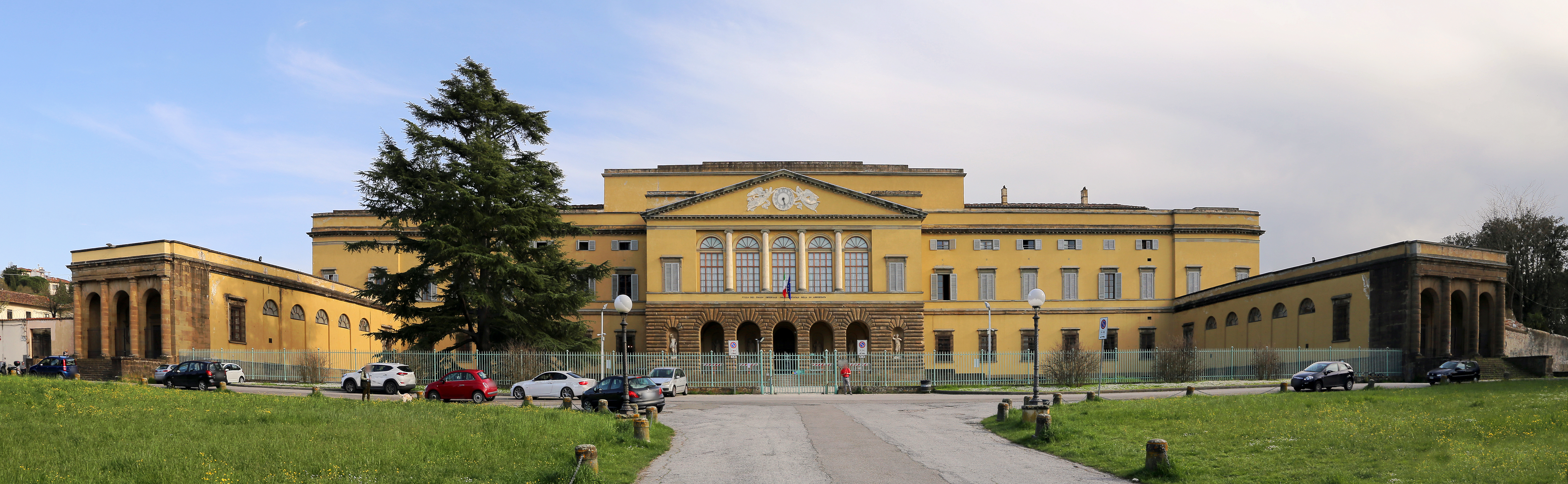
Villa del Poggio Imperiale with the facade envisaged and drawn by Pasquale Poccianti.

Pasquale Poccianti, the reservoirs' architect, was "Engineer to the Commune of Livorno" and "Architect of the Royal Works". Poccianti had trained at Florence's Accademia di Belle Arti. In his capacity as court architect, Poccianti worked on many prominent Tuscan buildings both private and municipal, including the grand ducal residence, the Palazzo Pitti. Poccianti was a keen disciple of the architect Gaspare Maria Paoletti, who had redesigned much of the Villa del Poggio Imperiale leaving only the main facade unchanged. In 1807, Giuseppe Cacialli redesigned the principal facade of the Villa from drawings by Poccianti.

In their use of monumental neoclassical architecture for industrial buildings, the Livorno cisterns can be compared with works of radical French neoclassicists Étienne-Louis Boullée and Claude-Nicolas Ledoux. Thus their dominating, over-scaled proportions emphasize the new prominence which was to be given throughout the 19th century to functional buildings providing mundane services—not only celebrating the innovations of the forthcoming industrial age but attempting to realise the Utopian approach to town planning envisaged from the late 18th century. Previously such buildings, when they existed, had been given little aesthetic architectural consideration and had often been hidden from view or, when unavoidably visible, disguised to conceal their true use. Occasionally the disguise could draw more attention than necessary, as was the case with the pumping station designed by Ludwig Persius built in Sanssouci Park in 1842, which was disguised as a grandiose mosque complete with minarets.

== La Gran Conserva ==
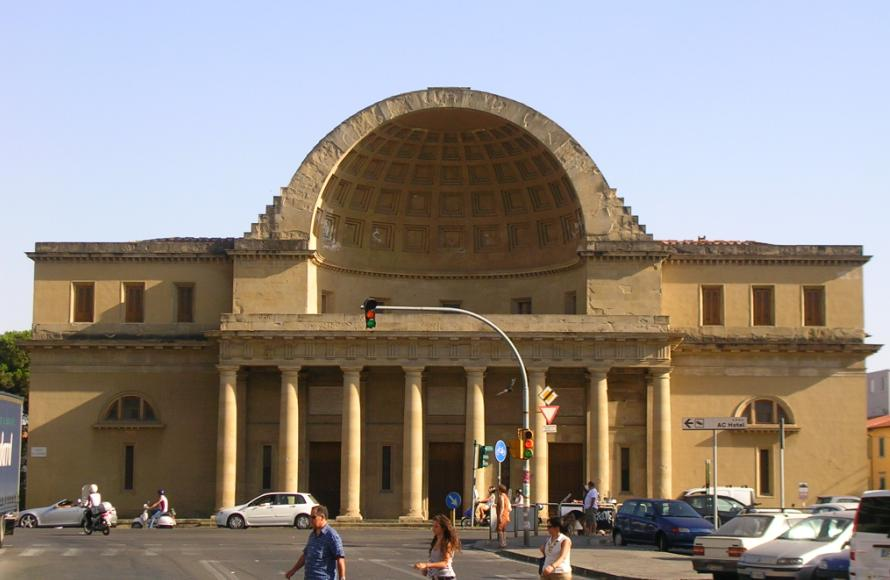
"La Gran Conserva" of Livorno designed in 1829

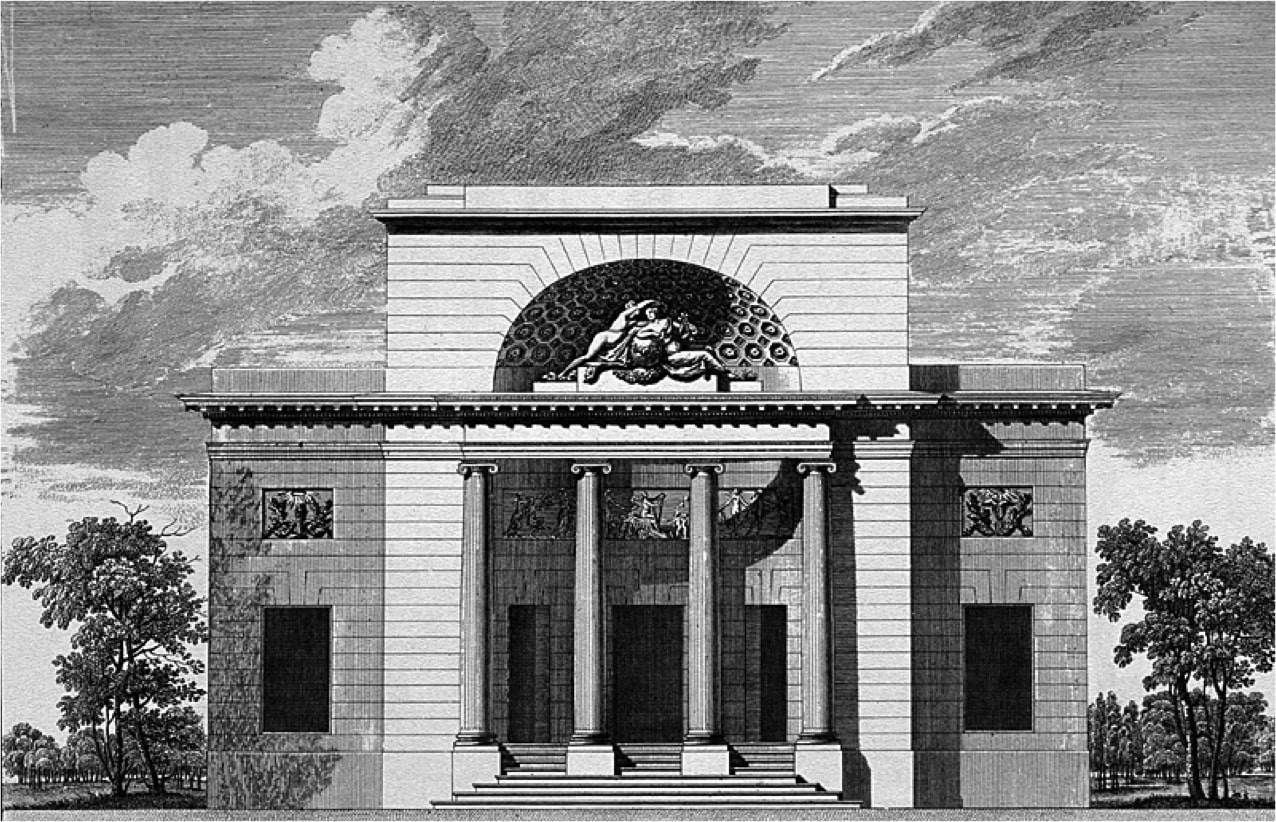
The 1766 design by Ledoux for Marie-Madeleine Guimard's Parisian mansion with a similar niche to that of the Gran Cisternone.

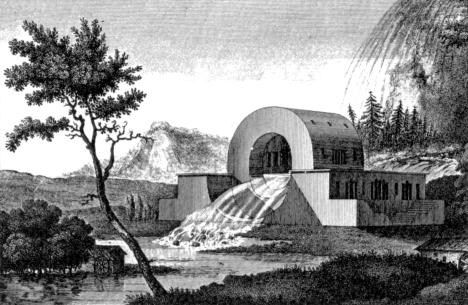
One of Ledoux's plans for the ideal city of Chaux: The "House of Supervisors" at the source of the Loue. Published in 1804. The River Inspector's house straddles the river.

La Gran Conserva, or "Il Cisternone" (43.5525°N 10.3195°E), situated on what were the outskirts of 19th-century Livorno, is the largest and best known of the city's's covered cisterns. It was constructed between 1829 and 1842 to the design of Pasquale Poccianti. While the facade of the Cisternone was completed by 1833 to commemorate the marriage of Tuscany's ruling Grand Duke Leopoldo II to his second wife Maria Antonietta, the water system was not fully operational until 1842.

It is thought that the architect, Antonio Antolini (better known for his work at the Bonaparte Forum in Milan, a circular piazza of palazzi with the Castello Sforzesco at its centre) may have also been involved in the design, as correspondence between him and Poccianti regarding the Cisternone exists.

The building appears almost surreal in its design, due to its dominant dome which resembles more a "cut-away" illustrative architectural drawing, a section, than a realised project. Inspired by the Pantheon in Rome the "dome" is unique, appearing as a half-dome or "semi-cupola." It is in reality an enormous niche—open to the elements—thus it seems that one views the interior from the exterior. A similar, but less theatrical, construction can be seen crowning the classical temple front of Alberti's Basilica of Sant'Andrea in Mantua, built in 1470.

At Livorno, the great niche surmounts a massive portico supported by eight columns in the Tuscan order, the order theorists considered most appropriate to military architecture. Attention is drawn to the niche by its proportions which dwarf the lower floors beneath it. One explanation for the individuality of the great niche is that large niches and concave recesses ornamenting pediments were a defining feature of Italian Baroque architecture. In Italy the Baroque style was superseded more swiftly by the neoclassical style than elsewhere in Europe; thus there can be found a confusing blend of the two styles in parts of Italy. However, the Gran Cisterno is very late for this fusion of styles, so the influence of Ledoux seems the most likely reason for this magnificently eccentric feature. There are obvious similarities between the Gran Conserva and Ledoux's drawings for the "House of Supervisors" at his idealistic vision of the city of Chaux, a late 18th-century example of modern town planning and more obviously still in a design by Ledoux for a Parisian mansion for Marie-Madeleine Guimard, which was conceived as early as 1766. In its turn, the Gran Cisternone was to be the inspiration for the design of half-dome Beaux-Arts bandshells, such as the Naumburg Bandshell in Central Park, New York.

The interior of the building is divided into two halves. The first and most visible is the principal facade and its flanking wings, which house the apartments for caretakers and staff; behind lies the second half and main body of the building which contains the T-shaped reservoir itself. This is subdivided by Tuscan columns supporting the roof above, giving it the air of a cavernous aquatic cathedral.

The cisterns were not only places for storing the city's water but were also "purgatori"—places for purifying the water. Water entered the reservoir from the Acquedotto Leopoldino through layers of gravel and carbon, a method of filtration which was later replaced by a more modern chlorine treatment system. The later removal of the gravel filtering system meant that the cistern could be used to its maximum capacity to store 10,000 cubic metres of water. This reservoir and purification plant is still in use today.

== Cisternino di Pian di Rota ==
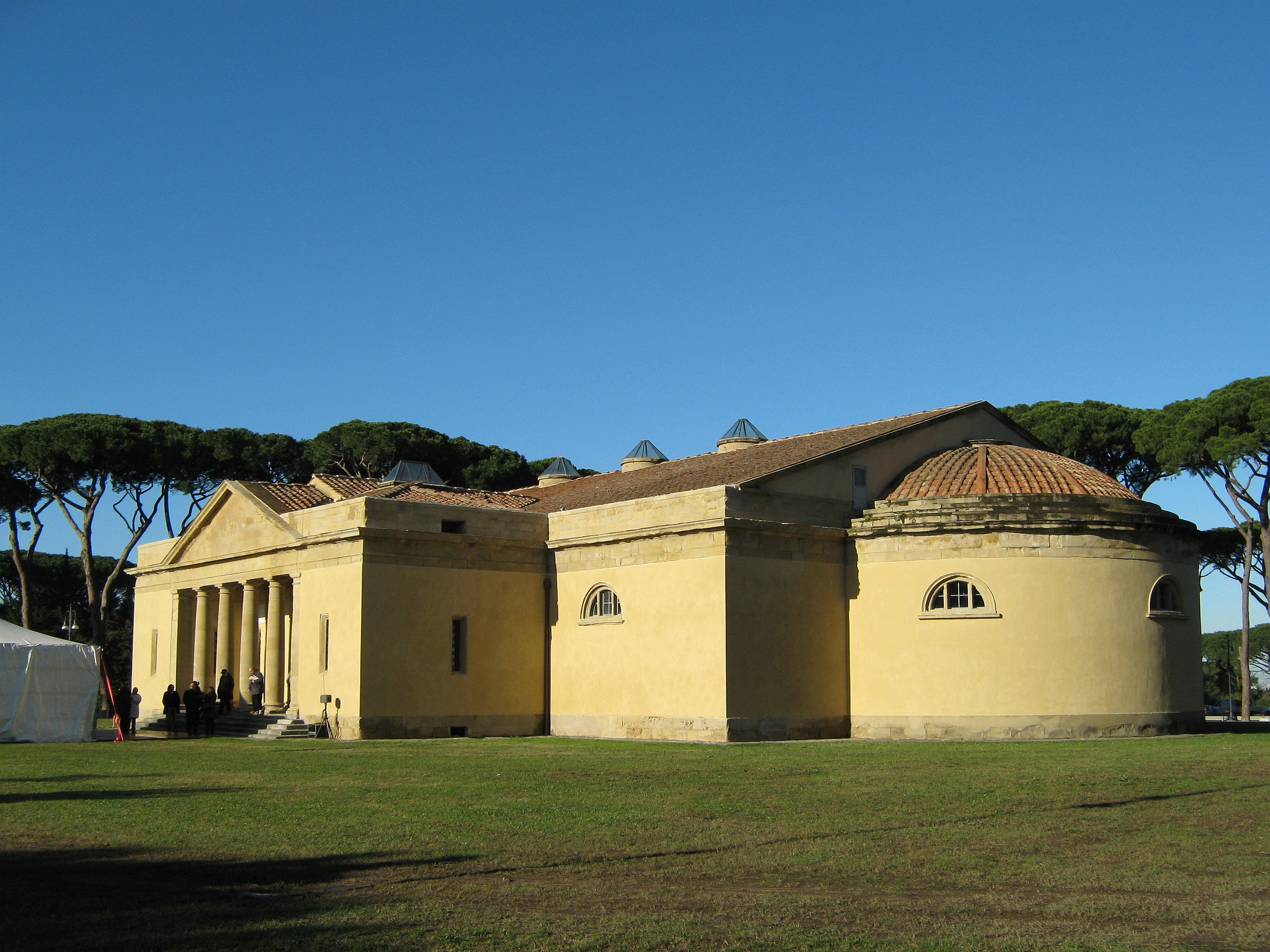
Cisternino di Pian di Rota designed in 1827

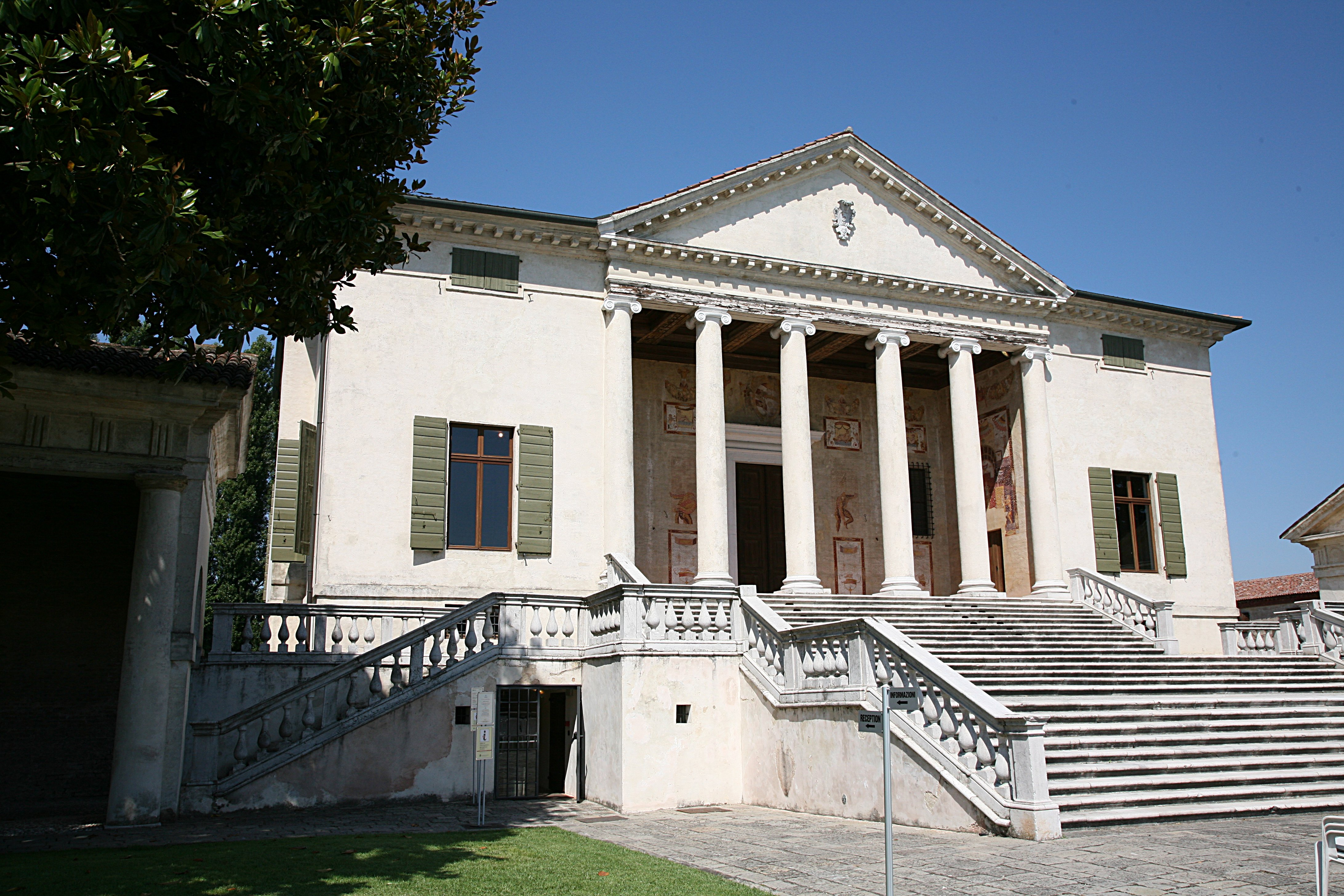
Villa Badoer designed by Palladio in 1557

The smaller Cisternino di Pian di Rota (43.5686°N 10.3645°E), in the Pian di Rota area of the city, was begun in 1845, although it had been planned as early as 1827. While, like the architect's other works, it is strictly speaking in the neoclassical style, the Cisternino di Pian di Rota also has the air of a Palladian villa of the Veneto. The symmetrical facade is dominated by a massive prostyle portico clearly based on that of the Pantheon in Rome while the composition of the facade could be emulating Scamozzi's Villa Rocca Pisana or Palladio's Villa Badoer. Whatever the inspiration, the architect's vision of achieving Utopian ideals in architecture by emulating the temples of antiquity is very evident. Such philosophies had been advocated and popularised in the paintings of the idealised Italian landscape by Claude, Poussin and Dughet. A temple similar to the Cisternino di Pian di Rota had been built in the 1750s as a garden folly in the gardens at Stourhead in England.

The interior houses the large rectangular reservoir, originally divided into two, as with the other cisternoni. One half houses a filtration system of beds of gravel and carbon. The roof of the reservoir is supported by 28 Tuscan columns.

== Cisternino di Città ==
Cisternino di Città (43.5523°N 10.3130°E) is an austere neoclassical design which was approved in 1837 and completed in 1848. The design was greatly altered during its construction: originally the close proximity of neighbouring buildings meant that only one facade would be visible, but alteration and demolitions in the city during 1840 caused the building to face two different new thoroughfares. The result of the redesign was a great loggia supported by ionic columns raised above a heavy base pierced only by sparse and narrow windows. The sides of the building are embellished by apses with lunette windows.

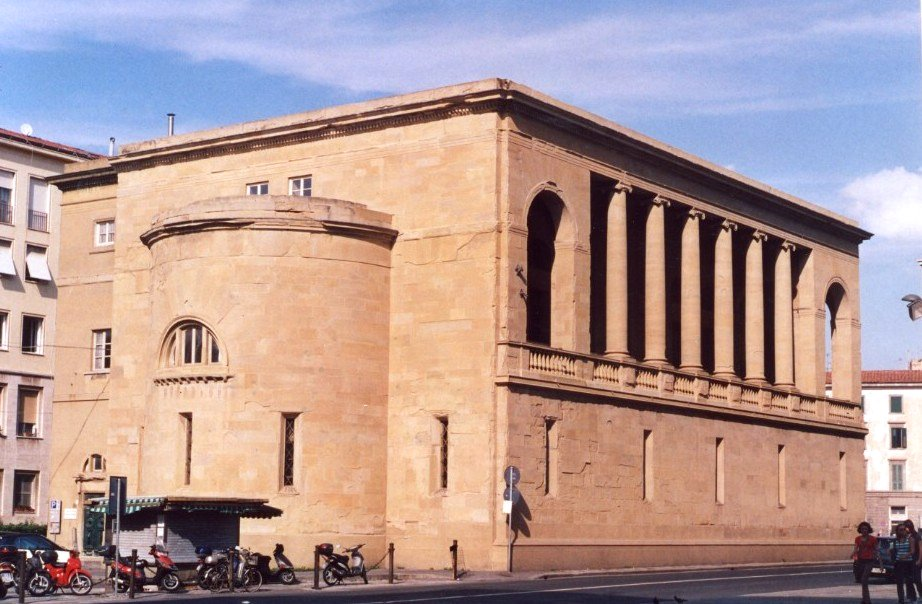
The "Cisternino di città" in the centre of Livorno was also designed by Pasquale Poccianti.

This severe almost startling form of neoclassicism had become popular in the first decade of the 19th century. It was pioneered by such architects as Peter Speeth and Friederich Gilly and is in contrast to the more elegant neoclassicism of such architects as Robert Adam and John Nash. This form of street architecture was most popular in Germany, where it was used to great effect in such squares as Munich's Theresienwiese.

This building was never used for its intended purpose and has been used in several different roles. Most recently it has since 1945 served as Livorno's cultural centre.

== Cisternoni ==
Cisternoni are not peculiar to Livorno; they have been constructed from Roman times in many other locations in Italy. Most notably in Albano Laziale in the 3rd century AD, and Spasiano in Sorrento. Both of these examples, like the comparatively new Gran Conserva, are today still in use. Like their earlier counterparts the Cisternoni of Livorno are today places of public interest.

== Sources ==
- F. Borsi, G. Morolli, L. Zangheri, Firenze e Livorno e l’opera di Pasquale Poccianti, Roma 1974.
- Comune di Livorno, Le opere pubbliche. Grandi opere e Piani di Recupero Urbano, Livorno 2003.
- F. Furbetta, L'approvvigionamento idrico della città di Livorno, Pisa 1960.
- D. Matteoni, Pasquale Poccianti e l'acquedotto di Livorno, Roma - Bari 1992.
- Pasquale Poccianti architetto, 1774 - 1858. Contributi al convegno per la celebrazione del secondo centenario della nascita, a cura di F. Gurrieri e L. Zangheri, Firenze 1977.
- G. Piombanti, Guida storica ed artistica della città e dei dintorni di Livorno, Livorno 1903.
