= Pasquale Poccianti =

Italian architect and engineer

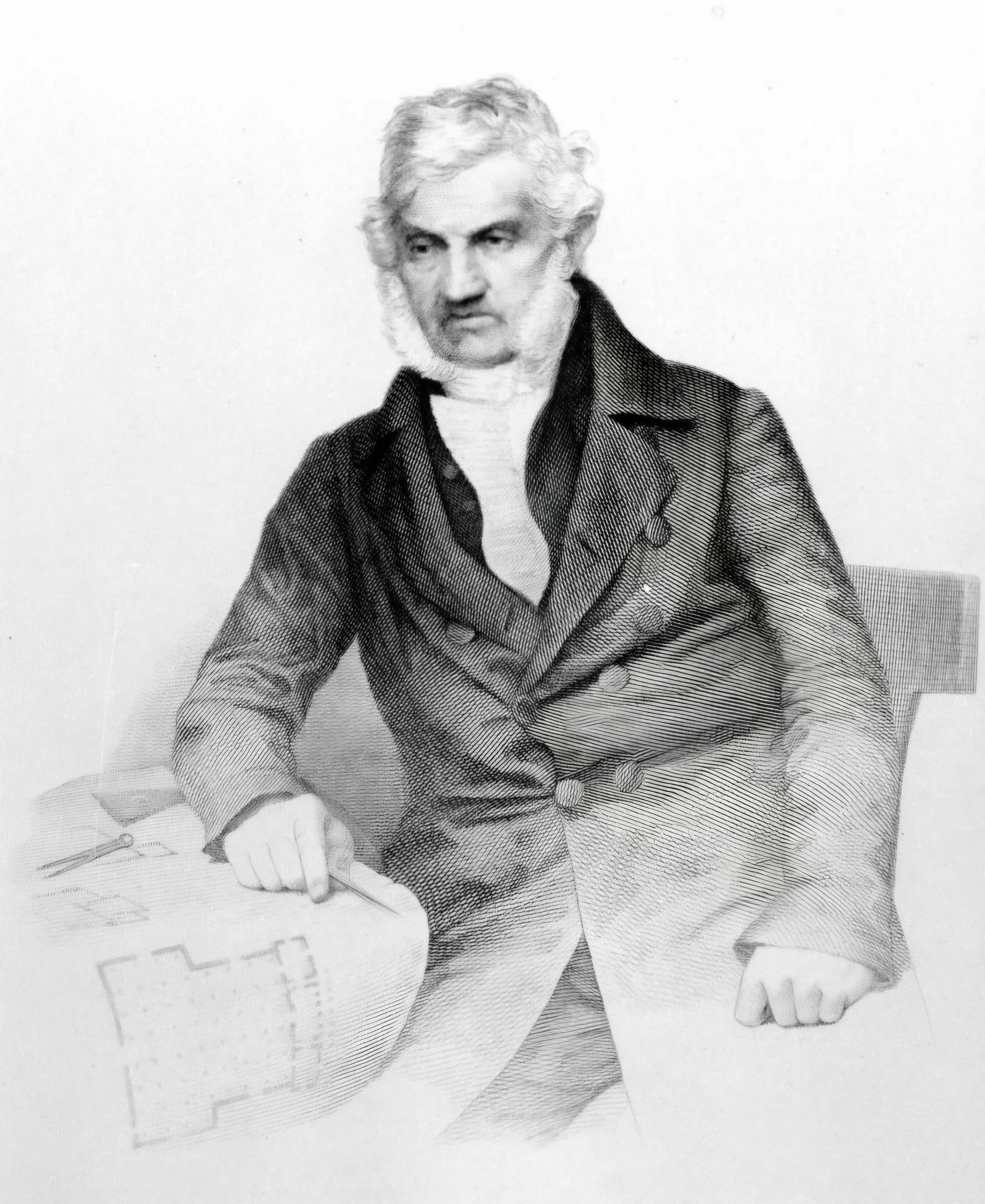
- Engraved portrait of Pasquale Poccianti by Filippo Livi
- Born: 16 May 1774; Bibbiena, Grand Duchy of Tuscany
- Died: 21 October 1858 (aged 84); Florence, Grand Duchy of Tuscany
- Education: Accademia di Belle Arti di Firenze
- Occupations: Architect; Engineer
- Movement: Neoclassicism
- Spouse: Maria Anna Ducci (m. 1817)
- Buildings: Cisternoni of Livorno; Aqueduct of Colognole; Villa del Poggio Imperiale

Signature
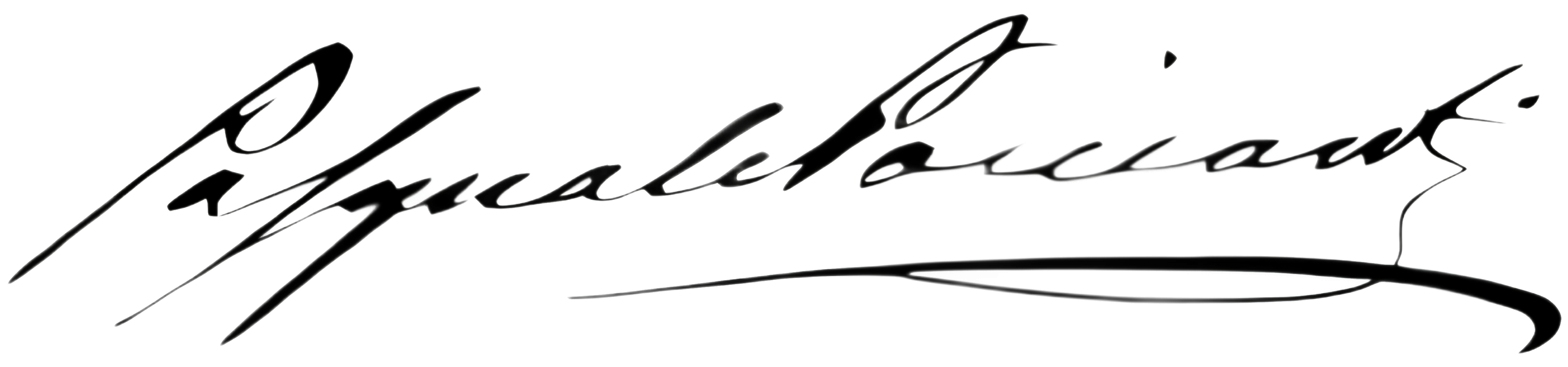

Pasquale Poccianti (May 16, 1774 – October 21, 1858) was a leading Italian Neoclassical architect and engineer. His most important work are the Cisternoni of Livorno, one of the most successful realizations of the Neoclassical style of Boullée, Ledoux, and their contemporaries.

== Biography ==
=== Early life and education ===
Pasquale Poccianti was born in Bibbiena, near Arezzo, on May 16, 1774. In 1784, upon the death of his father, he was sent to Florence, where he studied Mathematics at the Piarist school, under Stanislao Canovai. Between 1791 and 1794 he studied at the school of architecture of the Accademia di Belle Arti di Firenze, under Gaspare Maria Paoletti, winning first prize in the prestigious Concorso Triennale in architecture in 1793 with a design for ‘an establishment for public bathing’. In 1794 he entered the Office of Works for the Grand Duchy of Tuscany as an apprentice, and in 1802 he became an associate engineer.

In 1806 he was sent to Livorno, where he became Community Engineer in 1809 and subsequently Chief Engineer of the Servizio Ponti e Strade del Dipartimento del Mediterraneo. In 1812 Poccianti was called to Elisa Baciocchi's court, but his contribution was limited to a few projects of monumental urban structures in the neoclassical style, which, moreover, did not find implementation.

After the restoration of the House of Lorraine in Tuscany, Poccianti was appointed First Architect to the Royal Works from 1817 to 1835; later he became a consultant architect.

=== Early career ===
His first important works after the restoration concerned alterations to grand-ducal residences. At the Palazzo Pitti in Florence he was responsible for the reorganization of the piazza (1818–40), the construction of the new vestibule (1823–36) and of the new grand staircase to the northern apartments (1820–47), the refurbishment of the second-floor quarters (1819–40), the corridor (1820–31) linking the palazzo with the Museo di Fisica della Specola and the completion of the Meridiana wing started by Paoletti in 1776; the last included the south façade, ballroom, chapel and interior décor (1819–41).

Poccianti also prepared designs for the Villa del Poggio Imperiale and executed numerous works on the grand-ducal villas at Poggio a Caiano (the new orangery and adjacent reservoir, 1824–32; the new stables, 1826; the reordering of the chapel, 1834–6), at Pratolino and at L'Ambrogiana (new stables and river wall, 1822–32).

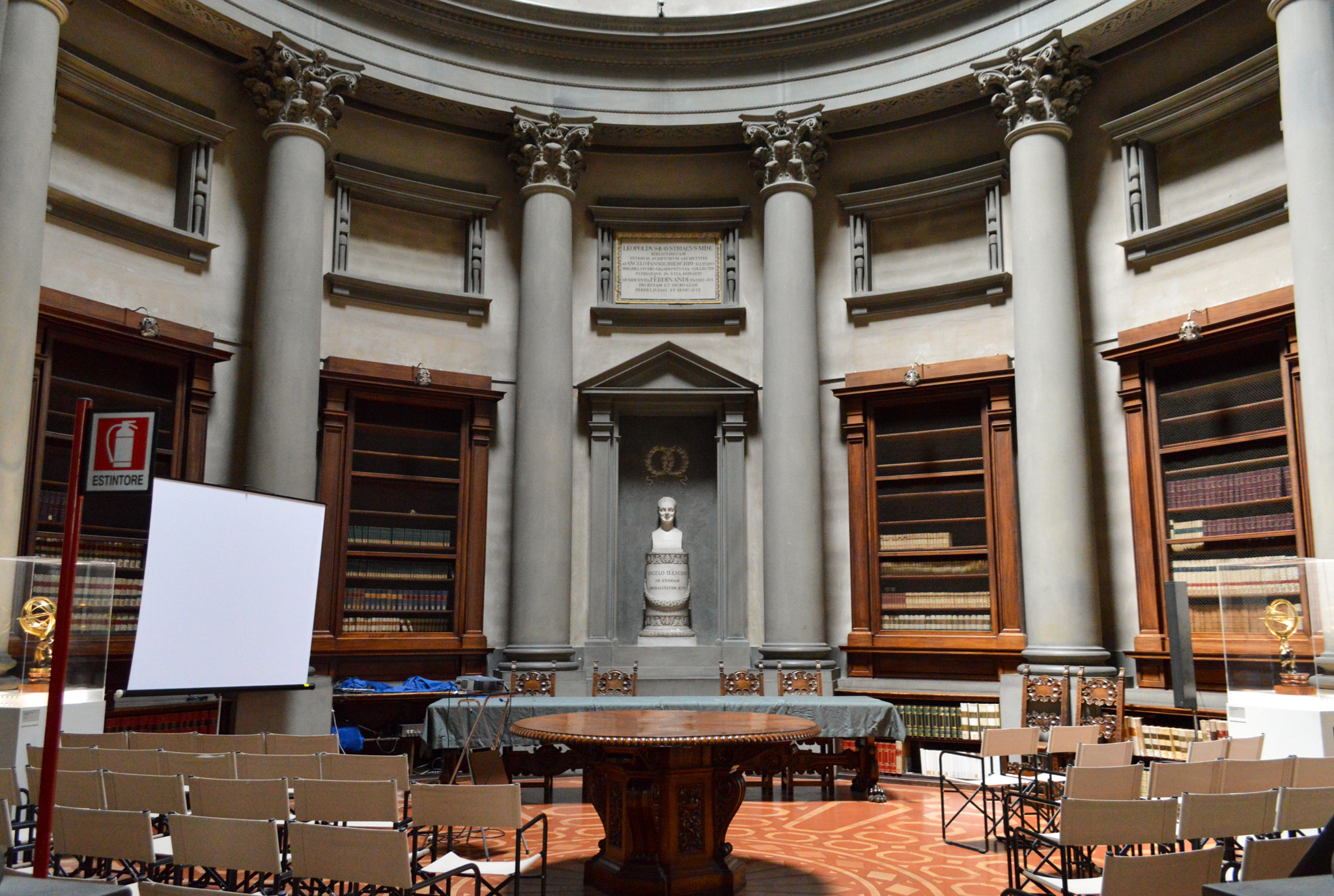
The rotunda of the Laurentian Library

Poccianti was also responsible for many other important works in Florence, including the restoration and conversion of the Palazzo Strozzi for use as grand-ducal offices; the construction of the new school of anatomy (1818–26) at the Hospital of Santa Maria Nuova, in the former convent of Santa Maria degli Angeli, and the supervision of the extension (1817–41) of the Laurentian Library, including the creation of the elegant Sala d’Elci, designed to house the collection of ancient books donated by the scholar Angelo Maria d'Elci to the Library. From 1836 he also drew up a grandiose project for the basilica of the Laurenziana complex, consisting of a design for a new façade, a proposed funeral chapel for the family of the House of Lorraine and the direct connection between the basilica and the Medici Chapel.

Between 1835 and 1848 he worked on the restoration of the Loggia dell’Orcagna and the proposals for a new hall for the Galleria delle Statue at the Uffizi and, almost contemporaneously, the refurbishment of the Florentine aqueduct. From 1826 to 1851 he refurbished his own palazzo in Via Ricasoli.

=== In Livorno ===
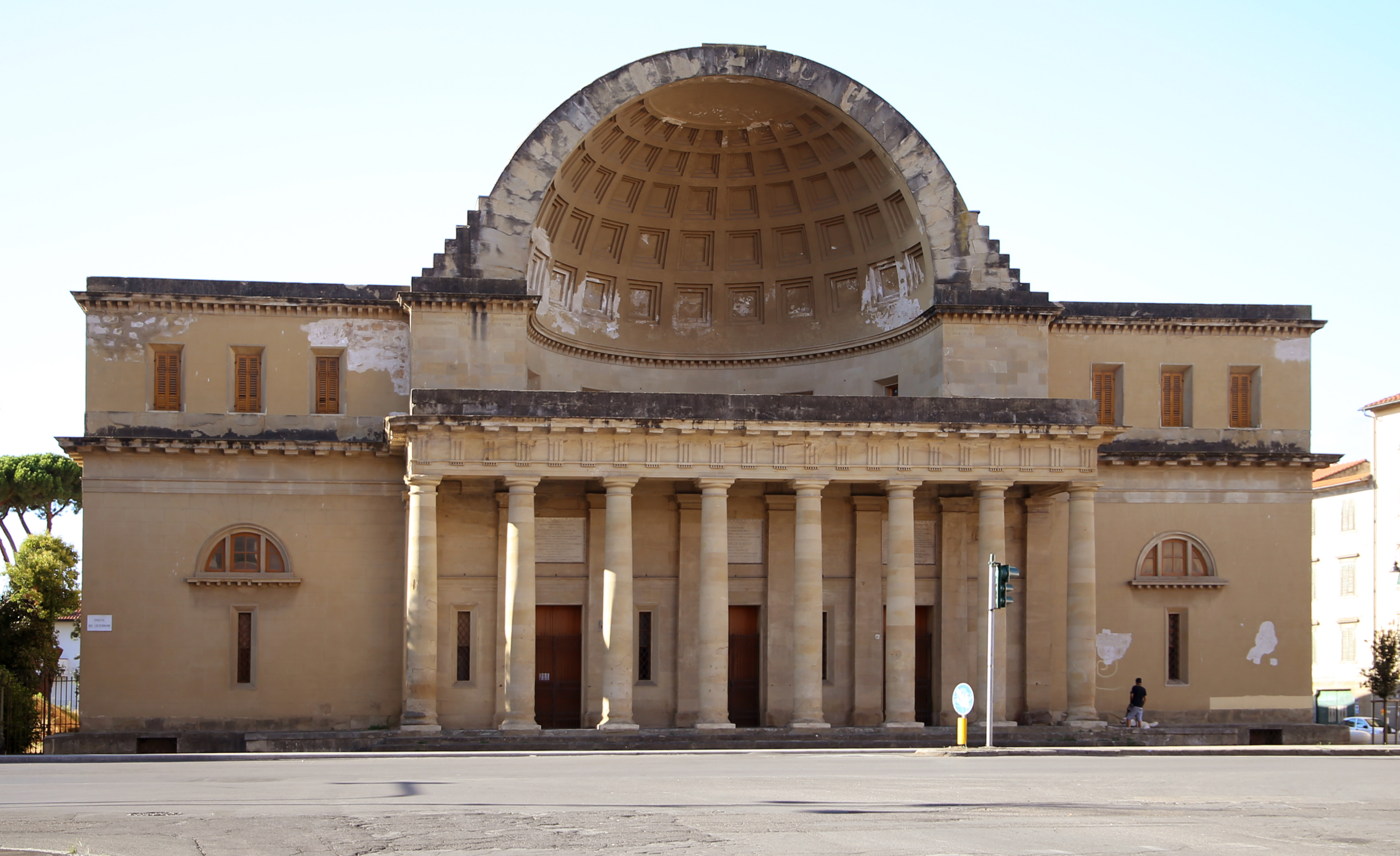
The Cisternone of Livorno

Poccianti also worked in a number of other towns in Tuscany, including Lucca, Pisa, Fiesole and Livorno, where he continued to be involved in various projects throughout his career. His first major project here was the Ponte San Marco (1814–16), after which he was involved in numerous projects connected with the construction of the town’s new aqueduct, including the sewage treatment plant, the passeggiata degli acquedotti (‘promenade of the aqueducts’), the city water distribution reservoir known as ‘Il Cisternino’, the baths of la Puzzolente and the large water distribution reservoir outside the city known as ‘Il Cisternone’ (1829–42), which, with the large piazza at its gates, became the connection in the urban plan linking the city with the passeggiata degli acquedotti. This was one of Poccianti’s most representative works: the function and style fuse to form a design that recalls the great visionary and utopian architecture of Claude-Nicolas Ledoux, Étienne-Louis Boullée and Giovanni Antonio Antolini. The grand passeggiata degli acquedotti equally constitutes an enormously valuable example of urban planning in its blending of the principles of function and ideal harmony.

These principles are also superbly expressed in a grand plan for the expansion of the city of Livorno, presented by Poccianti as an alternative to the one executed by Alessandro Manetti. A splendid ‘topographical map’ of Poccianti’s plan is preserved in the Accademia del Disegno in Florence. In 1849 Poccianti became a member of the Consiglio d’Arte della Direzione dei Lavori d’Acque e Strade and of the Fabbricche Civili. His long career in the grand-ducal civil service, his constant attention to both structural and decorative detail and his influential Neoclassical designs made him a prominent figure in the Tuscan school of architecture. Among his important pupils were Giuseppe Poggi and Mariano Falcini.

== Gallery ==
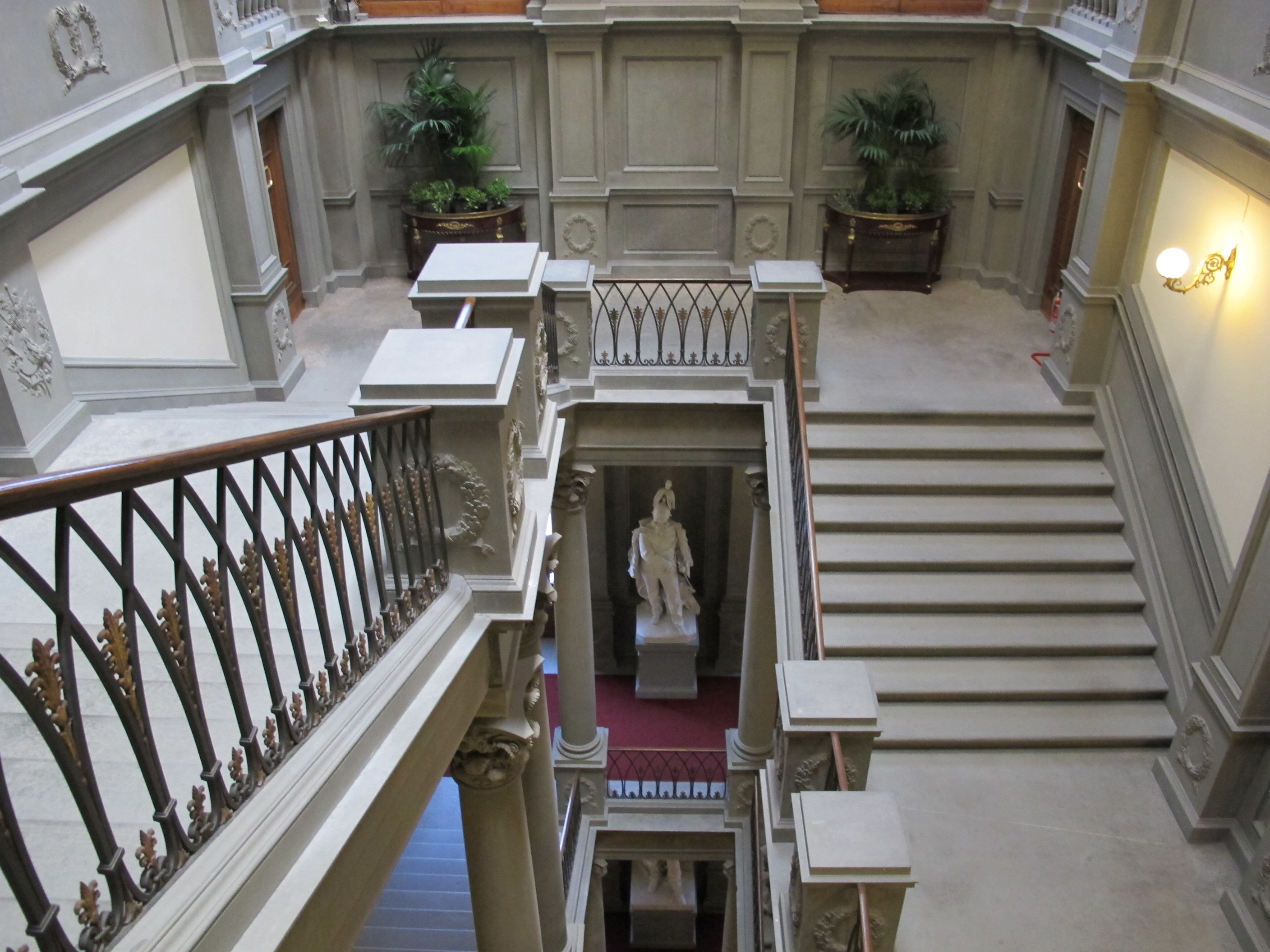
Grand staircase of Palazzo Pitti, 1820–47

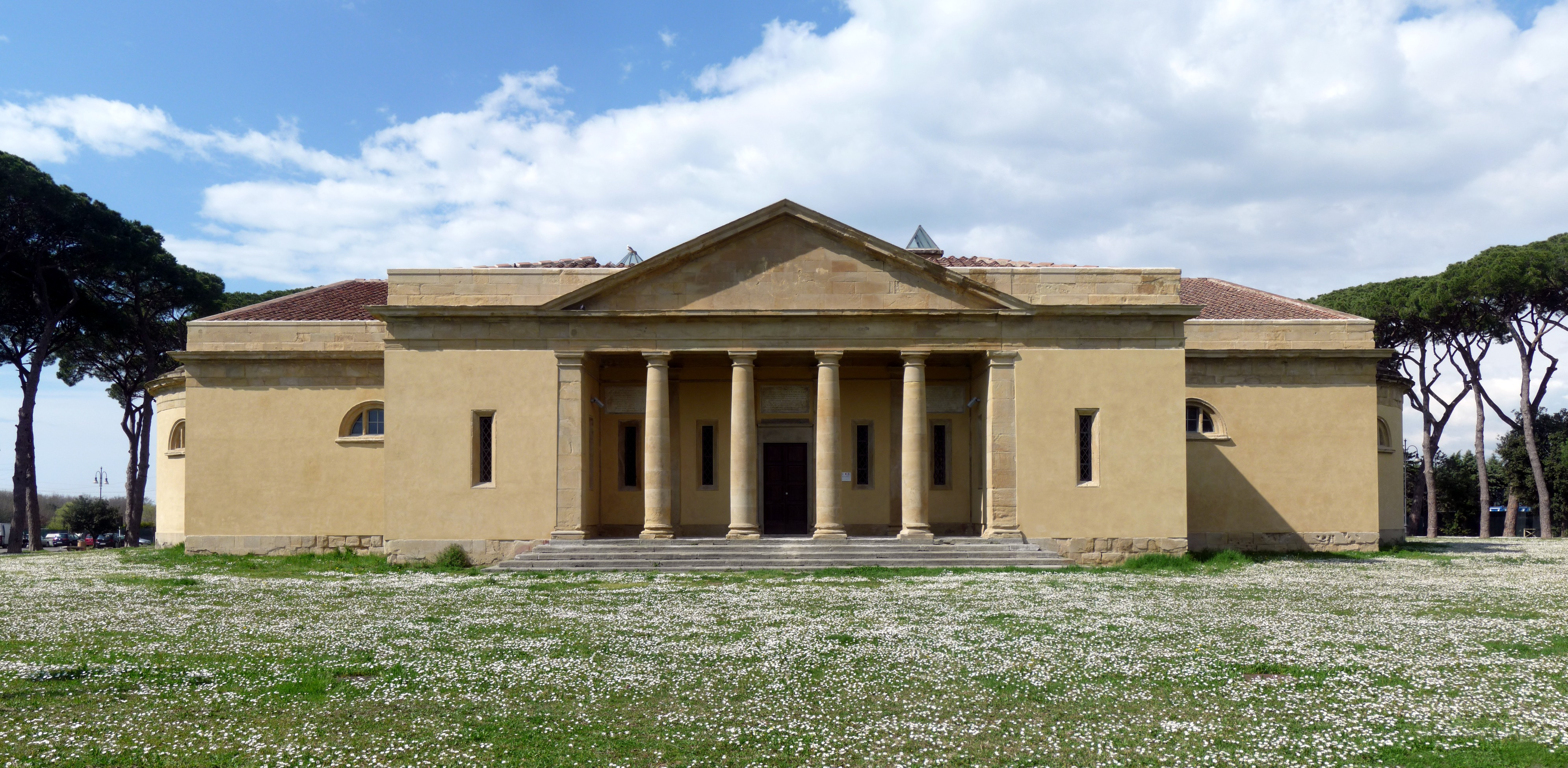
Cisternino Pian di Rota, Livorno

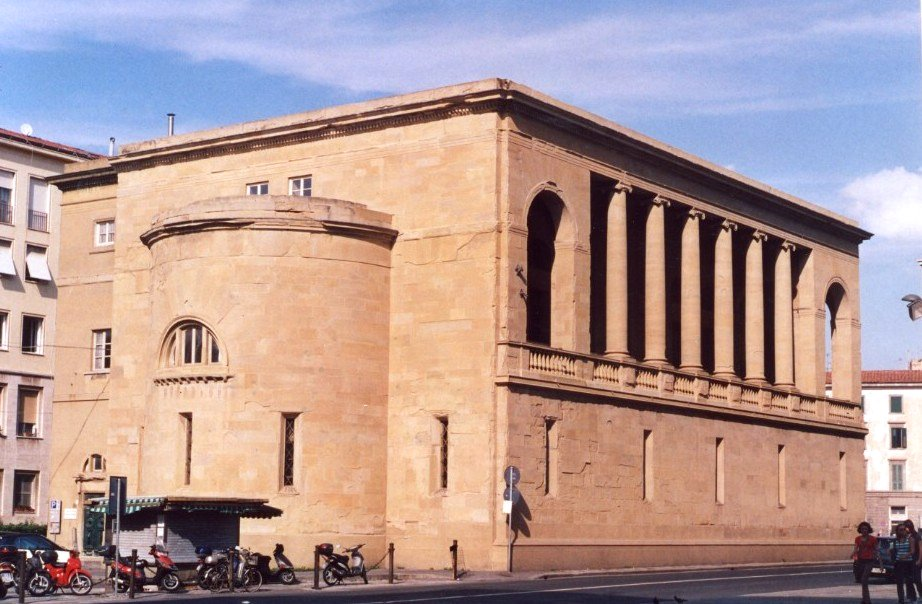
Cisternino di città, Livorno

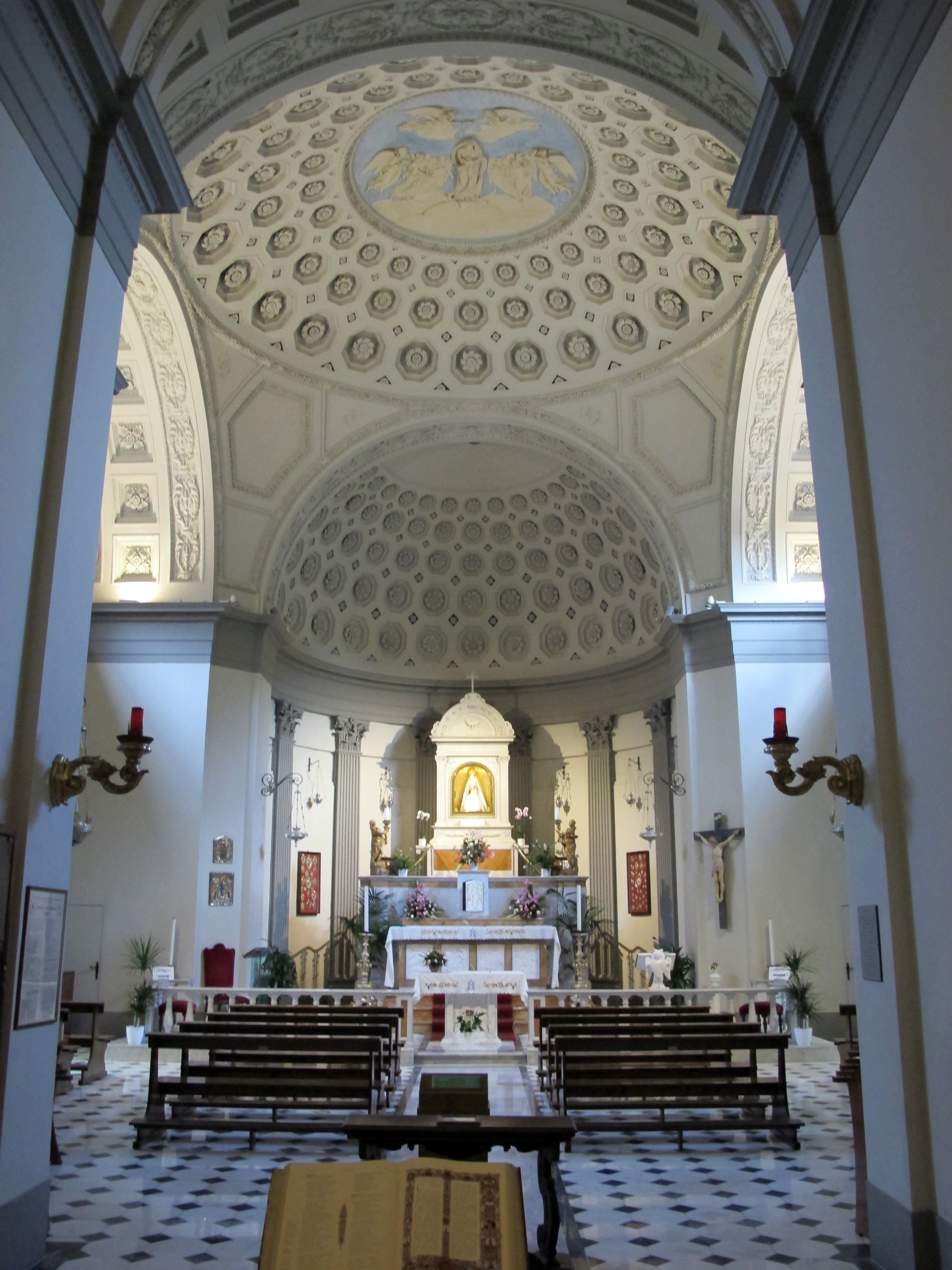
San Romano, Montopoli in Val d'Arno

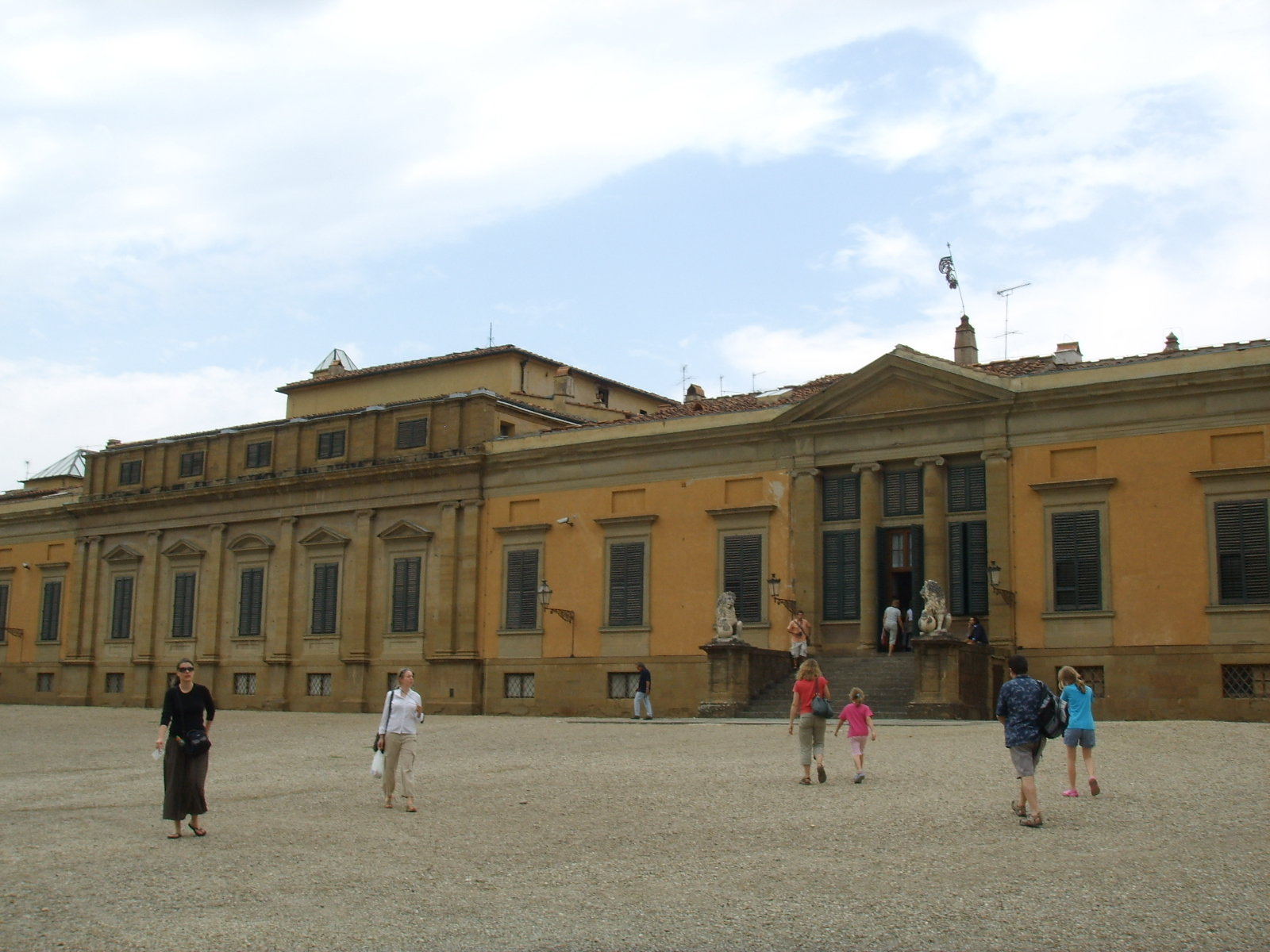
Palazzina della Meridiana, Boboli

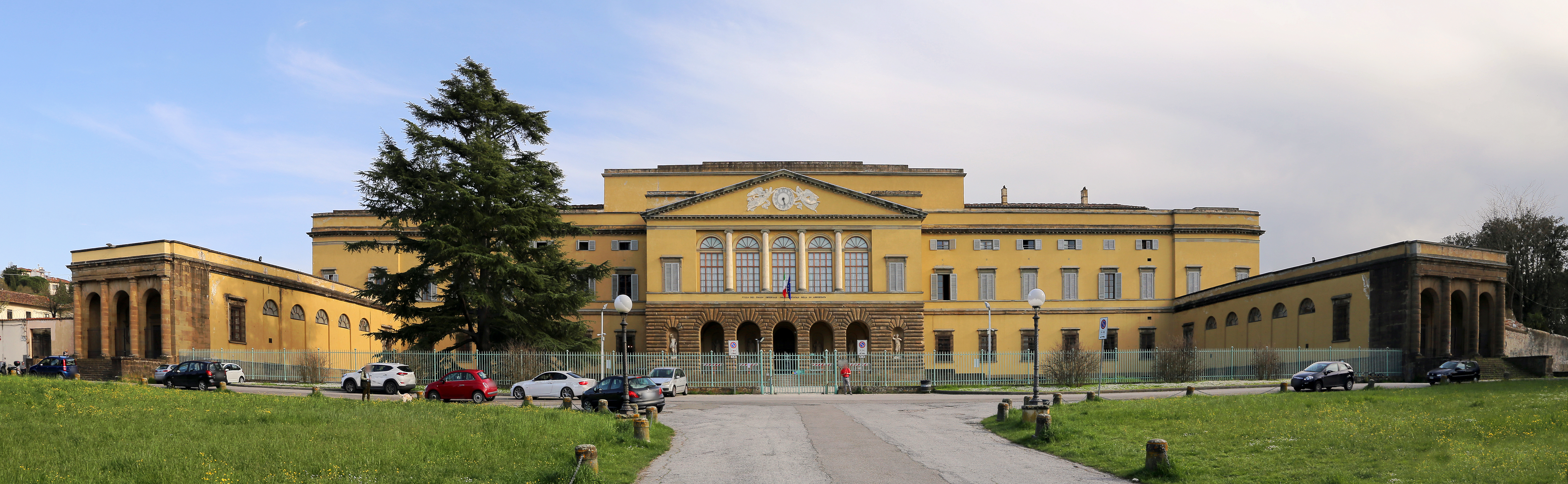
Façade of the Villa del Poggio Imperiale

== Bibliography ==
- Venturi, Luigi (1870). Della vita e delle opere dell'architetto Pasquale Poccianti. Florence: Le Monnier.
- Fossi, Mazzino (1970). "Catalogo del fondo Pasquale Poccianti al Gabinetto Disegni e Stampe degli Uffizi". Antichità viva: Rassegna d'arte. 6.
- Franco Borsi; Gabriele Morolli; Luigi Zangheri, eds. (1974). Firenze e Livorno e l'opera di Pasquale Poccianti nell'età granducale. Rome: Officina Edizioni.
- Francesco Gurrieri, ed. (1974). Pasquale Poccianti: Contributi al convegno per la celebrazione del secondo centenario della nascita. Bibbiena: Uniedit.
- Galletti, Giorgio (1990). "Paoletti, Cacialli e Poccianti: Architetti del regio giardino di Boboli". Boboli '90. Florence: EDIFIR. pp. 505–26.
- Matteoni, Dario (1992). Pasquale Poccianti e l'acquedotto di Livorno. Rome-Bari: Laterza.
- Catini, Raffaella (2015). "POCCIANTI, Pasquale". Dizionario Biografico degli Italiani (in Italian). Vol. 84: Piovene–Ponzo. Rome: Institute of the Italian Encyclopaedia. ISBN 978-88-12-00032-6.
- Gurrieri, Francesco (2021). "Poccianti, Pasquale". The Oxford Dictionary of Architecture. Oxford: Oxford University Press.
