= Villa del Poggio Imperiale =

Former grand ducal villa in Arcetri, Italy

Coordinates: 43.749172°N 11.247430°E

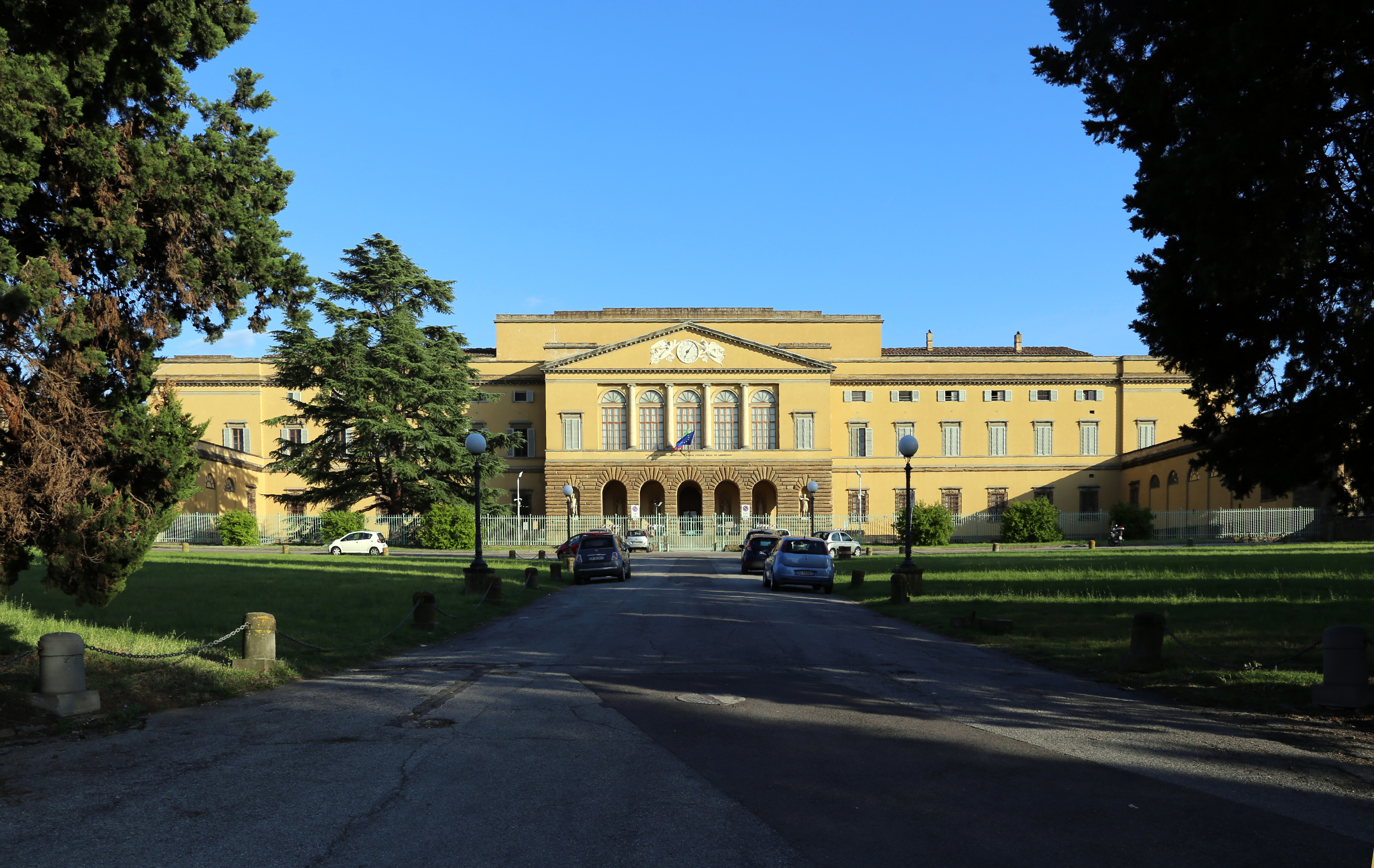
Villa del Poggio Imperiale, front entrance

Villa del Poggio Imperiale (English: Villa of the Imperial Hill) is a predominantly neoclassical former grand ducal villa in Arcetri, just to the south of Florence in Tuscany, central Italy. Beginning as a villa of the Baroncelli of Florence, it was seized by the Medici, became the home of a Medici princess, and a lavish retreat for a Grand Duchess with imperial pretensions. Later given to Napoleon's sister, it was reclaimed by the hereditary rulers of Tuscany before being finally converted to a prestigious girls' school. During its long history, it has often been at the centre of Italy's turbulent history, and has been rebuilt and redesigned many times.

== Medici era ==
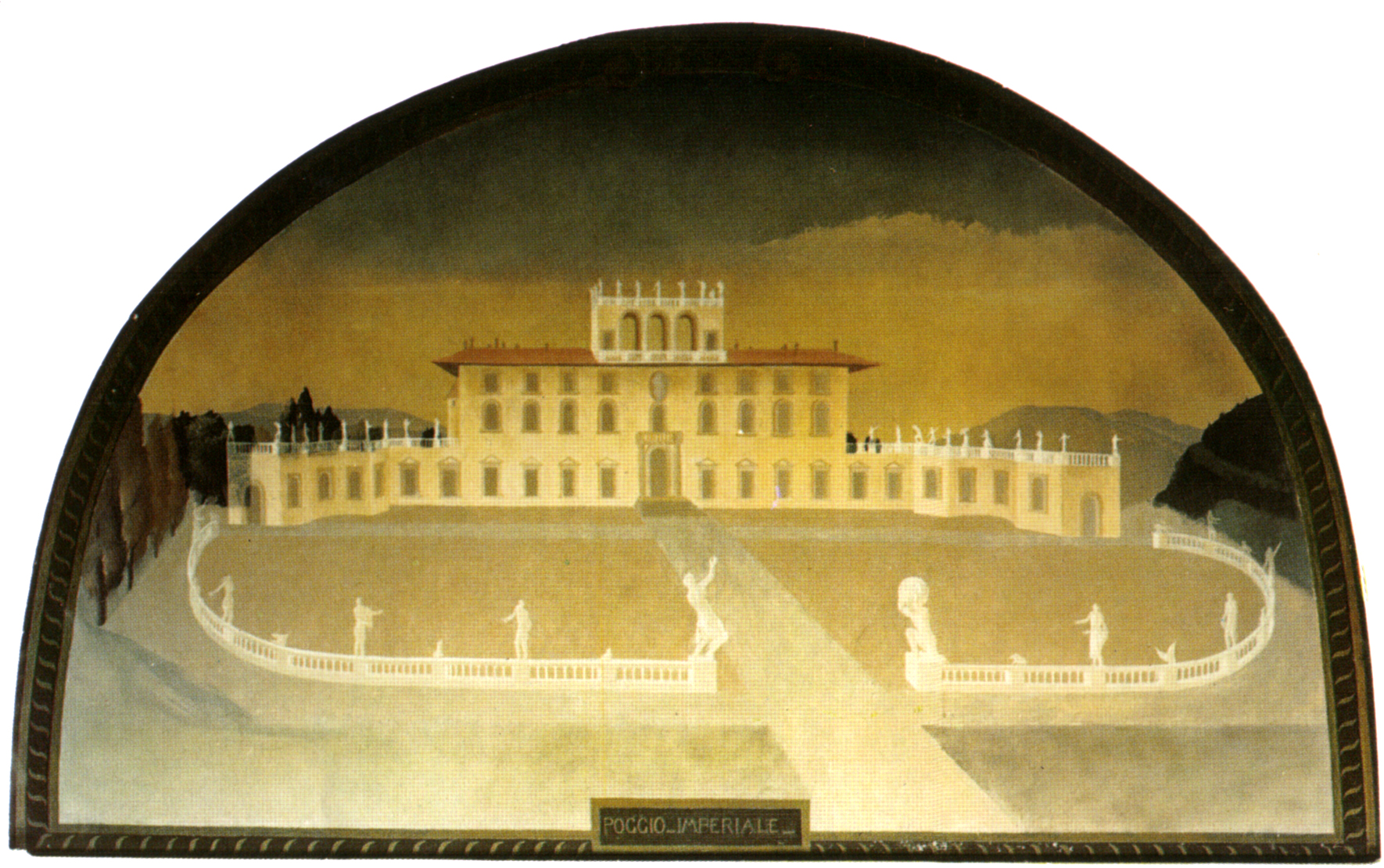
Villa del Poggio Imperiale in the early 18th century

The villa was once the property of the Grand Dukes of Tuscany — the Medici. However, the documented history begins in the 15th century when a small villa on the site known as "Villa del Poggio Baroncelli", was built by the Florentine merchant Jacopo Baroncelli The villa was sold to Bartoncelliu's creditor in 1487, and in turn to Pietro Salviati in 1548. The Salviati were an ancient Florentine noble family. Pietro embellished the property, and added Andrea del Sarto's Assumption of the Virgin to the villa's chapel. In 1565 at Pietro's death the Salviati property was confiscated by Cosimo I, who gave the villa to his daughter Isabella de' Medici who was married to Paolo Giordano Orsini, duke of Bracciano, who made an occasional appearance. At this favoured retreat Isabella held her stylish and intellectual court. Following Isabella's murder by her husband in 1576, the villa passed to her son Virginio Orsini, Duke of Bracciano.

In 1618 the villa was purchased from the Orsini by Archduchess Maria Maddalena of Austria, wife of the future Grand Duke Cosimo II, and was completely rebuilt between 1622 and 1625 to the design of the architect Giulio Parigi. The villa was doubled in size with a large corps de logis flanked by two canted lower wings. The interior of the villa was decorated to the Grand Duchess' requirements by the artist Matteo Rosselli. It was at this time that the villa was linked to the city by a monumental tree-lined avenue and given its "Imperial" title "Villa del Poggio Imperiale" — Maria Magdalena was the sister of Ferdinand II, Holy Roman Emperor.

The building work was very costly, as was the near simultaneous work at the Palazzo Pitti. The Medicis' finances had deteriorated since the time of Cosimo the Elder, and the Grand Duke's decision to close what few branches remained of the Medici Bank at this time meant that the people of Tuscany were forced to pay increased taxes to finance the building projects. Following the death of Cosimo II and the joint regency of Maria Magdalena and her mother-in-law Christine of Lorraine, the extravagances and unprecedented luxury of the court at the Villa del Poggio Imperiale and the Palazzo Pitti severely depleted the Medici finances.

In 1659 the estate was acquired by Ferdinand II and his wife Vittoria della Rovere, who had the villa further enlarged and embellished with marbles and intarsia. However it was to be under the successors to the Medici, the House of Habsburg-Lorraine that the villa was to reach its zenith.

== Habsburg-Lorraine era ==
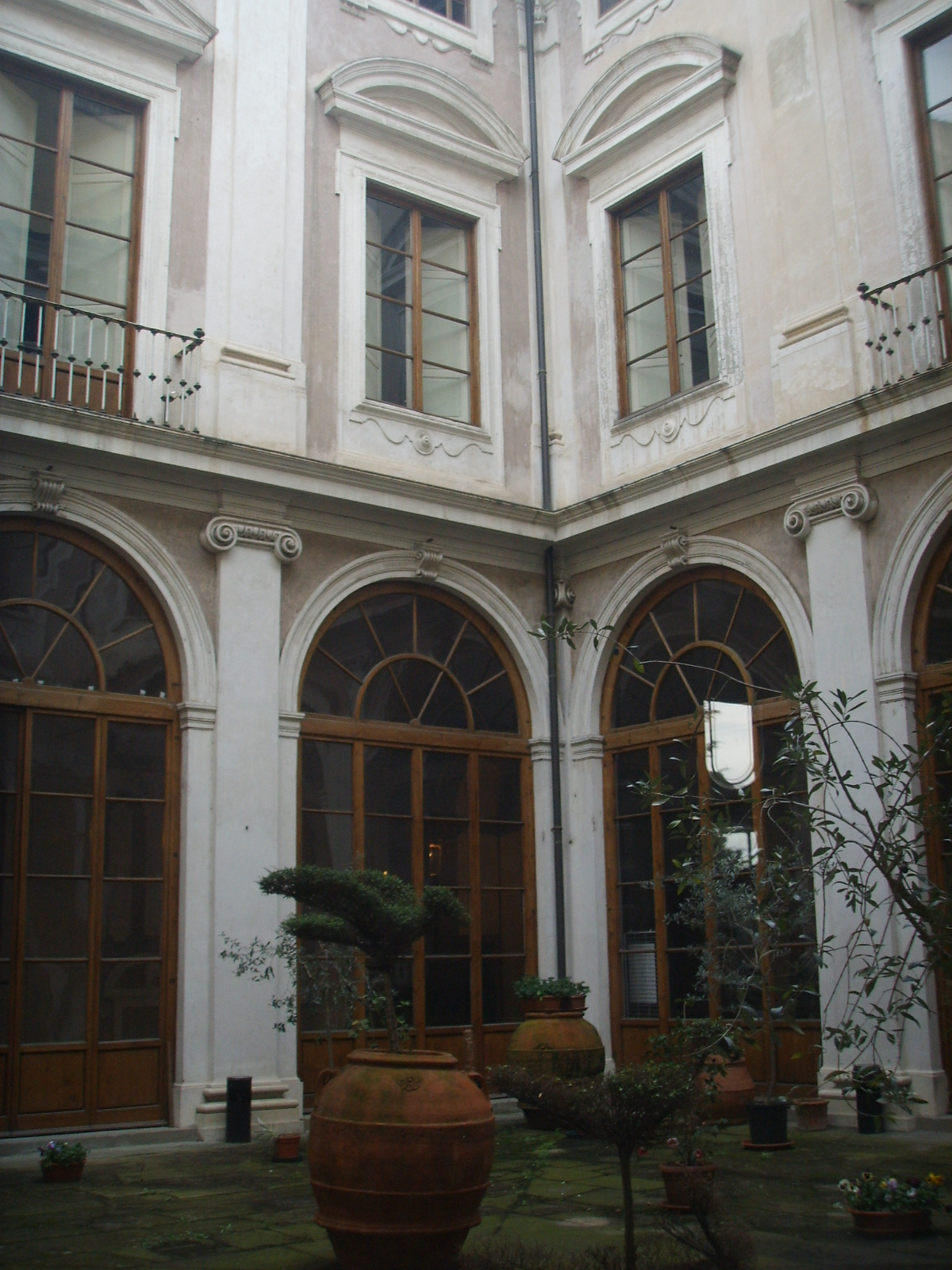
A corner of the main courtyard. The 18th century Baroque segmented pediments above the windows survived the 19th century rebuilding.

The villa was again redesigned and renovated in 1776 by Gaspare Maria Paoletti for Leopold I. The work was prolonged over 15 years and included much stucco and plaster work to the interior. Extra wings were created and various secondary façades were redesigned in the neoclassical style; only the principal façade remained unaltered.

The villa was always a secondary home for Tuscany's ruling families, favoured during spring and autumn. Conveniently close to the court, which resided at the Palazzo Pitti, and surrounded by an estate of 17 farms, it was a rural retreat from the city. However, it was always only one of several villas and palaces available to the grand ducal family, and its popularity and use waxed and waned. At the end of the 18th century, Grand Duke Ferdinand III leased the villa to King Charles Emmanuel IV of Sardinia. Charles Emanuel lived here for just a month from 17 January 1799. It was at the villa that on meeting Count Vittorio Alfieri (companion of Louise Stuart, wife of the "Young Pretender" Charles Edward Stuart, claimant to the British throne), Charles Emanuel uttered the much-quoted phrase "Voici votre tyran!" (Behold your tyrant).

The present monumental principal façade was created in 1807 for the newly elevated Grand Duchess of Tuscany, Elisa Bonaparte. The architect chosen was Giuseppe Cacialli, who designed the great façade using drawings by Paoletti's admirer and imitator Pasquale Poccianti, an architect better known for his later work the Cisternoni of Livorno.

Neoclassicism was a style which evolved as a contrasting reaction to the more ornate Baroque and Rococo styles which preceded it. It was not a trend to make pastiches of classical designs but a force creating a new form of architecture based on simple but rational forms with clear and ordered plans. Milan became the centre of Italy's neoclassical architecture. The works of Leopoldo Pollack, in particular his Villa Belgiojoso, and Giuseppe Piermarini, was similar to the neoclassicism found from London to Munich. However, in Italy, outside Milan these new ideals were often more pronounced and more severe than in northern Europe. Florence was for once the birthplace of a new architectural form, and the façades of the Villa del Poggio Imperiale are austere even by the standards of Italian neoclassical architecture.

The façade is severe and plain, the only variation and ornament being the five-bayed projecting central block. This block has a rusticated ground floor pierced by five arches leading to the inner courtyard. On the first floor is a glazed loggia, also of five bays. This block of only two floors crowned by a low pediment is flanked by two symmetrical wings of even greater severity. Each of two floors with a low mezzanine above are the same height as the central pedimented block, which is given extra prominence by raised parapet behind the pediment.

The severities of the exterior of the villa were compensated for by the exuberance of the interior. A series of large salons were decorated with plaster work in the classical styles. The chapel, frescoed by Francesco Curradi, remained unaltered from the 17th century.

== Post-Risorgimento ==
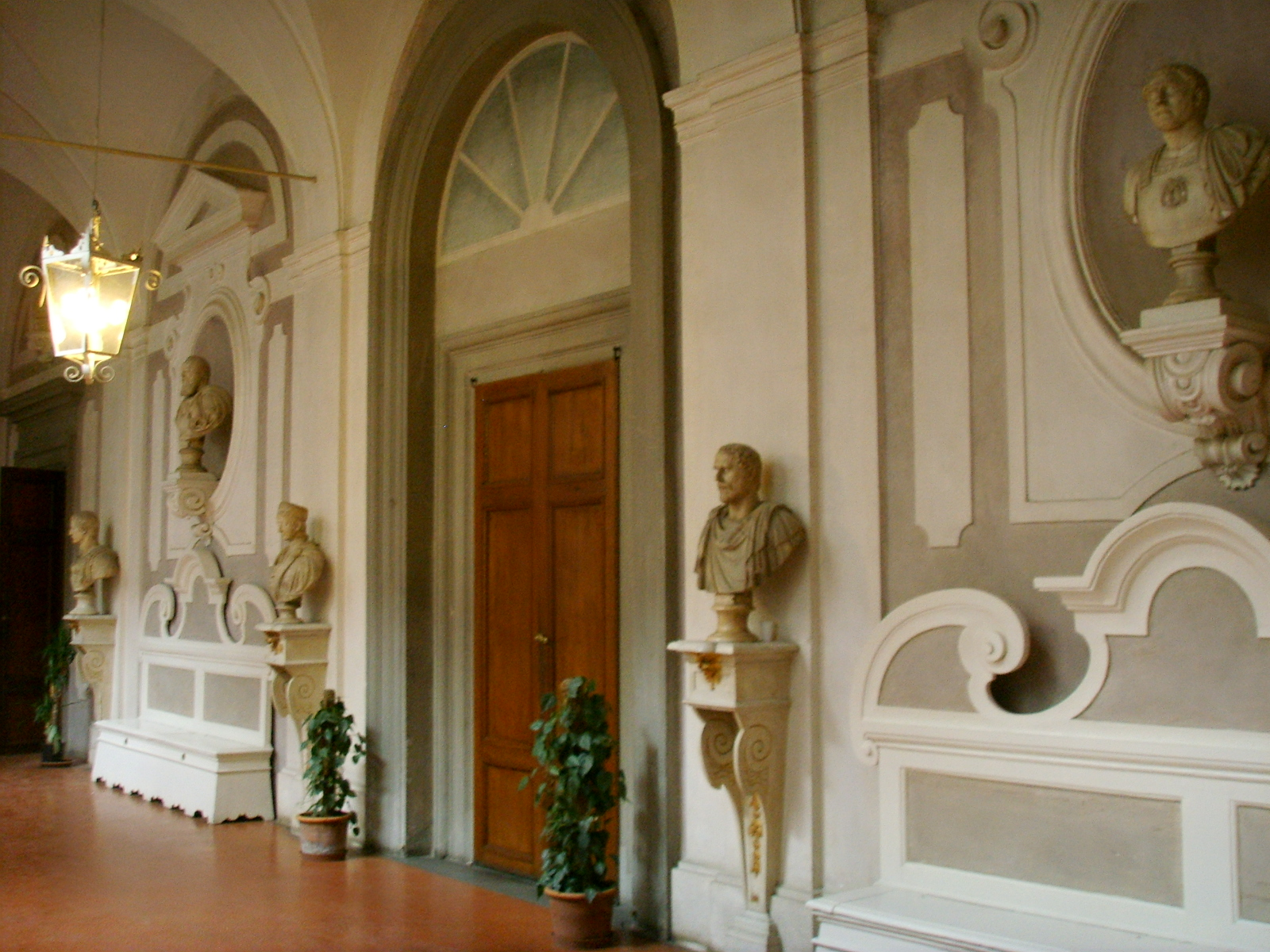
The interior of the glazed arcade which surrounds the principal courtyard

From 1849 the political history of Florence and Tuscany became troubled. Leopold II, the last ruling grand duke, was forced to abdicate following the Second Italian War of Independence. On 27 April 1859, the grand duchy ceased to exist and the last ruling grand duke of Tuscany and his family peacefully quit Florence. It had been a bloodless overthrow and the family left with "respectful farewell greetings of the people." Tuscany now became part of the short lived United Provinces of Central Italy.

On 5 March 1860, Tuscany voted in a referendum to join the Kingdom of Sardinia. This was an important step in the unification of Italy (Risorgimento) which was to follow shortly. In 1865, Florence became for a brief period the capital of a united Italy. The Palazzo Pitti became the main Italian royal palace. The new King of Italy, Victor Emmanuel II, with many palaces at his disposal and an obligation to travel across Italy in the interests of the unification, had little need for a second large palace, such as Villa del Poggio Imperiale, in such close proximity to the Palazzo Pitti.

The unwanted and, by now, fairly neglected villa, now in the ownership of the state, became an exclusive girls' boarding school, the Istituto Statale della Ss. Annunziata. The school had been founded under the patronage of Leopold II and his wife, Maria Anna of Saxony in 1823 to provide education for the daughters of the Florentine nobility. Its original home in the "Via della Scala" in the centre of the city was required for government offices, so in 1865 a simple exchange was made. The school has occupied the building ever since. In January 2004, the school's use of the villa was formalized in an official government announcement that granted the school free use of the state-owned property in perpetuity. Only the state rooms, some of them with frescoes by Matteo Rosselli, are open by appointment to the public.

== Interior furnishing ==
The only remaining part of the original 15th-century Villa di Poggio Baroncelli is the small courtyard. This, the smallest of the villa's three courtyards, is sited immediately though the main entrance. Here, four cloister-like corridors illuminated by segmental windows provide abundant light. The corridors are adorned with antique busts placed on ledges and niches constructed in the eighteenth century. This decoration and embellishment of a substantial collection of antique busts was made by Vittoria della Rovere, who brought the sculptures to Florence to embellish the villa.

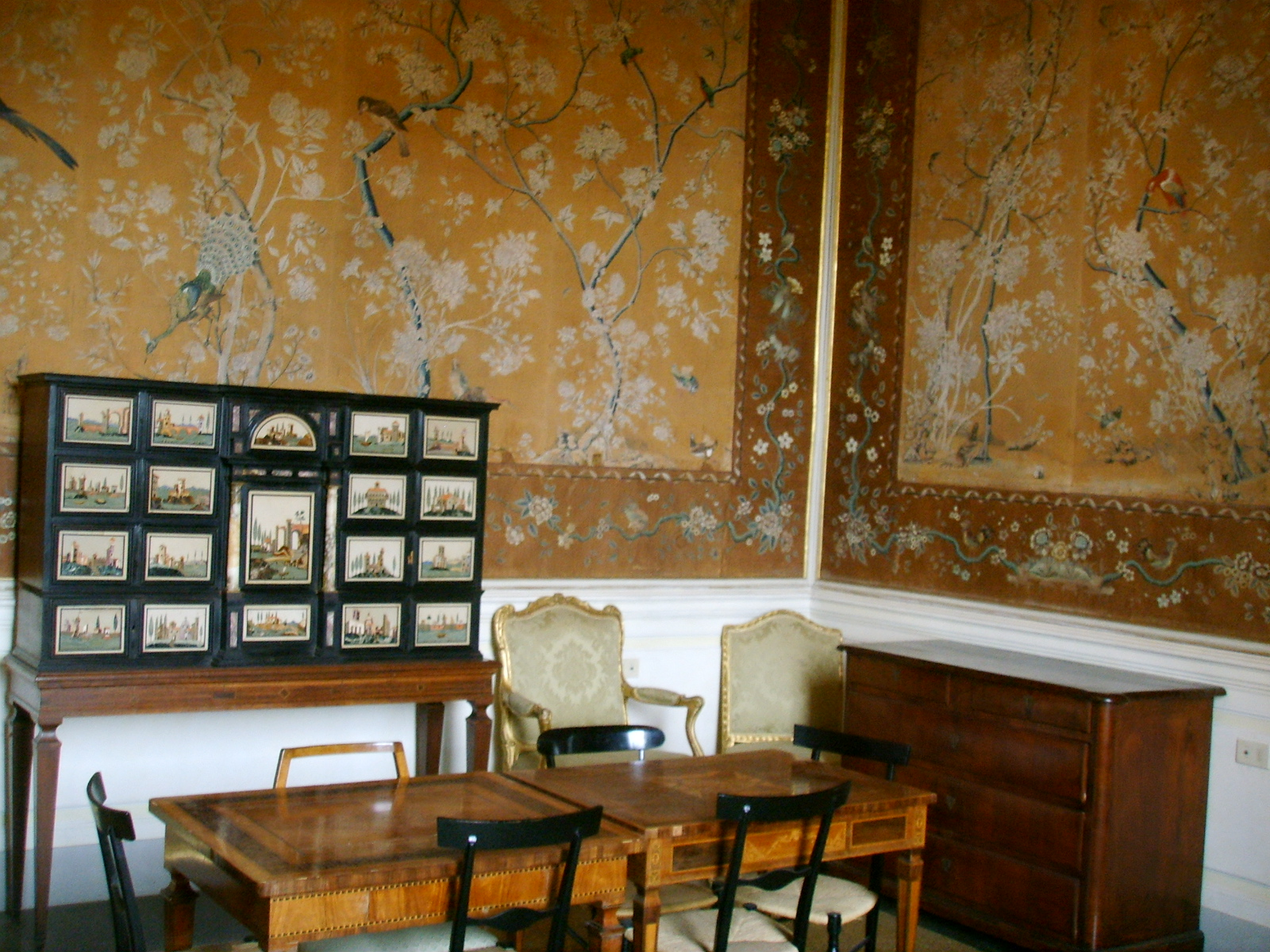
The Chinese room inside the Villa del Poggio Imperiale

On the first floor, one of the most prominent additions to the villa was the development of the Salone delle feste, built between 1776 and 1783, and decorated with embellished stucco reliefs which are predominantly white in color.

In one of the adjacent "Chinese" wings, are four rooms decorated with circa 1775 Chinese hand-crafted wallpaper, which came from Canton workshops, specialized for export, and represented the important influence of the chinoiserie style then being experienced throughout Europe. The refined paintings of the China wing represent an idealized world of flowers, exotic birds and scenes of daily Chinese life, often borrowed from the period literature depicting Chinese life and culture. A fifth room contained, originally, 88 pictures (about 20 × 30 cm each) which were displayed with these various scenes from Chinese life. These probably came from a collection that was in the villa from about 1784. Today, only about twenty are displayed, with their repair and reconditioning being underway in an ongoing restoration project, which will eventually recreate their original layout.

Many Chinese paintings, probably from the same source as those of the villa, were given by Leopold I to his sister Maria Caroline, who became Queen consort, and de facto ruler, of Naples and Sicily. A portion of these painting were taken by her to Palermo where they remain today in the Palazzo dei Normanni and Palazzina Cinese.

== Interior design ==
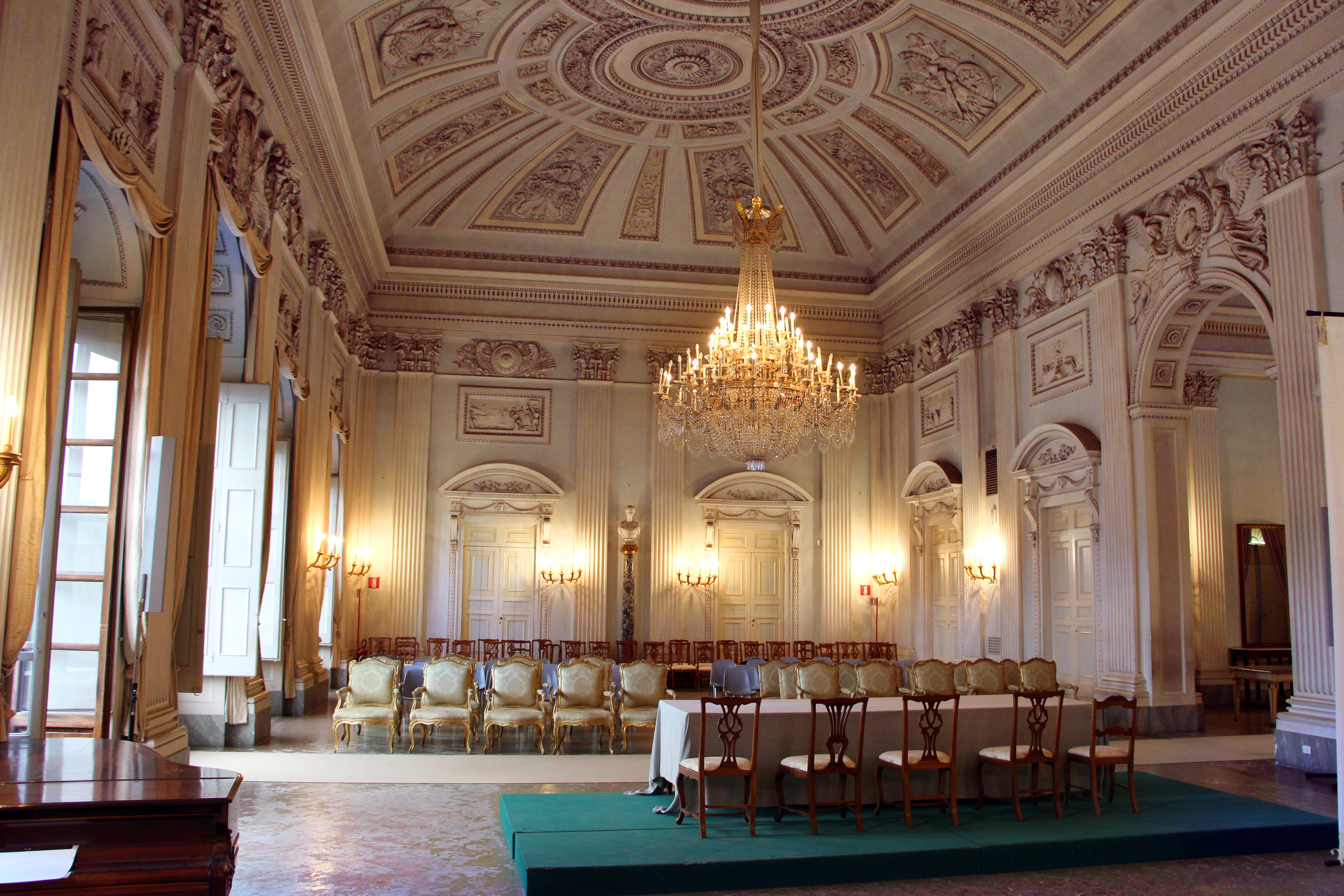
The neoclassical plaster-work of the White Salon

The original 1487 plan of the Poggio Imperiale bears little resemblance to the present day neoclassical layout. Originally, the building was a country manor house belonging to the Baroncelli family; this passed to the Pandolfini family, and eventually in 1622 it was sold to the Grand Duchess Maria Maddelena of Austria. This change of ownership was to mark the beginning of a slow transformation from provincial country manor to grand, imperial villa. The Grand Duchess immediately commissioned the building's "restoration, enlargement, and embellishment."

The commission was granted to the architect Giulio Parigi, who between 1622 and 1625, introduced a more ornate Baroque style, and the later version of Baroque, Rococo. This was achieved with an expanded floor plan, lengthening the façades and elevations. These longer façades were in the late 18th century deprived of their Baroque ornament to create the chaste austere neoclassical architecture seen at the villa today.

The eminent architectural historian Carlo Cresti describes Parigi's 1624 design as "yielding a corps de logis flanked by two lower, symmetrical wings with terraces and semicircular concave profiles. Inside the villa, Parigi restructured the old central courtyard and the rooms of the grand-ducal apartment, which were frescoed by Matteo Rosselli and his pupils."

A further period of enhancement took place when the villa passed to the Grand Duchess Vittoria della Rovere who created the ground-floor rooms situated at the crest of the inner courtyard designed by Giacinto Maria Marmi. Between 1681 and 1683, the courtyard and its surrounding loggias were further re-designed by the architect Giovanni Battista Foggini.

Between 1766 and 1783, the architect Gaspare Paoletti, during the third and final renovation of the villa, accomplished the definitive restructuring of the villa to twice its previous size. Paoletti added the two flanking inner courtyards to the central courtyard, and also designed the rear façade and the great ballroom on the piano nobile. This was embellished with the notable stuccowork by Giocondo and Grato Albertolli.

The principal façade, however, was not to be transformed until ownership of the villa passed to Maria Louisa of Bourbon, the Queen of Etruria, who in 1806 assigned the project to the architect Pasquale Poccianti. Poccianti extended this effort of complete neoclassical transformation (of the façade) to include a rusticated five-bay portico flanked by a theater and a chapel. The façade was completed under the eventual ownership of Napoleon's sister Elisa Baciocchi, then the Grand Duchess of Tuscany, who hired the architect Giuseppe Cacialli to freely adapt the completion of Poccianti's original plans. The free adaptation by Cacialli allowed him to supplement the original piano nobile with luminous peristyle including stuccowork and wall paintings. With the return of the House of Lorraine in 1814, the previously designed chapel and guard house were at last built, and a number of rooms were embellished by the painters Domenico Nani and Giorgio Angiolini].

== The chapel for the Annunciation ==
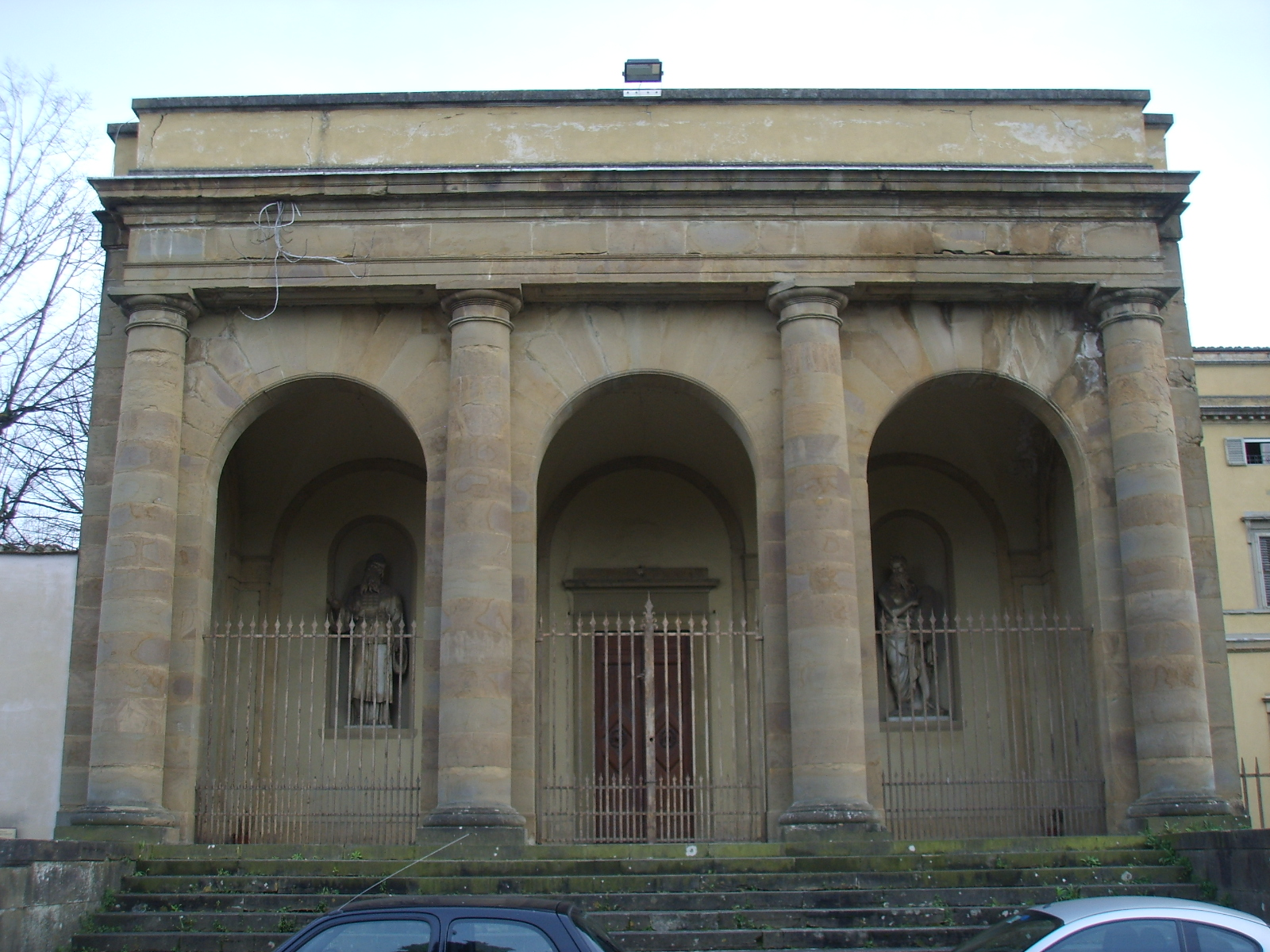
La cappella

With the extensive redesign and renovation in the eighteenth century, many of the original chapels in the villa were lost. Today, only the Chapel of the Annunciation remains which the architect Giuseppe Cacialli included as part of the 1820 neoclassical renovation.

The design of the chapel is divided into three naves with a semicircular tribune. The redesign preserved the pre-existing eighteenth century decorations and embellishments which included statues of the Virtues in separate niches, as well as stucco friezes depicting biblical scenes on the walls and ceiling dome in tempura depicting the Assumption of the Virgin by Francesco Ninci.

The remarkable wealth of the works of art and opulent reliquary of priestly use held in the chapel have been expertly cataloged and documented in the short volume by Brigida D'Avanzo in Italian titled: "Oggetti di arte sacra alla Villa del Poggio Imperiale Firenze" in 1990. Two of the dozens of exceptional holdings in the chapel include the "Il Ritrovamento della Croce" of 1686 attributed to Luca Giordano, and the "Madonna col Bambino e S. Giovannino" of the sixteenth century attributed to the school of Puligo.

A short essay in the D'Avanzo volume by Rosanna Caterina Proto Pisani documents several dozen of the objects of art held in the chapel. The extensive history of the relation of these exceptional holdings together with their cross-listing and shared use with the Uffizi Gallery in Florence, along with the art holdings identified with the villa in general, has yet to be completely studied as a separate subject of the relation between the villa and the Uffizi Gallery.

== Gallery ==
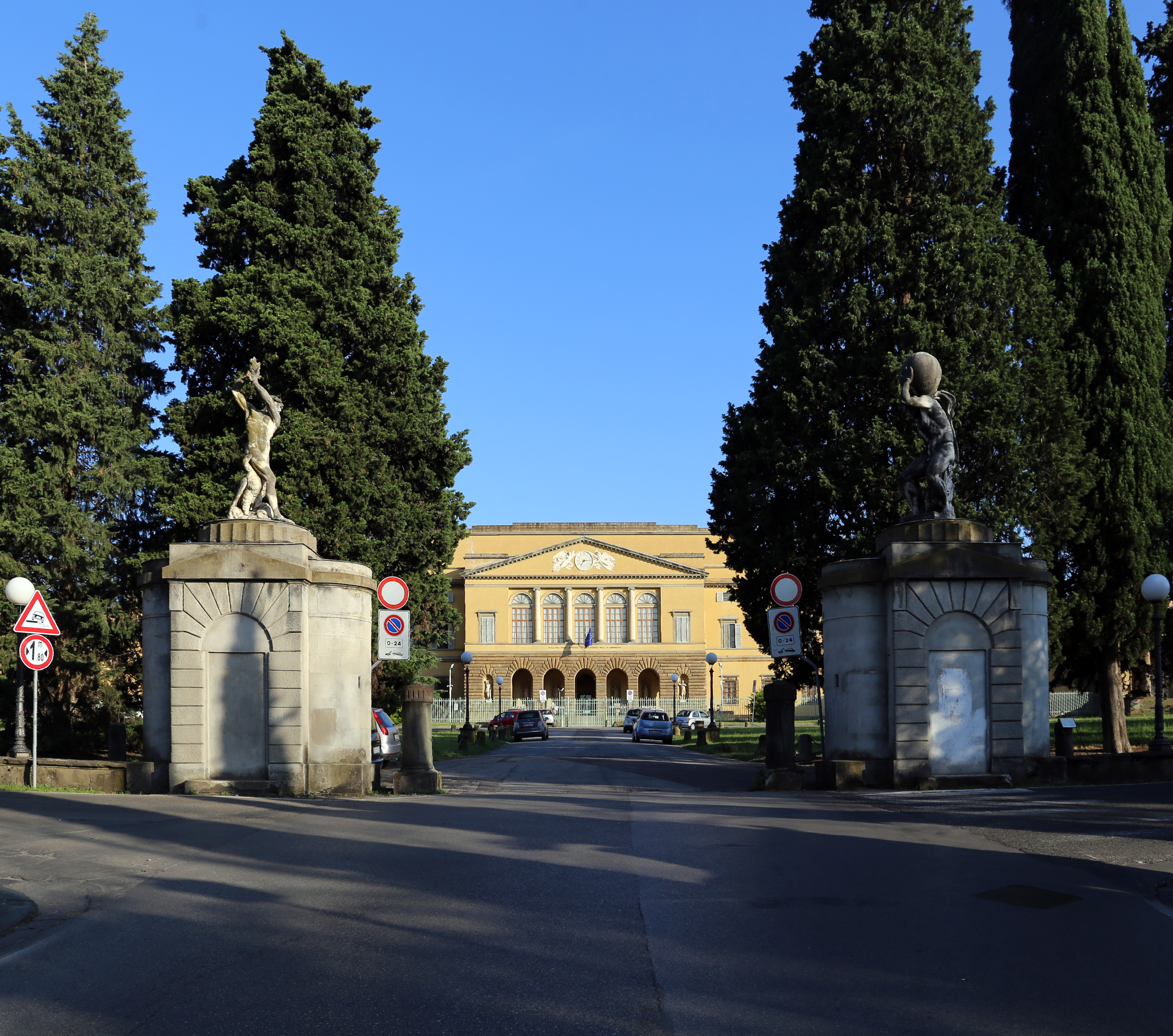

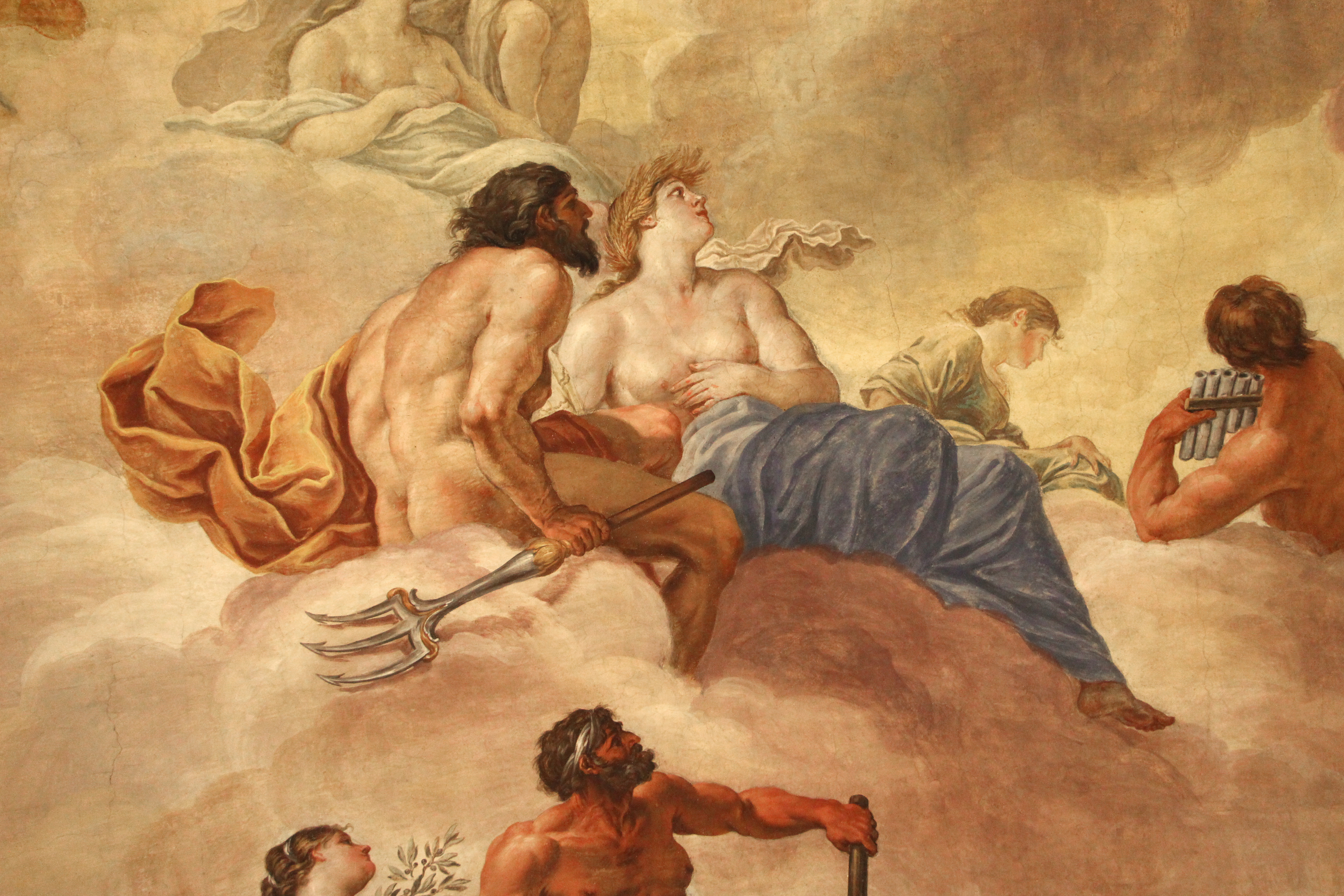

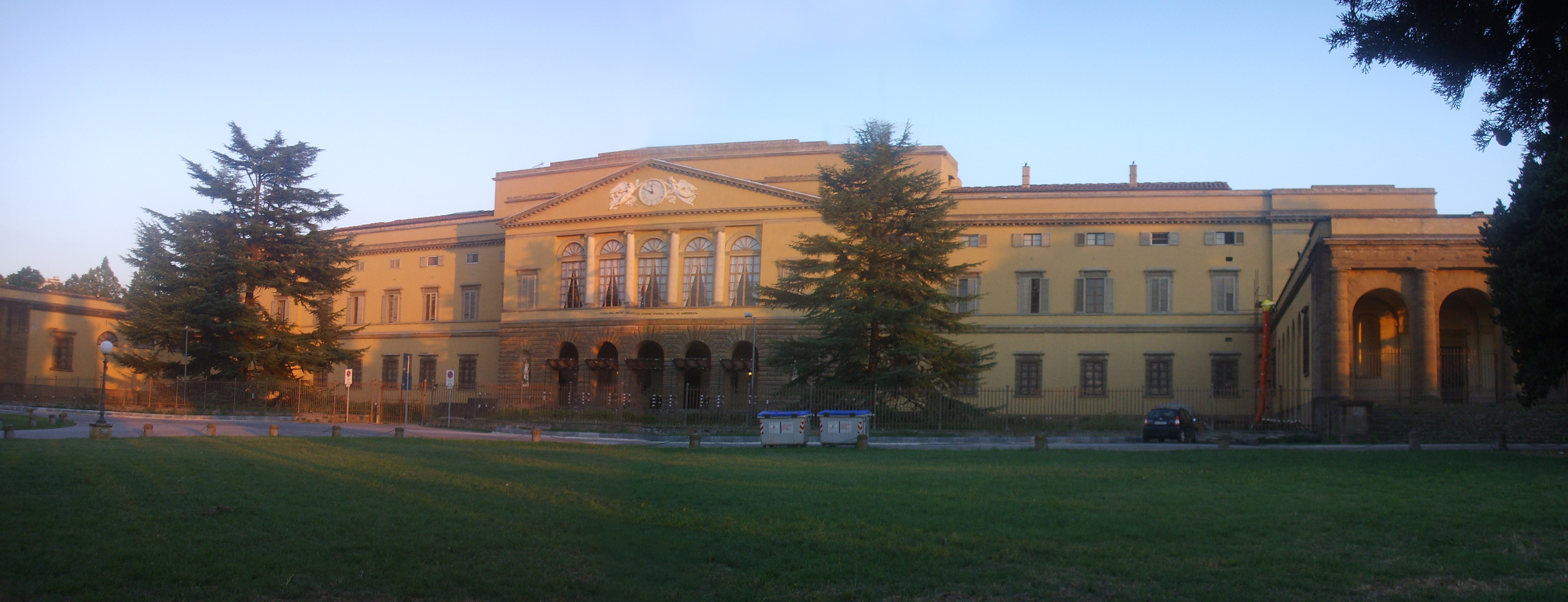

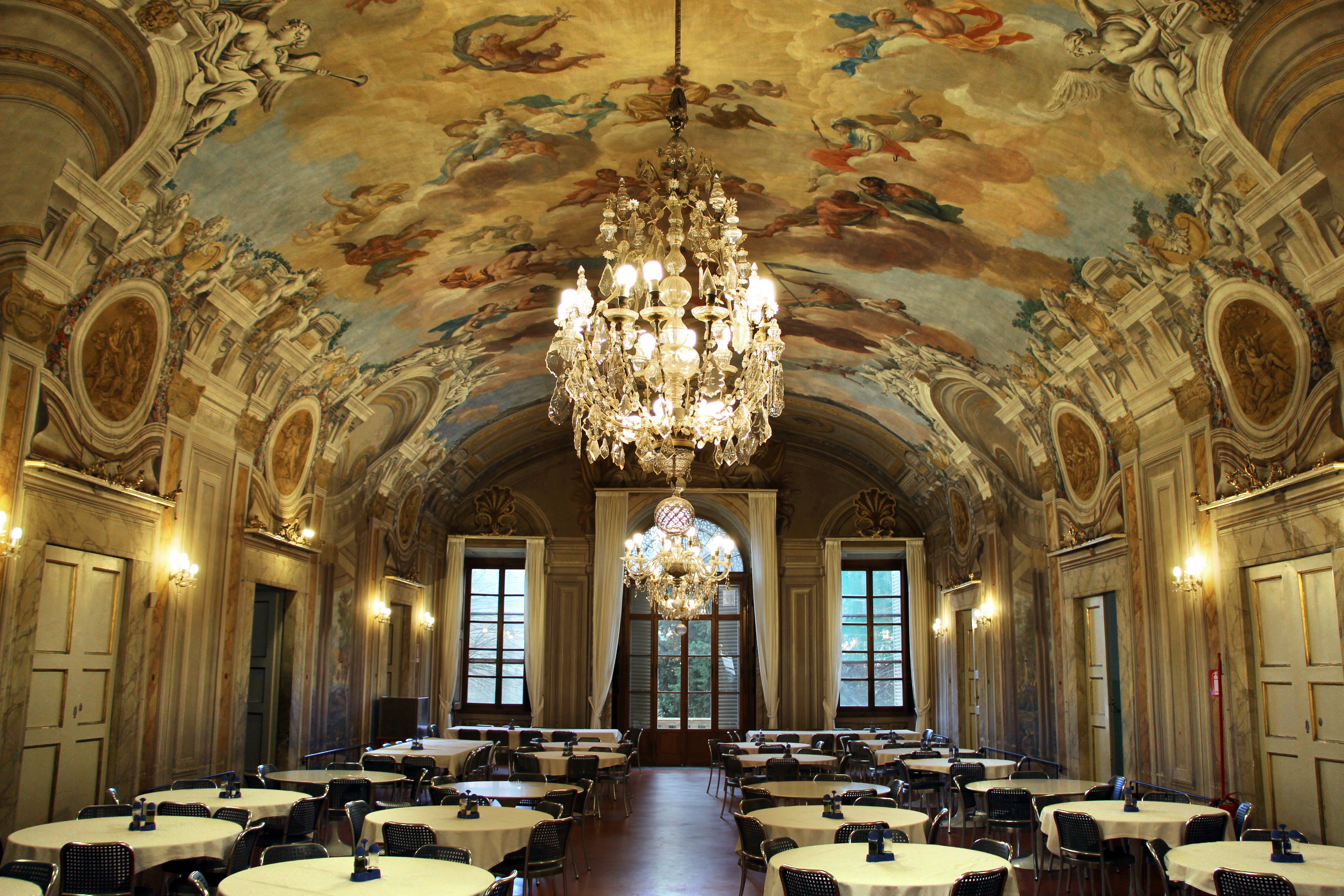

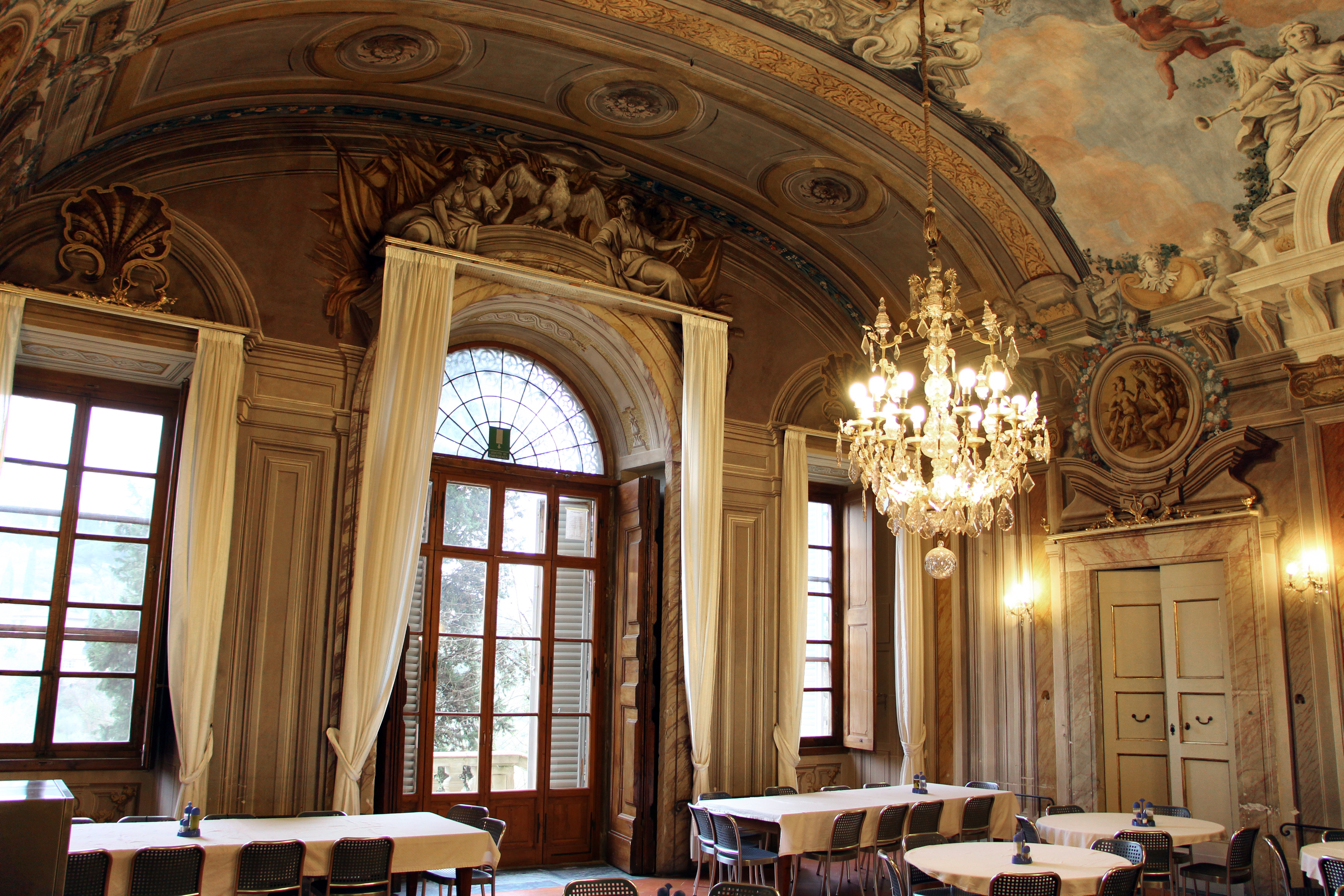

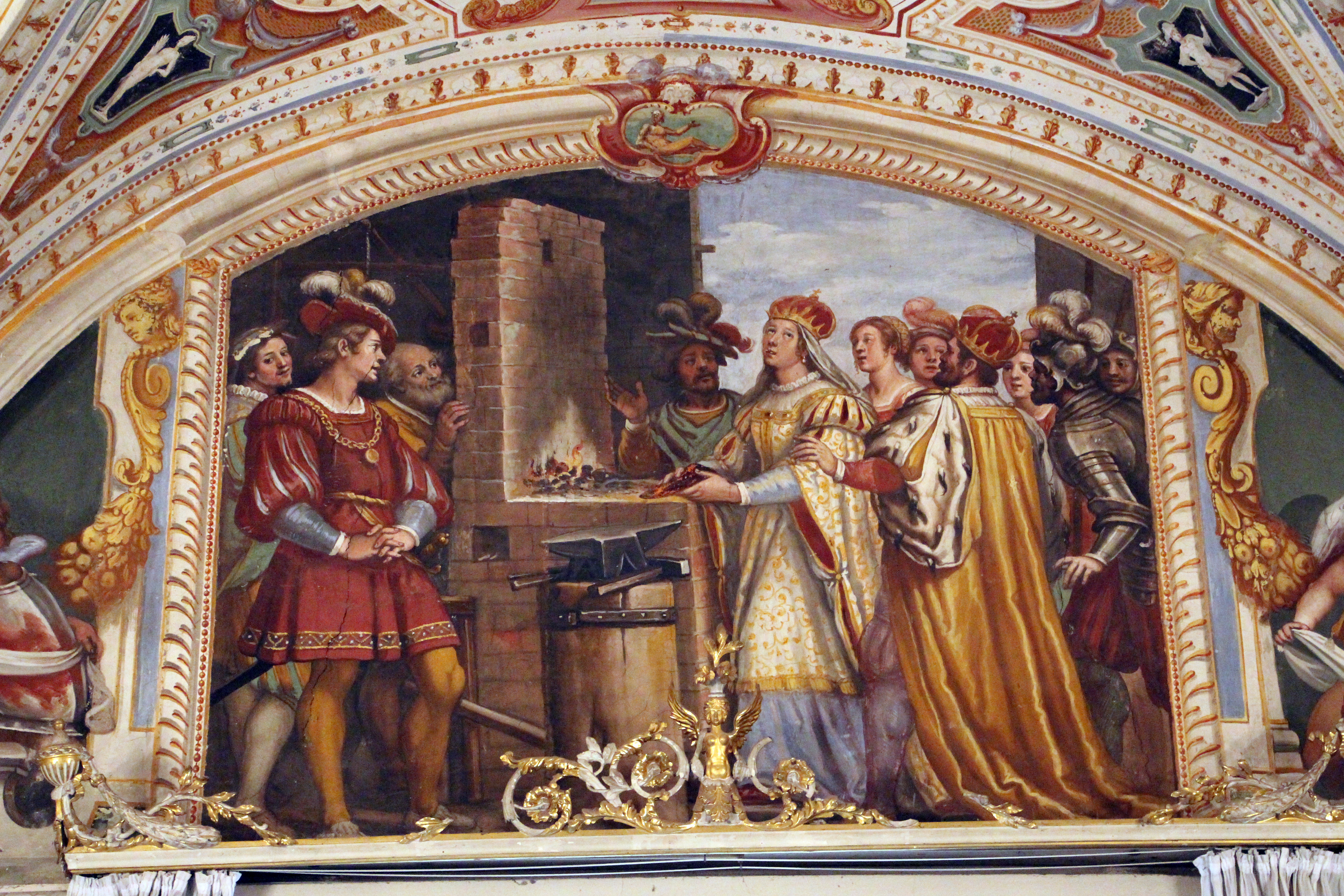

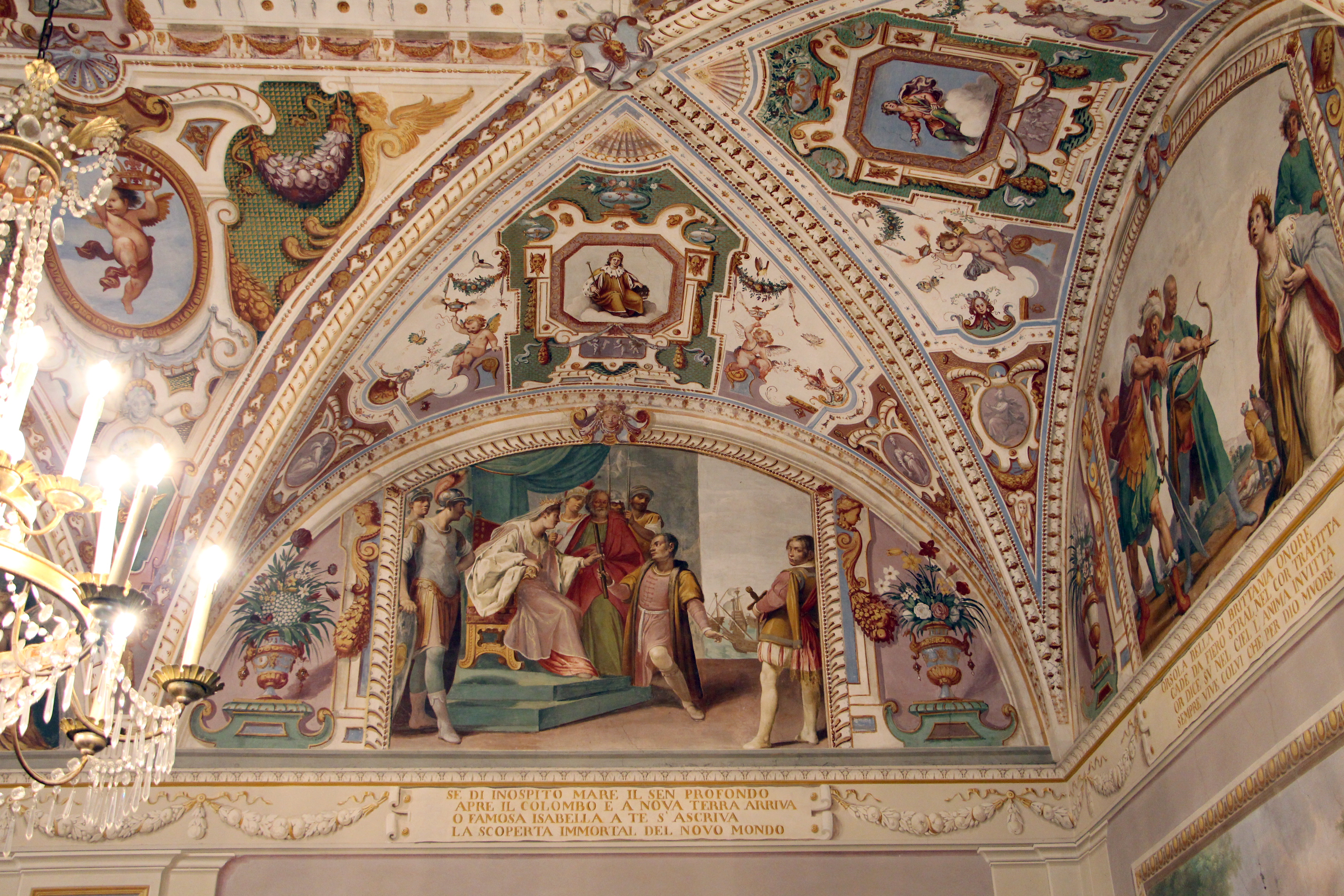

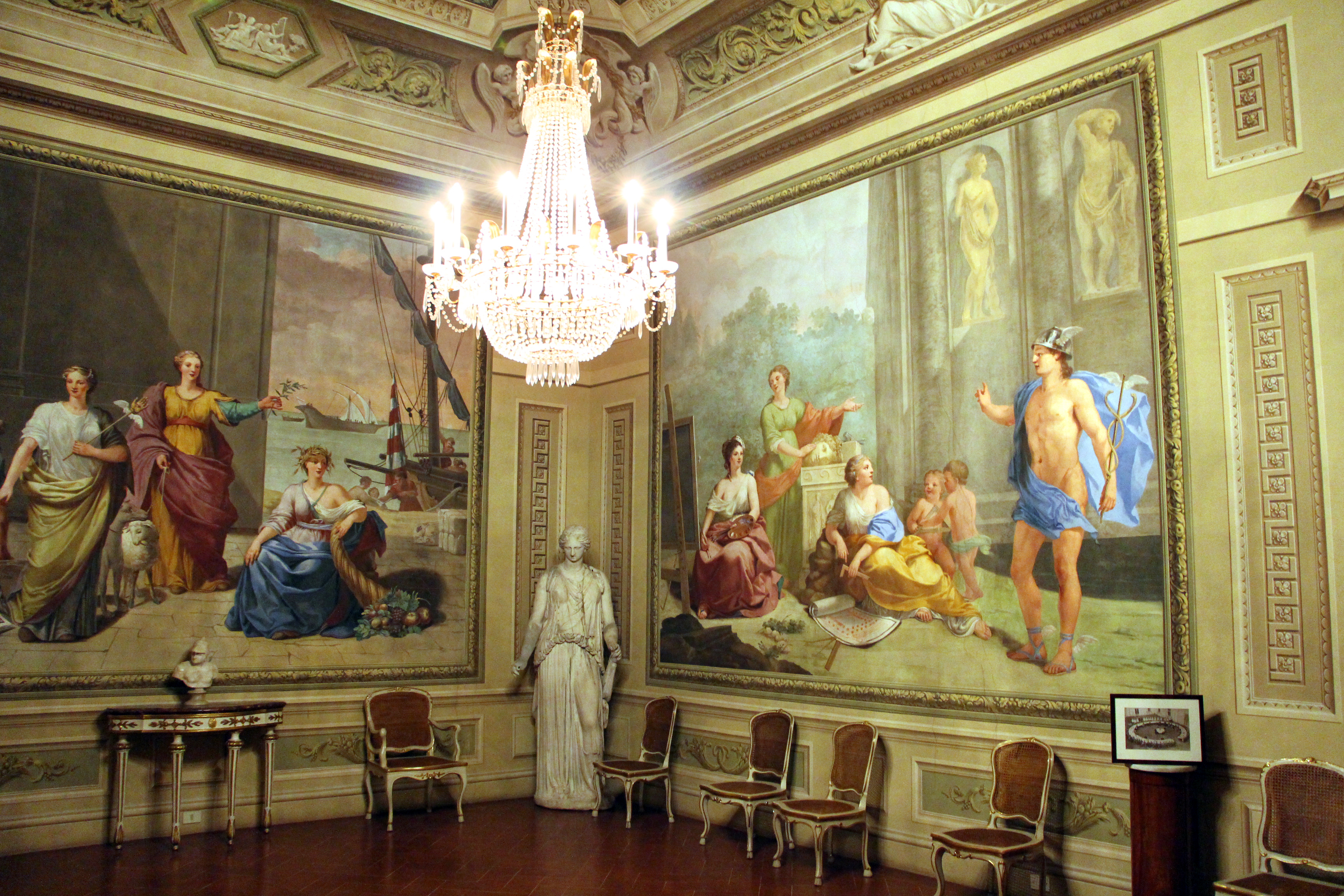

== See also ==
- Medici villas

== Sources ==
- dal Lago, Adalbert (1969). Villas and Palaces of Europe. Paul Hamlyn. SBN 600012352.
- Vaughan, Herbert M. (1910). The Last Stuart Queen: Louise, Countess of Albany, Her Life & Letters. London: Duckworth.
- Cesati, Franco (1999). Medici. Firenze: La Mandragora. ISBN 88-85957-36-6.
- Chiarini, Marco, ed. (2001). Pitti Palace. Livorno: Sillabe s.r.l. ISBN 88-8347-047-8.
