= Peter Speeth =

German architect (1772–1831)

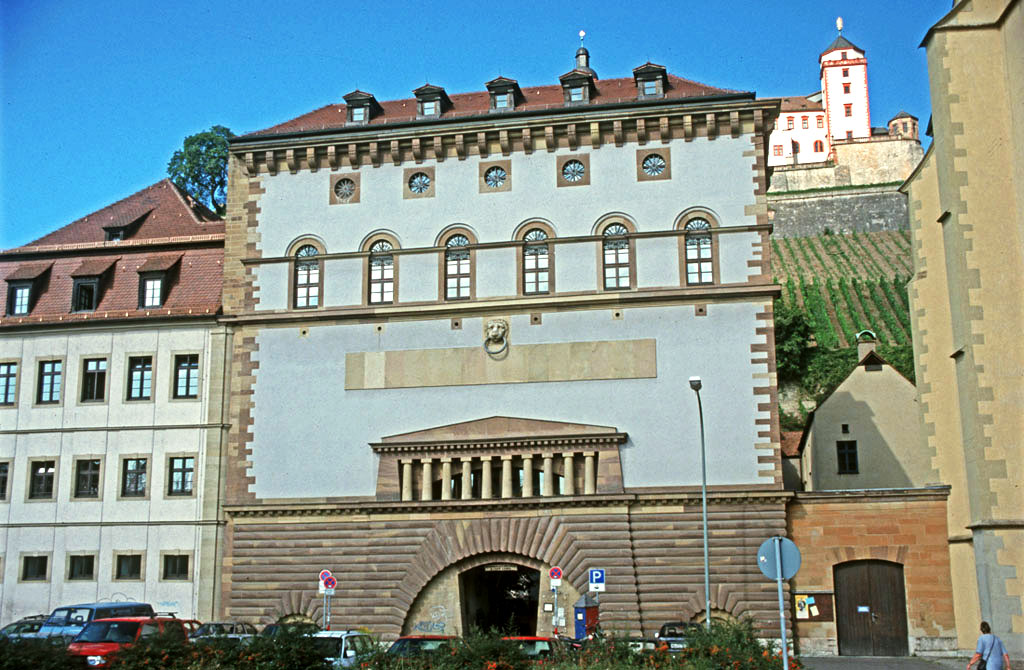
Women's Penitentiary, Würzburg, 1809-10

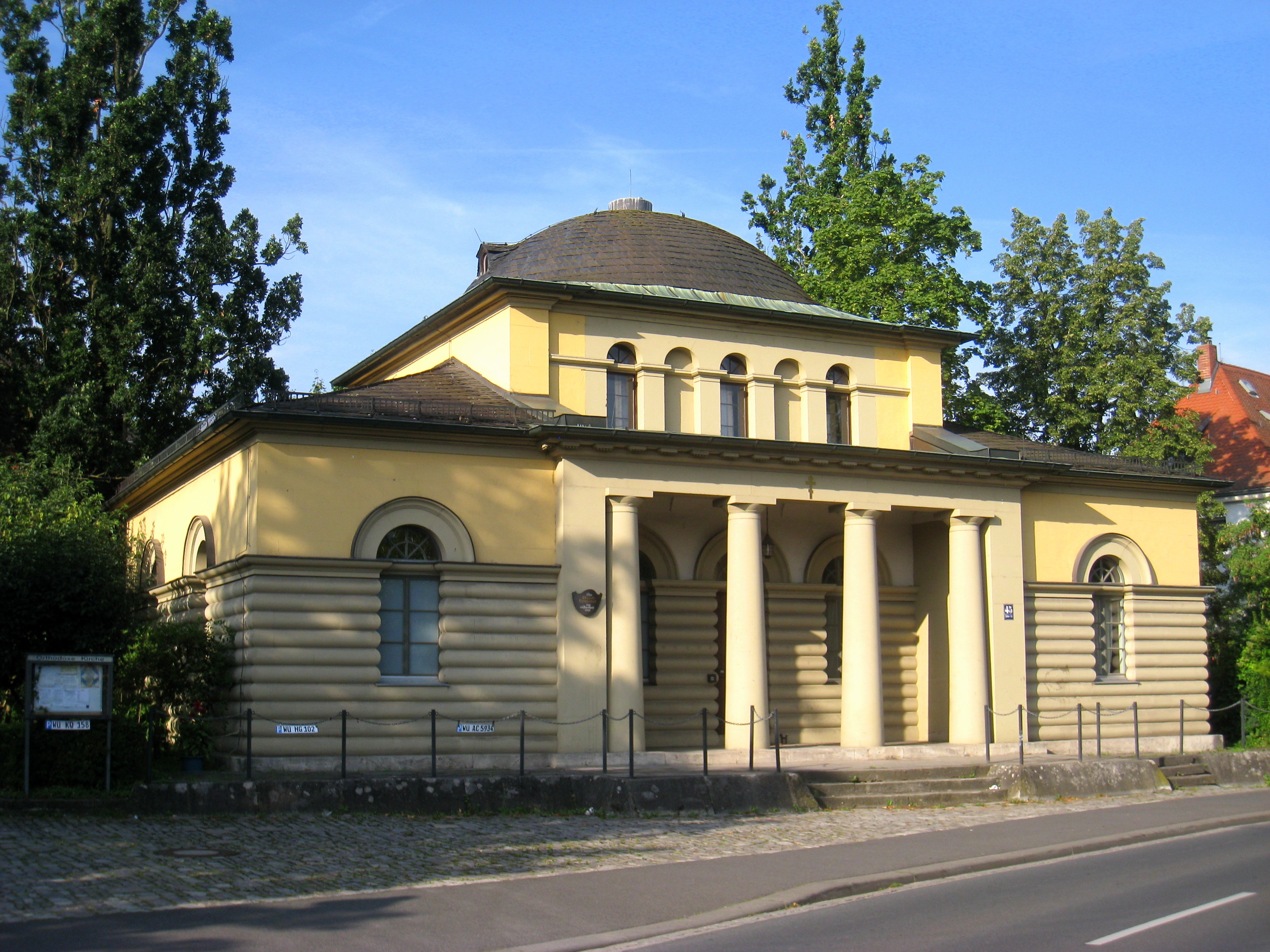
Zeller Torhaus (guard house), 1814

Peter Speeth (29 November 1772 – 1831) was a German architect.

Speeth was born in Mannheim and worked in Frankfurt from 1788 to 1794 under Nicolas de Pigage (1723–1796), in Heidelberg from 1797, and from 1804 at Amorbach for the Prince of Leiningen. In 1807 he moved to Würzburg in the service of Ferdinand III, Grand Duke of Tuscany, where he designed the Women's Penitentiary (1809–1810), an early and striking Neo-Renaissance design, as well as the Zeller Torhaus guard house (1814) which resembles Claude-Nicolas Ledoux's barrières for Paris, and the Gerichtsdienerhaus (House of the Court Usher, 1811–13). His employment for the Grand Duke ended in 1815, and in 1826 he moved to Russia. He died in Odessa in 1831.

== Selected works ==
- Frauenzuchthaus (Former Women's Penitentiary) - Burkaderstraße 44, Würzburg, 1809–1810
- Gerichtsdienerhaus (House of the Court Usher) - 9 Turmgasse, Würzburg (1811–13, much altered)
- Direktorwohnhaus der Musikschule - Paradeplatz 1, Würzburg, 1812–1815
- Zeller Torhaus (guard house) -, 45 Zeller Strasse, 1814
- Wohnhaus des Landrichters Wirth - Sanderstraße 31, Würzburg, 1821
- Church of St. John the Baptist - Unterhohenried, near Hassfurt, 1812–1817
- Metropolitan Church - Kishinev, Russia (begun 1826)
