= Aqueduct of Colognole =

Water system in Livorno

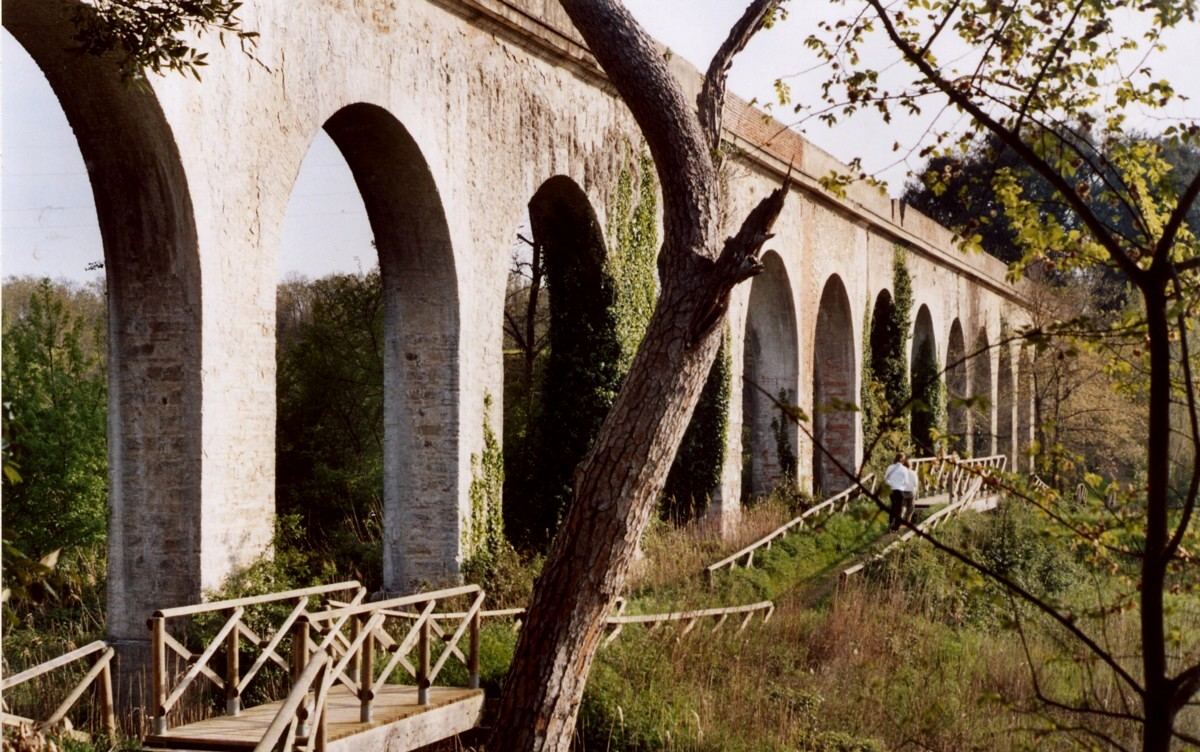
Acquedotto Leopoldino.

The Acquedotto Leopoldino (also known as the "Acquedotto di Colognole") and the neoclassical cisterns of Livorno were part of a sophisticated scheme to not only provide water to Livorno, but also clean it. The scheme was centred on the 18 km (11 mi) long aqueduct which runs south to north bringing water to the city from Colognole. This feat of engineering first carried water to the city in 1816, long before its completion. It was Livorno's sole water supply until 1912, still serving some areas of the city.

The aqueduct was commissioned in 1792 by Ferdinand III, Grand Duke of Tuscany. Construction began in 1793 to plans drawn by the architect Giuseppe Salvetti, replacing an earlier aqueduct constructed in the 16th century by Ferdinand de' Medici. Work stopped in 1799 on the death of Salvetti and, because of the political difficulties and upheavals in Tuscany caused by the first disruptive phases of the Napoleonic occupation of Tuscany, did not resume until 1806, when Maria Louisa, regent of Etruria, acting for her infant son, appointed the architect Riccardo Calocchieri to supervise the work. Later, in 1809, during the French occupation of Tuscany and reign of Elisa Bonaparte, Poccianti was appointed by the newly formed "Comune of Livorno" to oversee the project and under his direction work continued until 1824, the date usually considered as that of the aqueduct's completion. However, modifications were always being implemented, and after Poccianti's death in 1858, the project was continued by his successor Angiolo della Valle.

The aqueduct crosses valleys in the Livorno Hills, supported on great arches which tower above the forests and slopes of macchie below.

== Sources ==
- F. Borsi, G. Morolli, L. Zangheri, Firenze e Livorno e l’opera di Pasquale Poccianti, Roma 1974.
- Comune di Livorno, Le opere pubbliche. Grandi opere e Piani di Recupero Urbano, Livorno 2003.
- F. Furbetta, L'approvvigionamento idrico della città di Livorno, Pisa 1960.
- D. Matteoni, Pasquale Poccianti e l'acquedotto di Livorno, Roma - Bari 1992.
- Pasquale Poccianti architetto, 1774 - 1858. Contributi al convegno per la celebrazione del secondo centenario della nascita, a cura di F. Gurrieri e L. Zangheri, Firenze 1977.
- G. Piombanti, Guida storica ed artistica della città e dei dintorni di Livorno, Livorno 1903.
