= Luigi de Cambray Digny =

Italian neoclassical architect

Luigi de Cambray-Digny
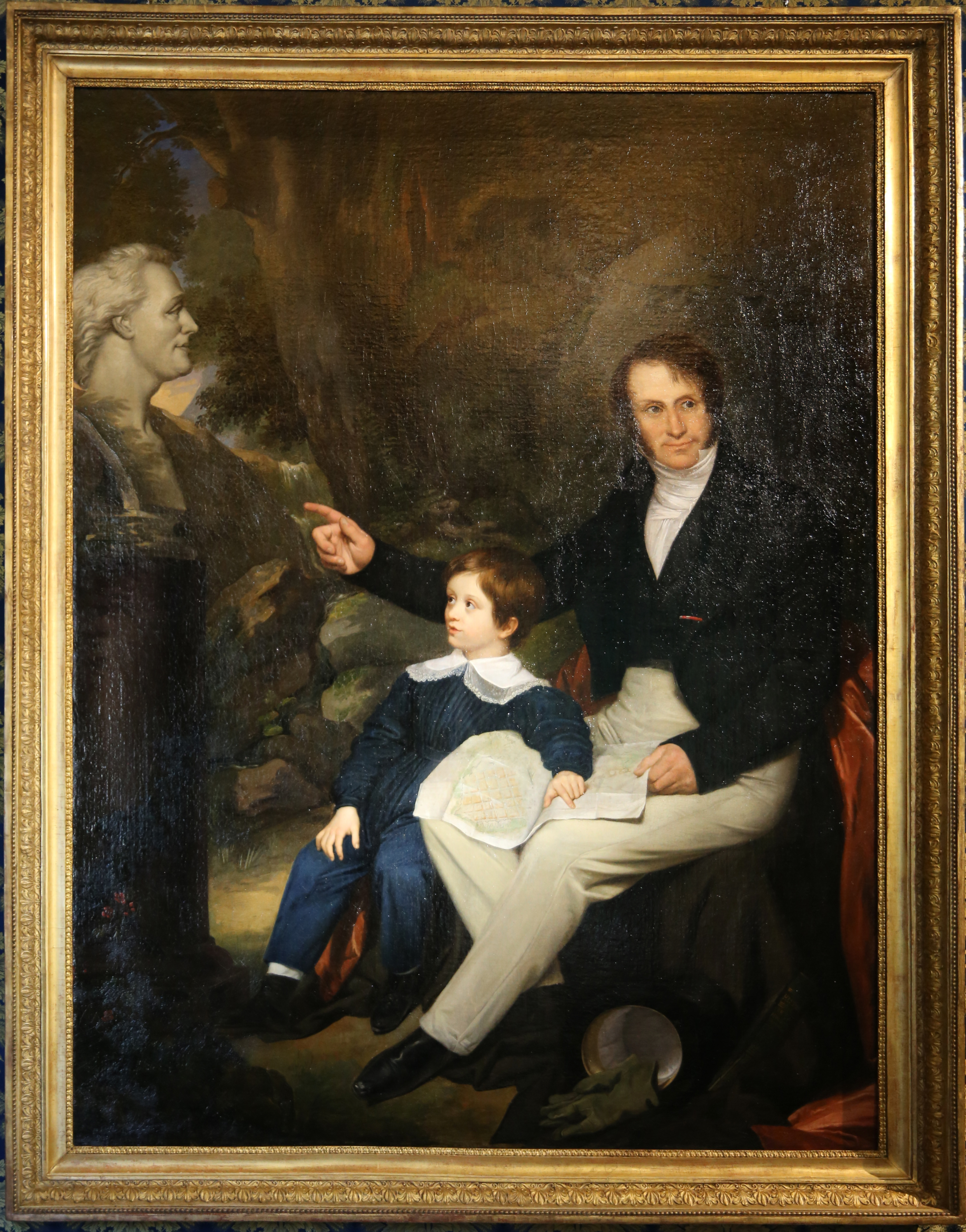
- Giuseppe Bezzuoli, Portrait of Luigi de Cambray Digny with his son Luigi Guglielmo, 1827
- Born: 14 February 1778; Florence, Grand Duchy of Tuscany
- Died: 22 February 1843 (aged 65); Florence, Grand Duchy of Tuscany
- Known for: Architecture
- Movement: Neoclassicism

Luigi de Cambray-Digny (February 14, 1778 – February 22, 1843) was an Italian neoclassical architect, landscape designer and teacher, active in Tuscany between the end of the seventeenth century and the mid-1800s.

== Biography ==
Luigi de Cambray Digny was born in Florence on February 14, 1778. He studied architecture at the Accademia di Belle Arti di Firenze under Gaspare Maria Paoletti, the leader of the Tuscan neoclassical school, and won prizes for his projects in 1797; in 1801 he became a professor of architecture there and presented a project for a Pantheon of famous men to the Accademia.

=== Career ===
In 1803 de Cambray-Digny began to work for the Grand Duchy of Tuscany, making important contacts in the Napoleonic period at a time when he is known to have become a freemason. His first important commission, received from the Accademia di Belle Arti, was the remodelling of the famous Cappella di San Luca (1810–13) in Santissima Annunziata, Florence, as part of a project to transform the convent into the new seat of the French bishop.

Following the restoration in 1814 of the House of Lorraine to the Grand Duchy of Tuscany, he played a prime role in the reconstruction of the Scrittoio delle Reali Fabbriche, first as Secretary, then Director (1820–35). This important department controlled all public building within the Grand Duchy. De Cambray-Digny was a prolific architect; he undertook many works of restoration and adaptation of public and private buildings in Florence and Prato as well as projects for the building of the port, the shipyard and the area to the north of the Via Grande (1817) in Livorno; he also built the Filigare Customs House (1818) at the Passo Appenninico della Raticosa, the churches of Santa Maria Assunta (1822–7), Montecatini, and Santi Pietro e Paolo (1829–35), Livorno, and a number of important theatres, including the Teatro Metastasio (1827–30) in Prato.

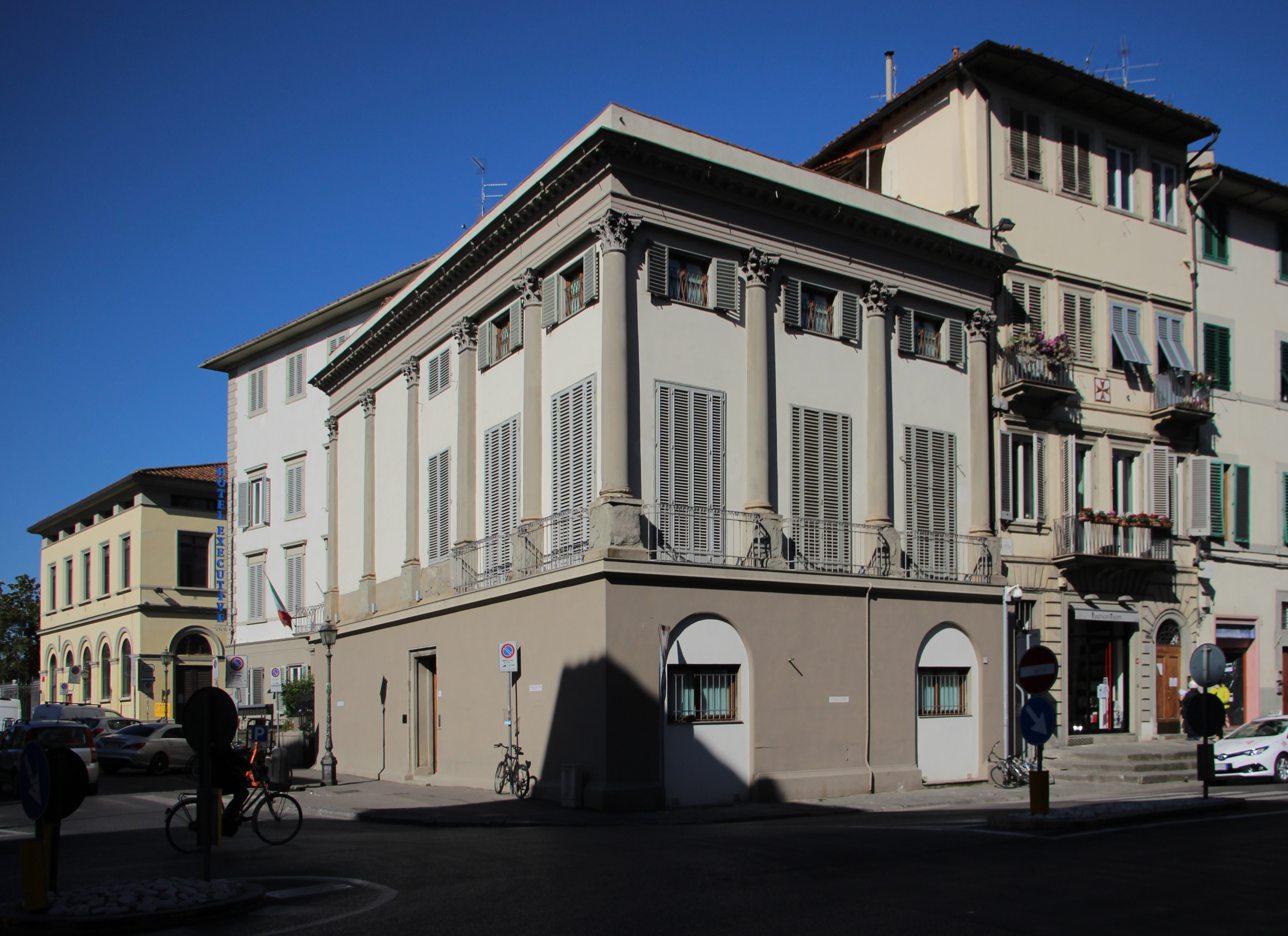
Loggia Reale (1819–27), Via del Prato, Florence

His early neoclassical style is particularly evident in the hunting lodge of Montili (1818), which stands above the park of the former Villa Medici in Pratolino, and the Loggia Reale (1819–27), Via del Prato, Florence. Garden design was an important aspect of his career; three of his best-known gardens, for the Orti Oricellari (1813), the Marchese Pietro Torrigiani (1813–14), both in Florence, and the Puccini di Scornio (1821–8) at Pistoia, were transformed into romantic parks, with architectural additions following the philosophical and symbolic tendency, particularly masonic, in Tuscan architecture that was invented and championed by Giuseppe Manetti.

Many drawings for unexecuted official projects survive in Florentine archives; they combine a grandiose urban vision typical of the Napoleonic years with Vitruvian classical motifs. Luigi de Cambray Digny died in Florence on February 22, 1843. His son, Luigi Guglielmo Cambray-Digny, was the first mayor of Florence and Minister of Finance of the Kingdom of Italy from 1867 to 1869.

== Bibliography ==
- Contrucci, P. (1845). Monumenti del Giardino Puccini. Pistoia: Cino.
- Cresti, C.; Zangheri, L. (1978). Architetti e ingegneri nella Toscana dell'Ottocento. Florence: Uniedit. pp. 74–5.
- Dezzi Bardeschi, M. (1984). "Le macchine desideranti". In A. Vezzosi (ed.). Il giardino romantico. Florence: Alinea. pp. 41–5.
- Gargiolli, G. (1843). "Elogio del Conte Luigi de Cambray-Digny". Atti della Imperiale e Reale Accademia dei Georgofili. 21: 250–56.
- Ginori Lisci, L. (1972). I palazzi di Firenze. Florence: Giunti, G. Barbèra. pp. 93, 305, 791.
- Romanelli, Raffaele (1974). "Cambray Digny, Luigi de". Dizionario Biografico degli Italiani (in Italian). Vol. 17: Calvart–Canefri. Rome: Istituto dell'Enciclopedia Italiana. ISBN 978-88-12-00032-6.
