= Palazzina Reale delle Cascine =

Coordinates: 43°46′57.84″N 11°13′12.13″E

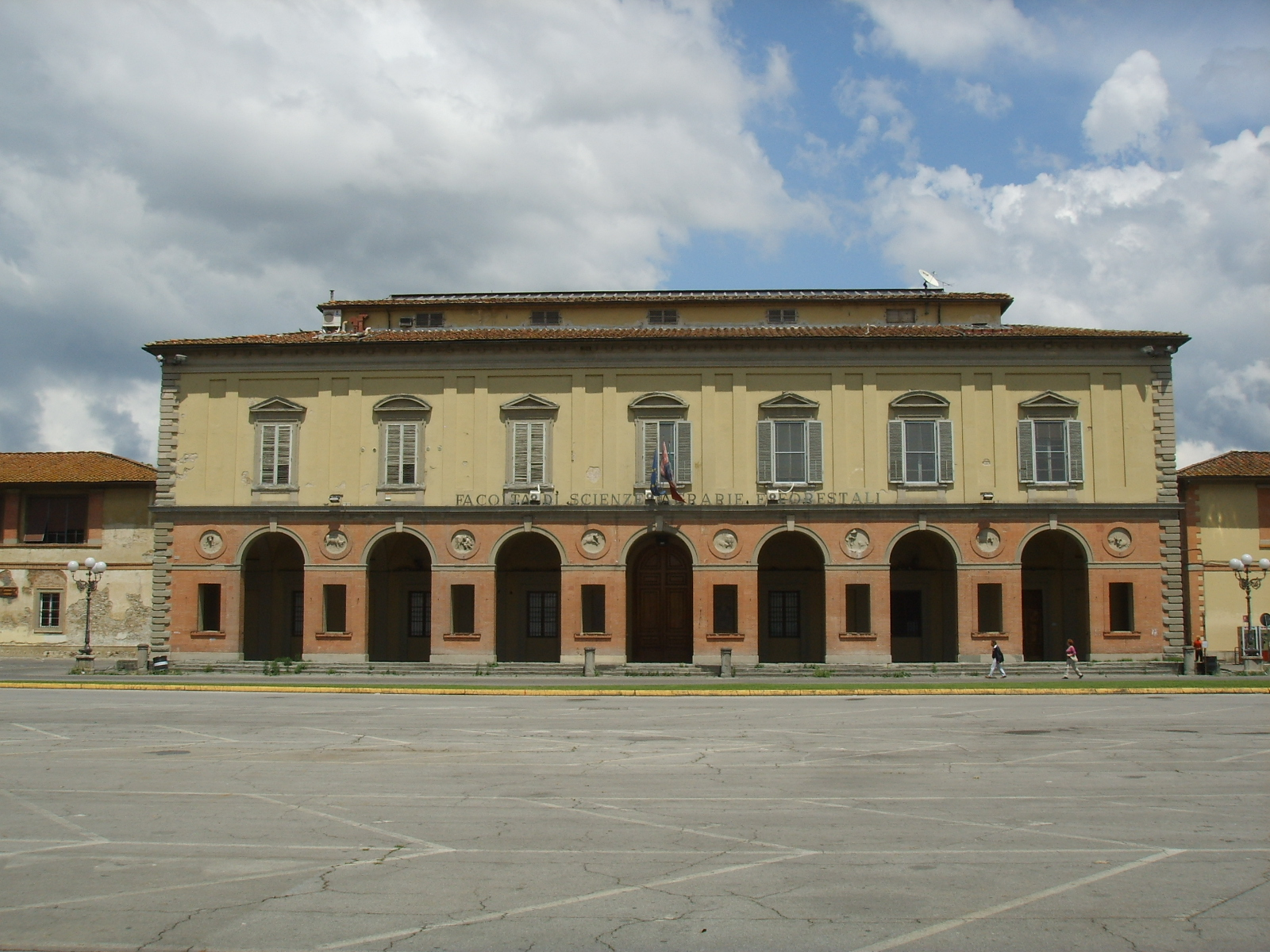
Facade of Palazzina

The Palazzina Reale delle Cascine (Royal Palace of the Cascine) is a small Neoclassical palace sited on the Piazzale delle Cascine within the public park (Parco delle Cascine) located along the north bank of the Arno river just north of central Florence, Italy. Built in the mid-18th century by the Grand Duke of Tuscany, in 2020 now houses part of the offices of the faculty of agricultural and forestry sciences of the University of Florence.

== History ==
The Grand Duke Peter Leopold of the House of Habsburg-Lorraine transformed the lands the former Medici rulers had used as a farm and hunting ground into a public park around 1765. At the site, he built this small palace, also described as a casino, which in its time described an often rural or semi-rural house for outdoor or garden jaunts or entertainment. Planning of the two-story structure was begun in 1785 by the artist and architect Gaspare Maria Paoletti, who was soon replaced by his young pupil Giuseppe Manetti. The road network around the building was designed by the architect Giuseppe Cacialli.

By the nineteenth century, the Florentine park management offices were housed in the Palazina, and a part was rented to the Italian-English Giacomo Thompson, who built an iron and glass roof in the courtyard behind the building, where he housed his Caffè Ristorante Doney.

After several transitions, the Palazzina was transformed into the Faculty of Agricultural and Forestry Sciences of the University of Florence in 1936.

== Description ==
The main façade of the building faces south over the Piazzale delle Cascine, gardens and a fountain toward the Arno river. Until the twentieth century, this area contained a series of buildings, impairing the vista of the river. The façade has a ground-story brick portico with seven arches, each flanked by bas-relief medallions, designed by Giuseppe Manetti, depicting activities related to the care and husbandry of cattle. On the second floor, seven gabled windows are framed by paired pilasters. Some rooms on the first floor are frescoed with mythological subjects, such as the Sala Pompeiana (frescoed by Giuseppe Sorbolini in 1789), the Sala delle Feste (decorated by Luigi Mulinelli), the Sala di Flora, the Sala di Bacchus and the Gallery (decorated by Giuseppe Castagnoli and Gaetano Gucci). In the Gallery, today the Aula Magna, has plaster statues, burnished to imitate bronze, depicting the Bacchae, sculpted by Luigi Acquisti.

The two side buildings were initially used as stables (on the lower floors) and barns (on the upper ones). On the back were the original houses of the peasants.

== Images ==
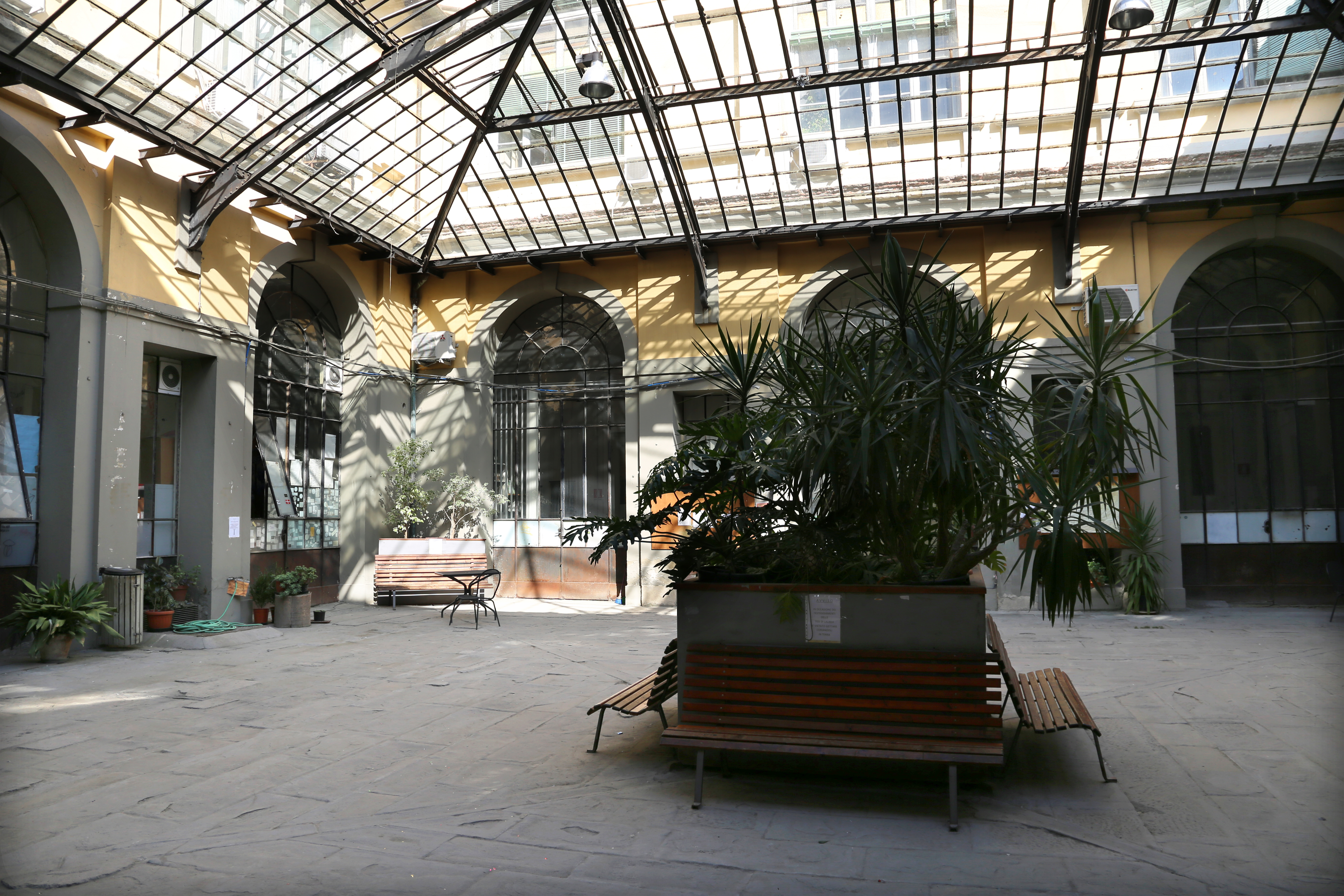
Roofed courtyard

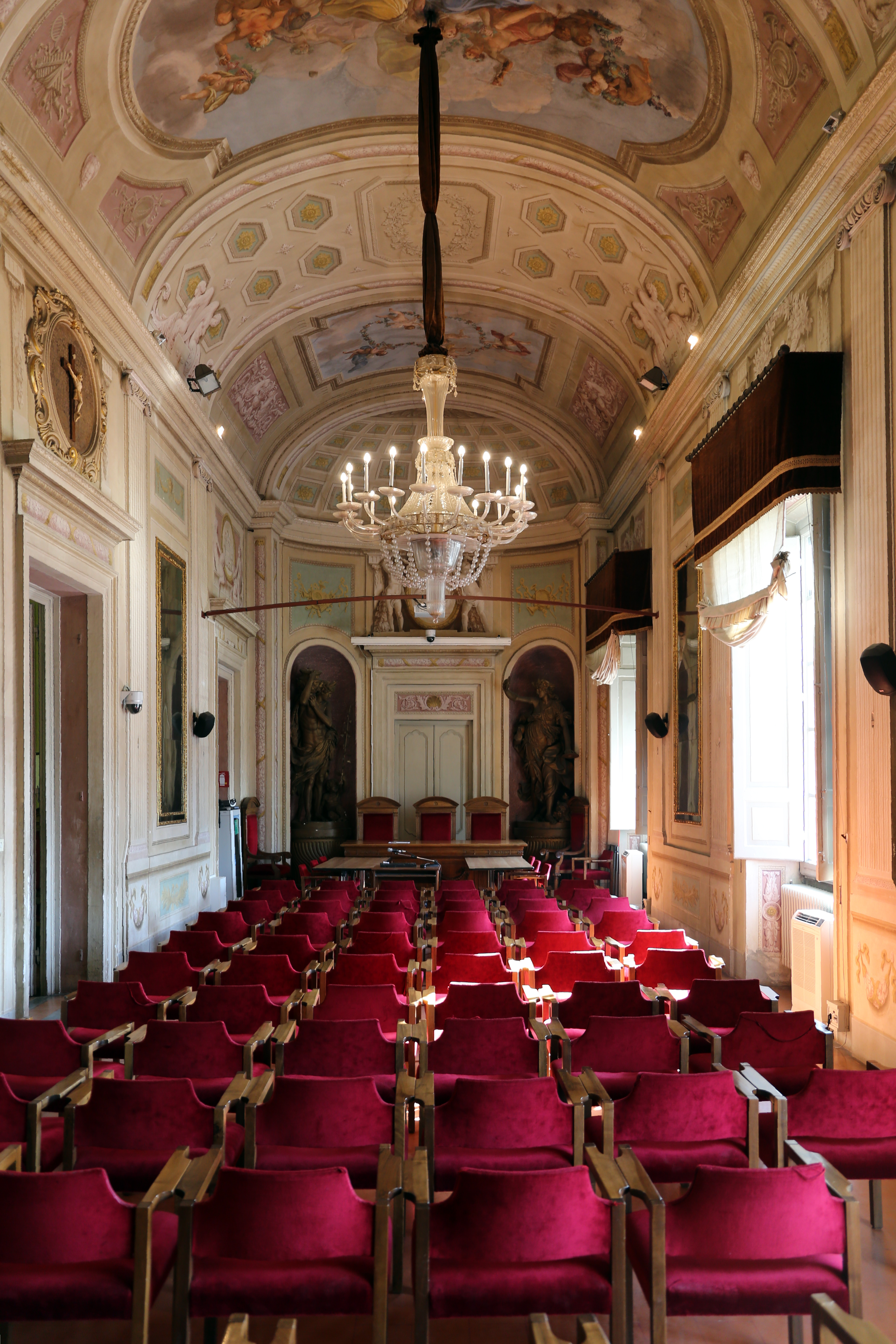
Aula Magna

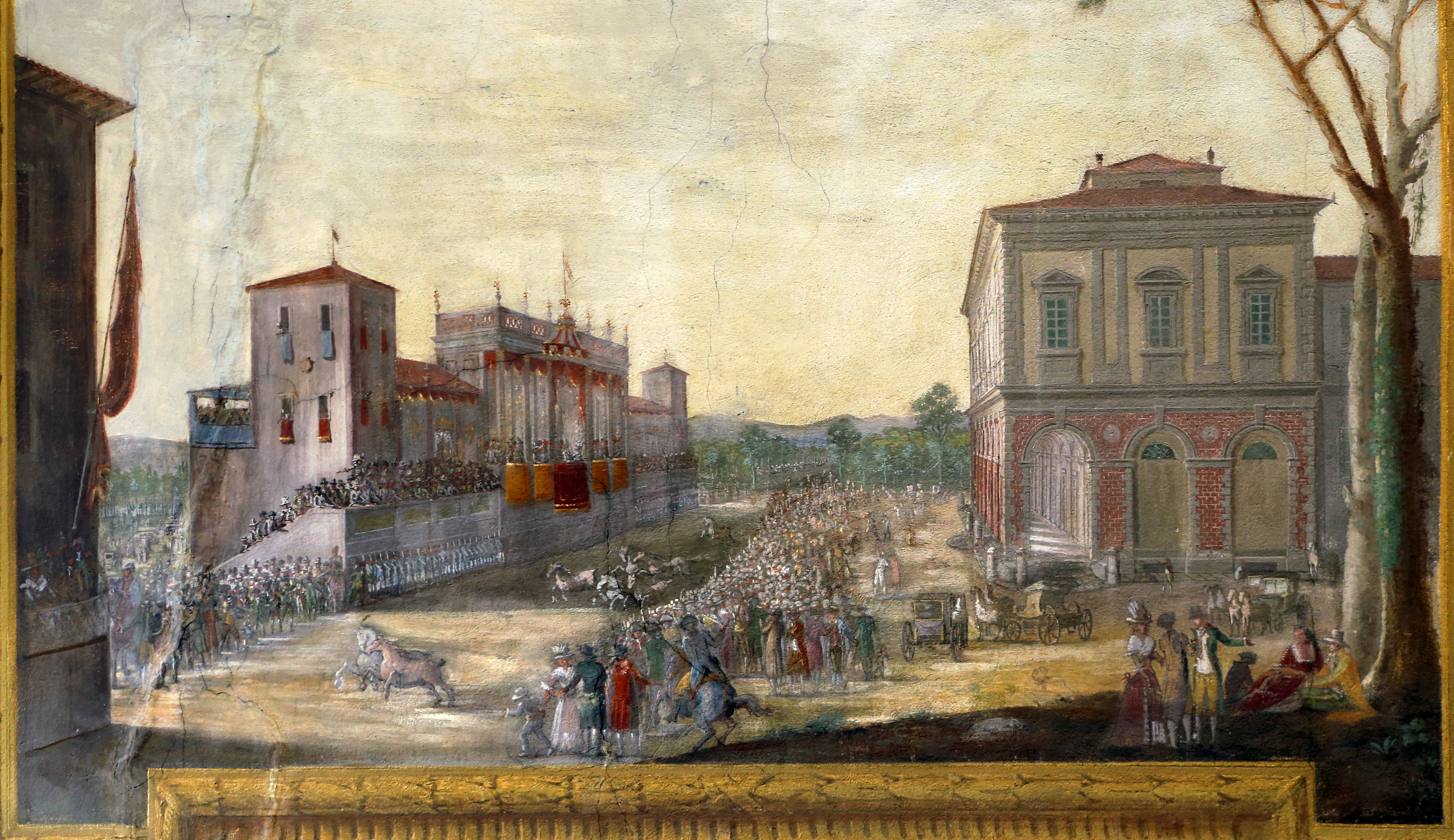
18th-century view of the Palazzina and surrounding buildings by Luigi Mulinelli, painted for the Salone delle Feste

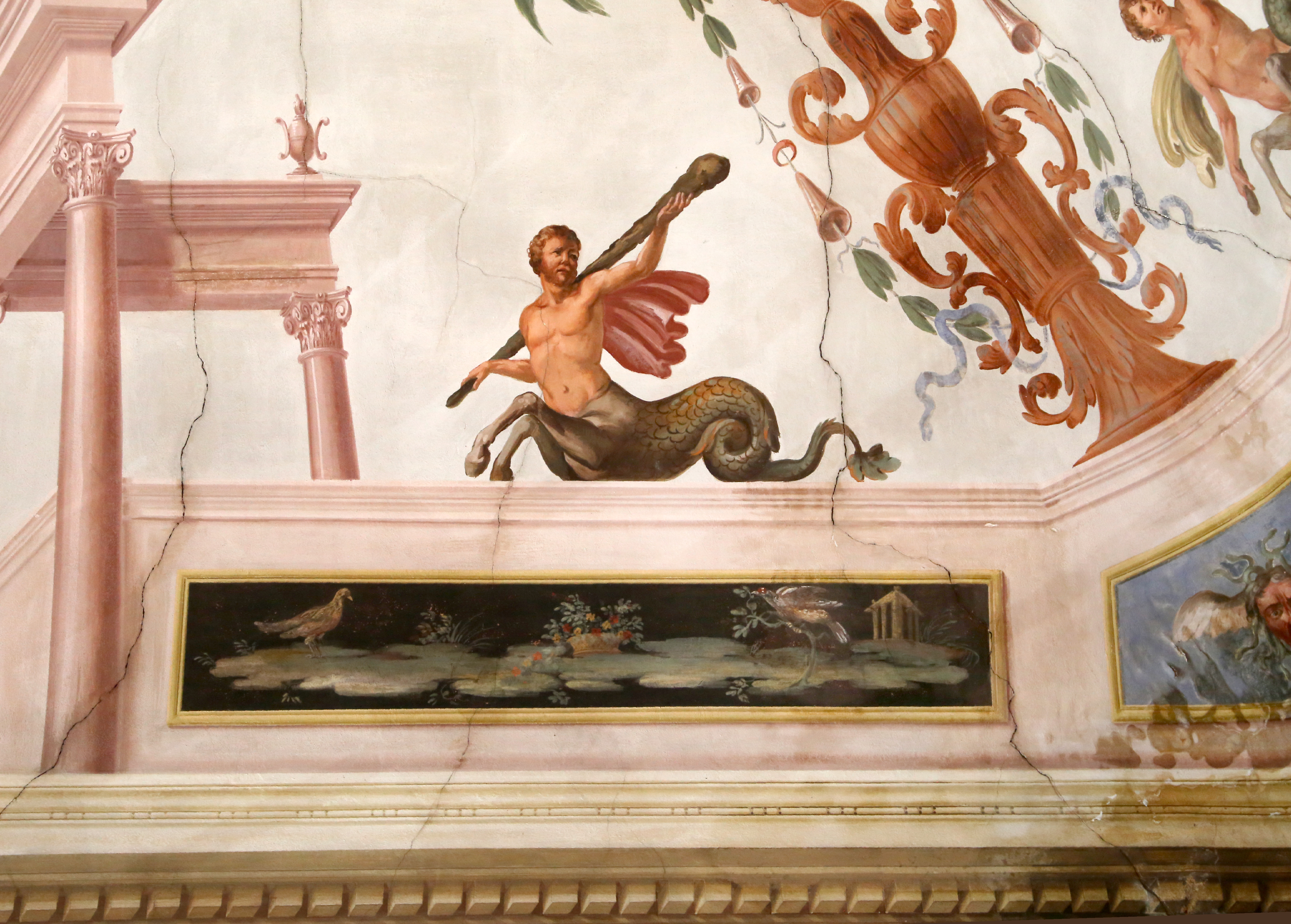
Frescoes by Giuseppe Sorbolini in sala Pompeiana

== Bibliography ==
- Sandra Carlini, Lara Mercanti, Giovanni Straffi, I Palazzi parte prima. Arte e storia degli edifici civili di Firenze, Alinea, Florence 2001.
- L.Zangheri (curated by), Alla scoperta della Toscana lorenese. L'architettura di Giuseppe e Alessandro Manetti e Carlo Reishammer, 1984, Florence.
