= Giuseppe Servolini =

Italian painter (1748–1834)

Giuseppe Servolini, also known as Sorbolini (1748–1834) was an Italian painter active mainly in Florence.

There are works by Servolini in the church of Santa Maria Maddalena dei Pazzi. He frescoed a Madonna, child, and St John the Baptist for the Oratory of the Confraternita Di San Niccolò Del Ceppo in Florence. He became a professor at the Accademia del Disegno in Florence in 1791. He painted a wooden crucifix for the church of Santa Felicita, Florence, He also frescoed the Pompeian rooms in the first floor of the Palazzina Reale delle Cascine in Florence. Along with the painter Giovanni Orlandini, he helped redecorate (repainting) the mosaic interior of the Baptistery of Florence in 1782.
