= Teatro Metastasio =

Theater in Prato, Italy

Coordinates: 43°52′47″N 11°05′58″E

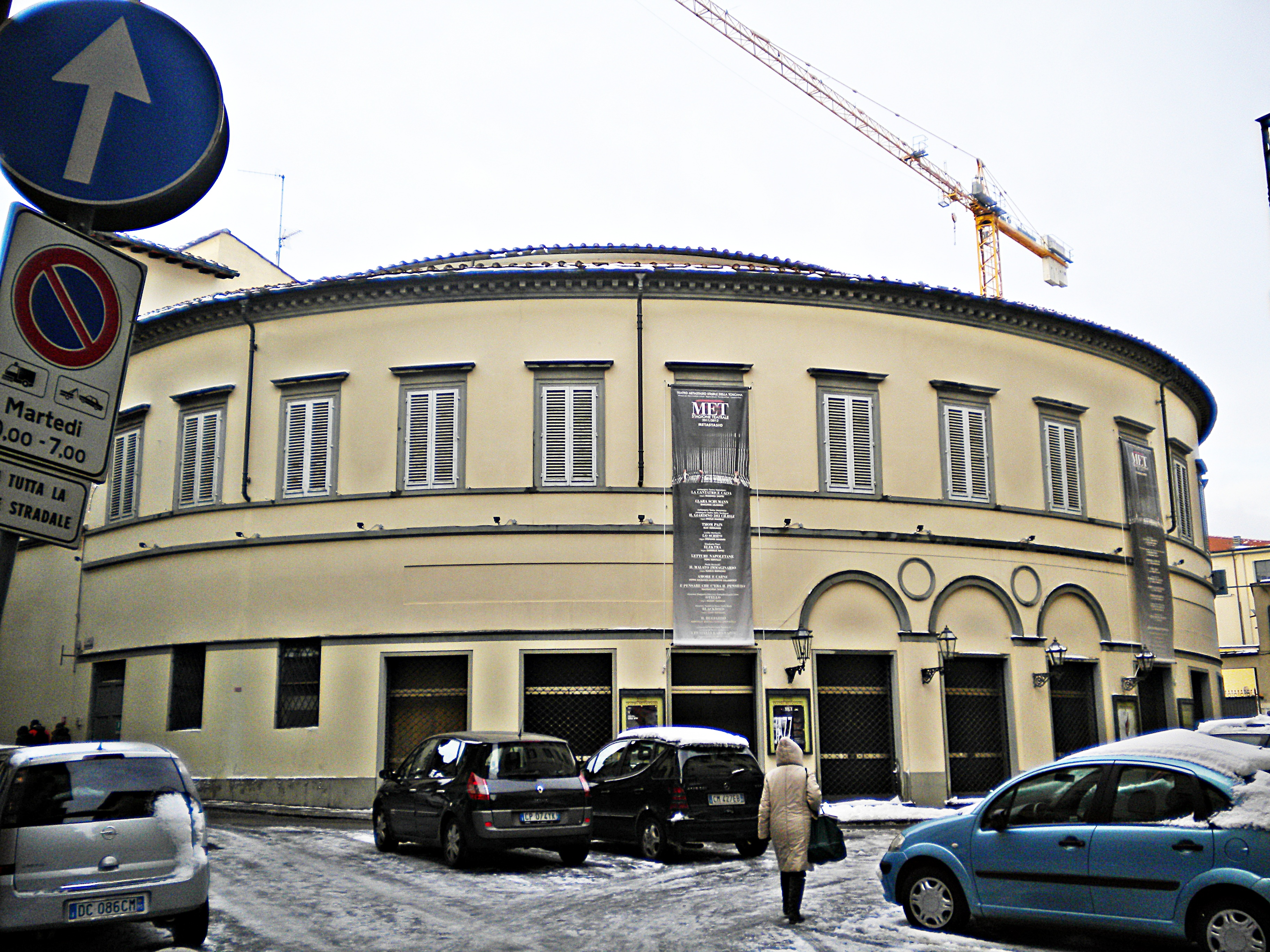
Convex entrance facade on Via Cairoli.

The Teatro Metastasio is a theatre located on Via Benedetto Cairoli in central Prato, Italy. It remains the city of Prato's main venue for opera, plays, and concerts.

The structure was commissioned by the local notary and director of the Royal Construction Offices of the Grand-Duchy, Benedetto Cecconi, as a public opera house to replace the Teatro dei Semplici in the town. The building was designed by architect Luigi de Cambray Digny, construction of the theatre began in March 1829. The inaugural performance of theatre was of Gioachino Rossini's Aureliano in Palmira on 8 October 1830.

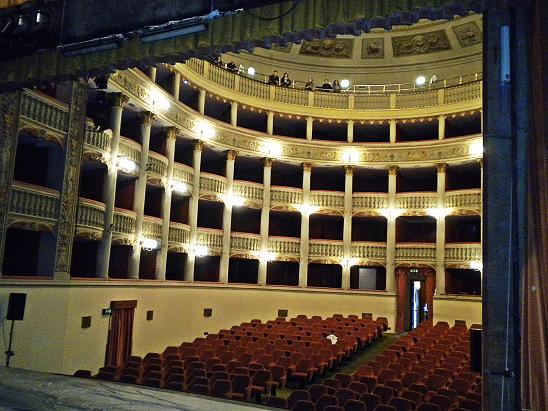
View of the hall from the stage

The painter Antonio Marini painted the sipario or theater curtain and the fresco on the vault of the seating hall. The ceiling frescoes were later removed during a renovation in 1867, where the seating interior was modified into a semicircular one, designed by architect Telemaco Bonaiuti, and for which a new entrance was built. In 1939 the theatre was purchased by the Municipality of Prato. The theater was damaged during the second World War. It closed from 1956 to 1964 for repairs. The theater is presently under management of the Fondazione Teatro Metastasio, part of an organization of public theaters in the Tuscan region.
