= Lorenzo Ginori Lisci =

Italian politician

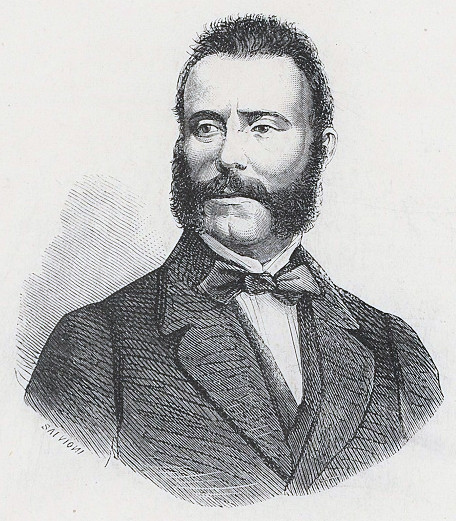

Lorenzo Ginori Lisci (23 May 1823 – 13 February 1878) was an Italian politician. Born in Florence, Grand Duchy of Tuscany, he was mayor of his hometown in 1869, when the city was already part of the Kingdom of Italy.

Preceded by Luigi Guglielmo Cambray-Digny	Mayor of Florence; 1869	Succeeded by Ubaldino Peruzzi
