= Luigi Guglielmo Cambray-Digny =

Italian politician

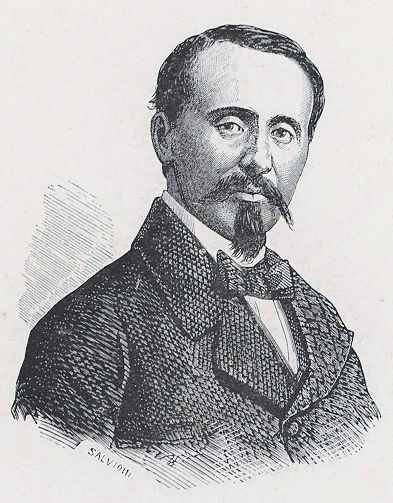
Luigi Guglielmo Cambray-Digny, 1861

Luigi Guglielmo Cambray-Digny (8 April 1820 – 11 December 1906) was an Italian politician. He was born in Florence, the son of the architect Luigi de Cambray Digny. He was the Mayor of Florence. He was also the Minister of Finance from 1867 to 1869 and a member of the Italian Senate from 1860. He was a recipient of the Order of Saints Maurice and Lazarus.

== See also ==
Preceded by Ferdinando Bartolommei (gonfaloniere)	Mayor of Florence; 1864–1867	Succeeded by Lorenzo Ginori Lisci
Preceded by Francesco Ferrara	Italian Minister of Finance; 1867–1869	Succeeded by Quintino Sella
