= Oratory of San Niccolò del Ceppo =

Church in Florence, Italy

Coordinates: 43°46′14.59″N 11°15′42.05″E

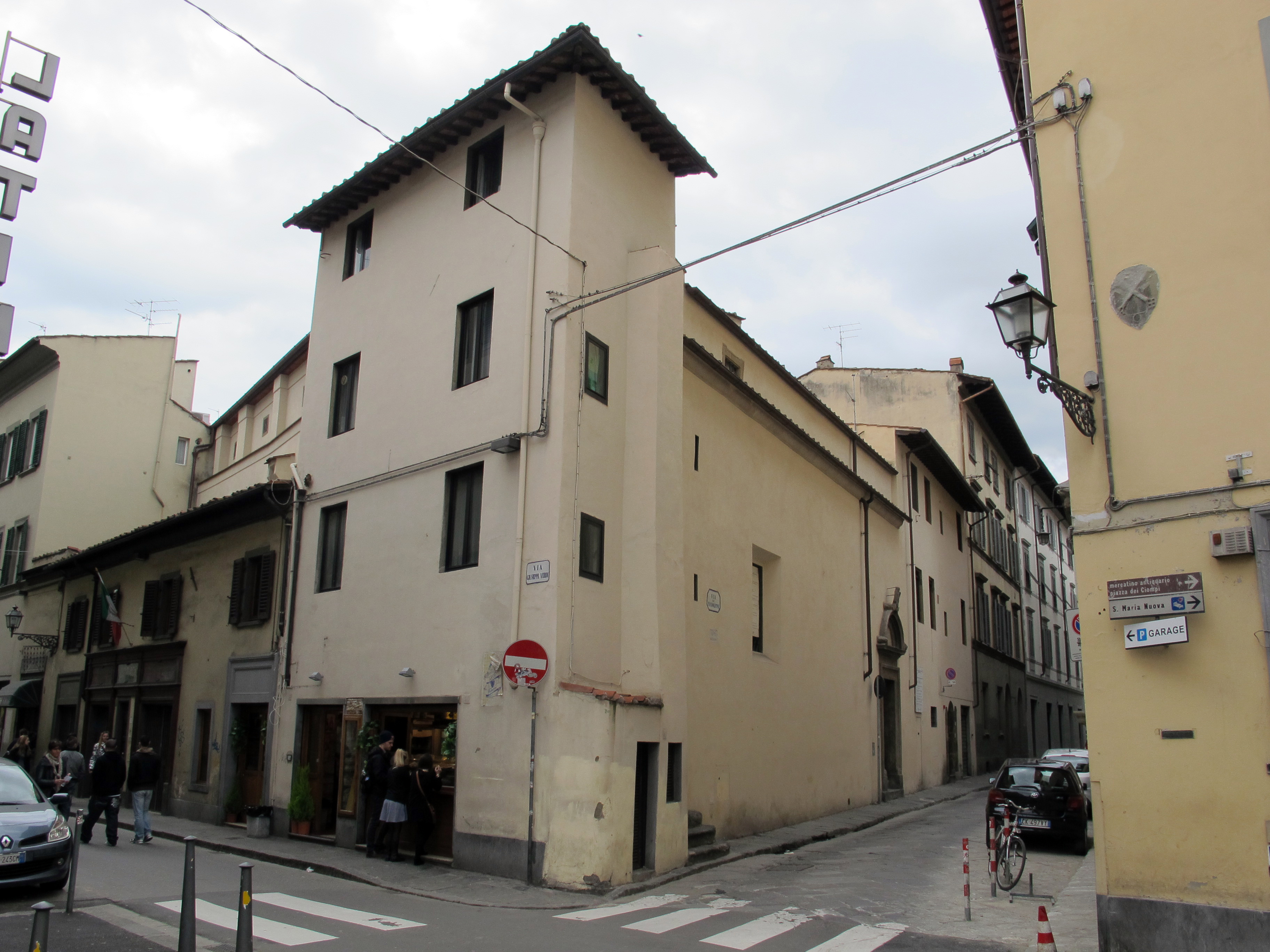
Exterior

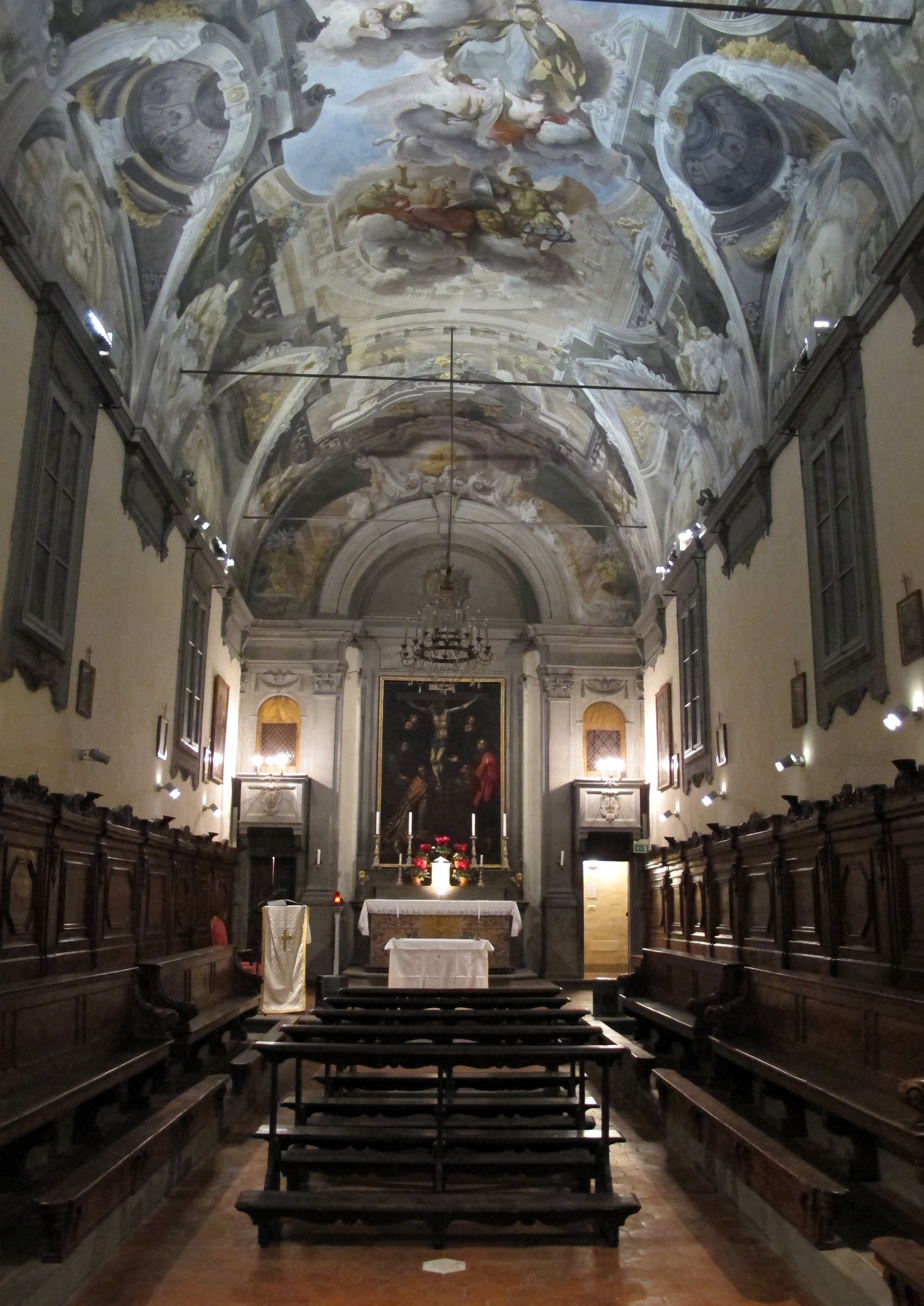
Interior with frescoed ceiling

The Oratory of San Niccolò del Ceppo is a Roman Catholic prayer hall located on via de' Pandolfini in Florence, region of Tuscany, Italy.

The oratory was established by the 13th-century Company of San Niccolò del Ceppo. The appellation ceppo derives from some tradition of putting an offering through a slot in a hollow tube. The religious company gained possession of this hall in 1561. The refurbishment continued until 1734.

The main altar has a fresco (1610) by Francesco Curradi, with flanking canvases by Giovanni Antonio Sogliani depict the Visitation. Previously a Crucifixion with Saints Nicola and Francis (circa 1430) painted by Fra Angelico stood here, but now in sacristy. Other frescoes are by Pieter de Witte and Giuseppe Servolini. The ceiling is frescoed with theLife of St Niccolò (1734) by Giovanni Domenico Ferretti.
