= Famedio, Pistoia =

Building in Italy

Coordinates: 43.935803°N 10.910228°E

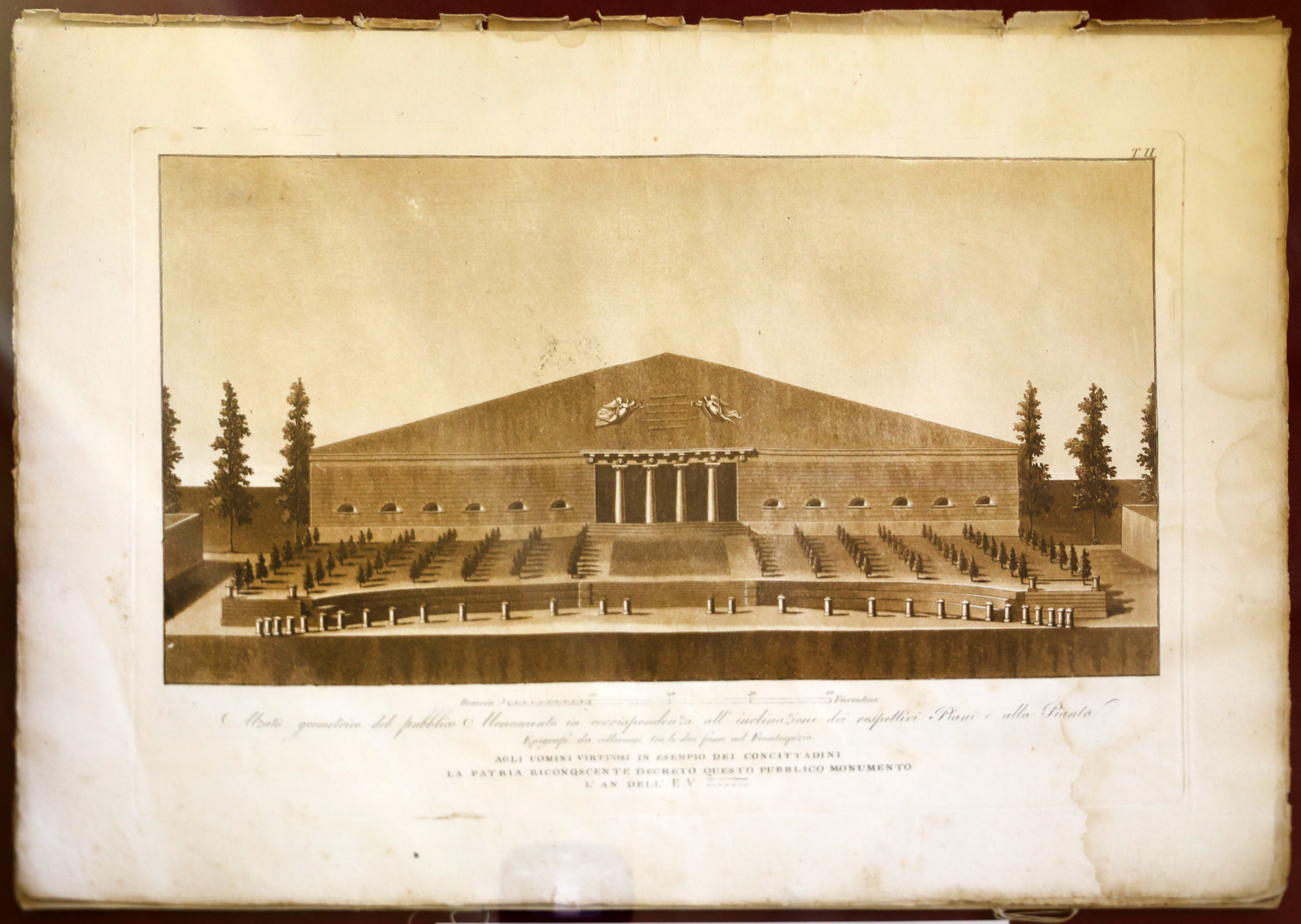
Original Plans for Pantheon

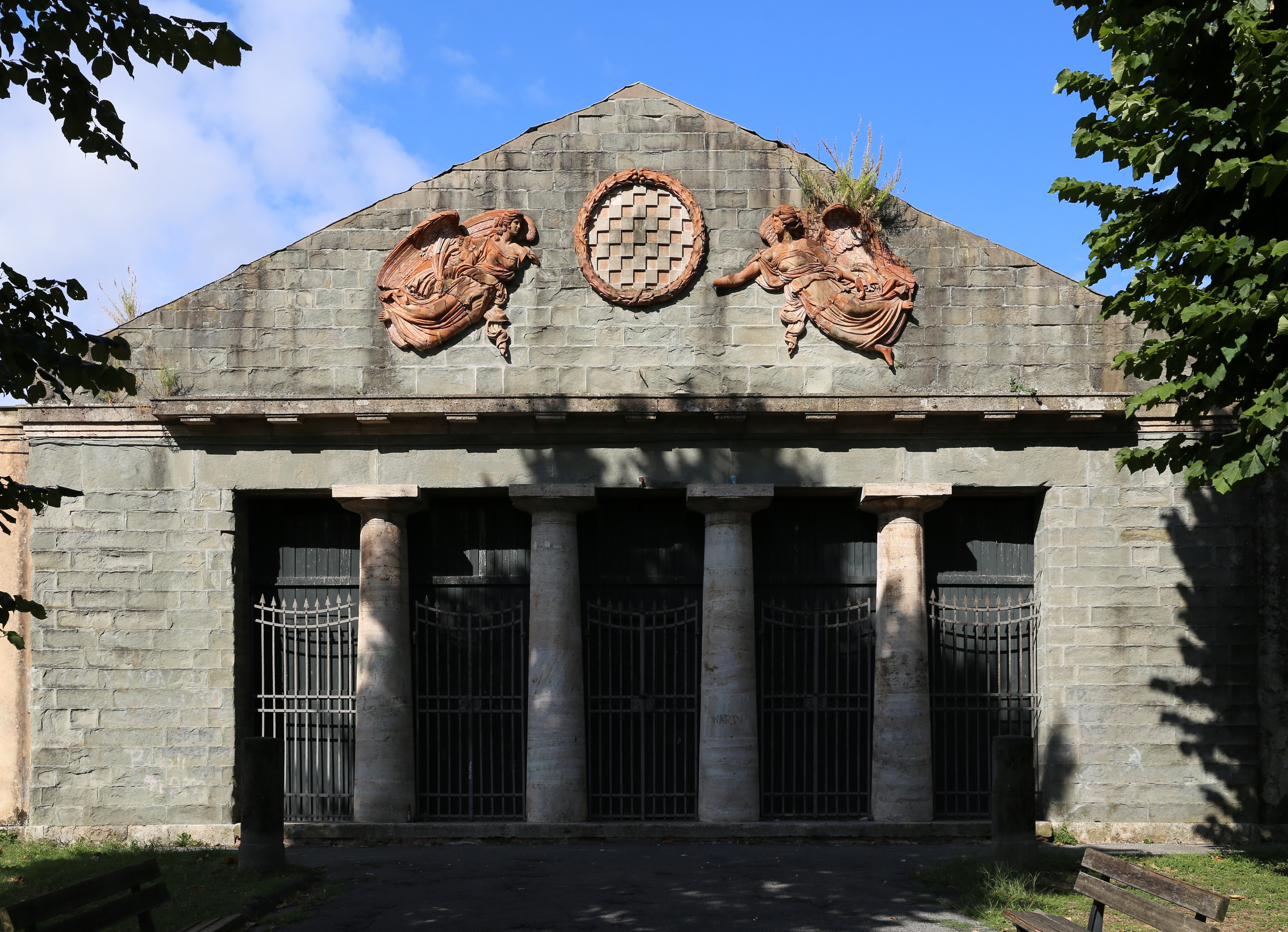
Completed Pantheon

The Famedio or Pantheon of Illustrious Men (Pantheon degli Uomini Illustri) is a Neoclassic-style shrine or temple located at the end of a tree lined path, just off Piazza San Francesco #9, in Pistoia, region of Tuscany, Italy. The shrine was envisioned in 1812 as a secular memorial to famous men of Pistoia.

== Description ==
The initial design was far grander, but the tumultuous events of the Napoleonic wars interrupted construction, such that it was not complete until the early 1820s in a much reduced scale. The design was by Cosimo Rossi Melocchi. The architecture has simple tapering Doric columns, that recall Egyptian temple columns, under rusticated temple facade with two angelic figures holding a central wreath around a checkered pattern, symbol of Pistoia. Melocchi would repeat his plans for a Pantheon in Villa Puccini a Scornio. For some years, the site was used as a cafe.
