= Cosimo Rossi Melocchi =

Italian neoclassical architect and printmaker (1758 – 1820)

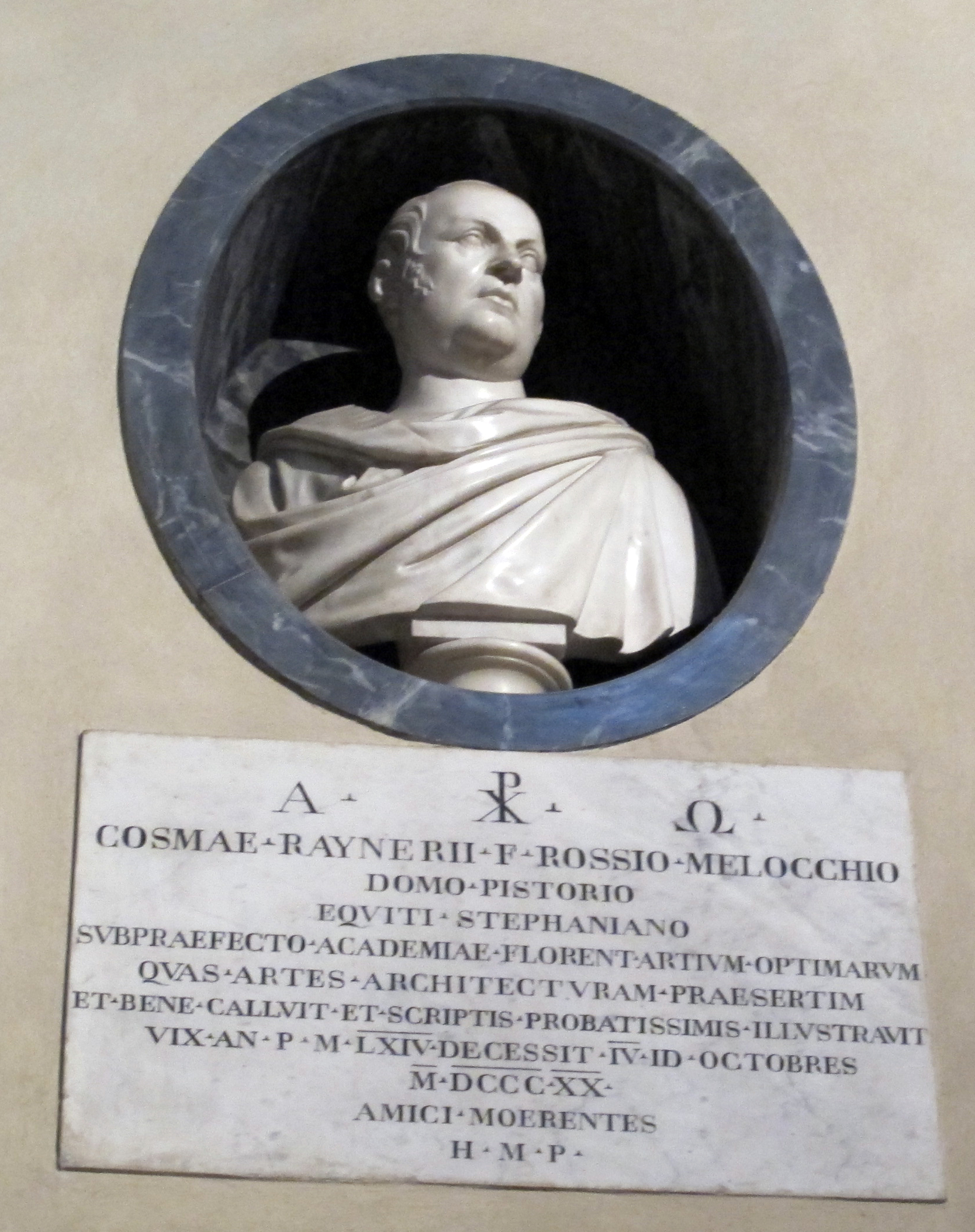
- Bust of Cosimo Rossi Melocchi, Santa Maria Novella, Florence
- Born: 10 August 1758; Pistoia, Grand Duchy of Tuscany
- Died: 12 November 1820 (aged 62); Florence, Grand Duchy of Tuscany
- Resting place: Santa Maria Novella
- Education: Gaspare Maria Paoletti
- Known for: Architecture
- Notable work: Famedio, Pistoia
- Movement: Neoclassicism

Cosimo Rossi Melocchi (10 August 1758 – 12 October 1820) was an Italian Neoclassical architect and printmaker.

== Biography ==
Born in Pistoia, where he initially obtained some training in design under Giuseppe Brizzi, he moved to Florence to study under Gaspare Maria Paoletti at the Academy of Fine Arts, and then spent two years in Rome studying art and architecture. He returned to Florence where in 1787, he was commissioned by the Russian Tsar (via his Tuscan minister the Conte Mocenigo), to create the ephemeral celebratory machines to celebrate the marriage of Maria Theresa of Austria, eldest daughter of then-Duke Peter Leopold of Tuscany, to Anthony, electoral prince of Saxony.

In Pistoia, he worked on the restoration of the Teatro dei Risvegliati and designed in 1812 the original, ambitious designs for the Famedio or Pantheon of illustrious men, completed in reduced form by 1827. He was knighted into the Tuscan Order of Saint Stephen. He helped design the Villa Puccini di Scornio, near Pistoia. With the ascension of Cavaliere Puccini as director of the Florentine Gallery, Rossi Melocchi was named as vice-president of the Academy of Fine Arts of Florence. Cosimo Rossi Melocchi died in Florence on 12 October 1820. He was buried in Santa Maria Novella.

== Writings ==
- Saggio teorico-pratico intorno alla determinazione dell'ombre nei diversi soggetti d'architettura geometrica. Florence: Giuseppe Tofani. 1805.

== Gallery ==
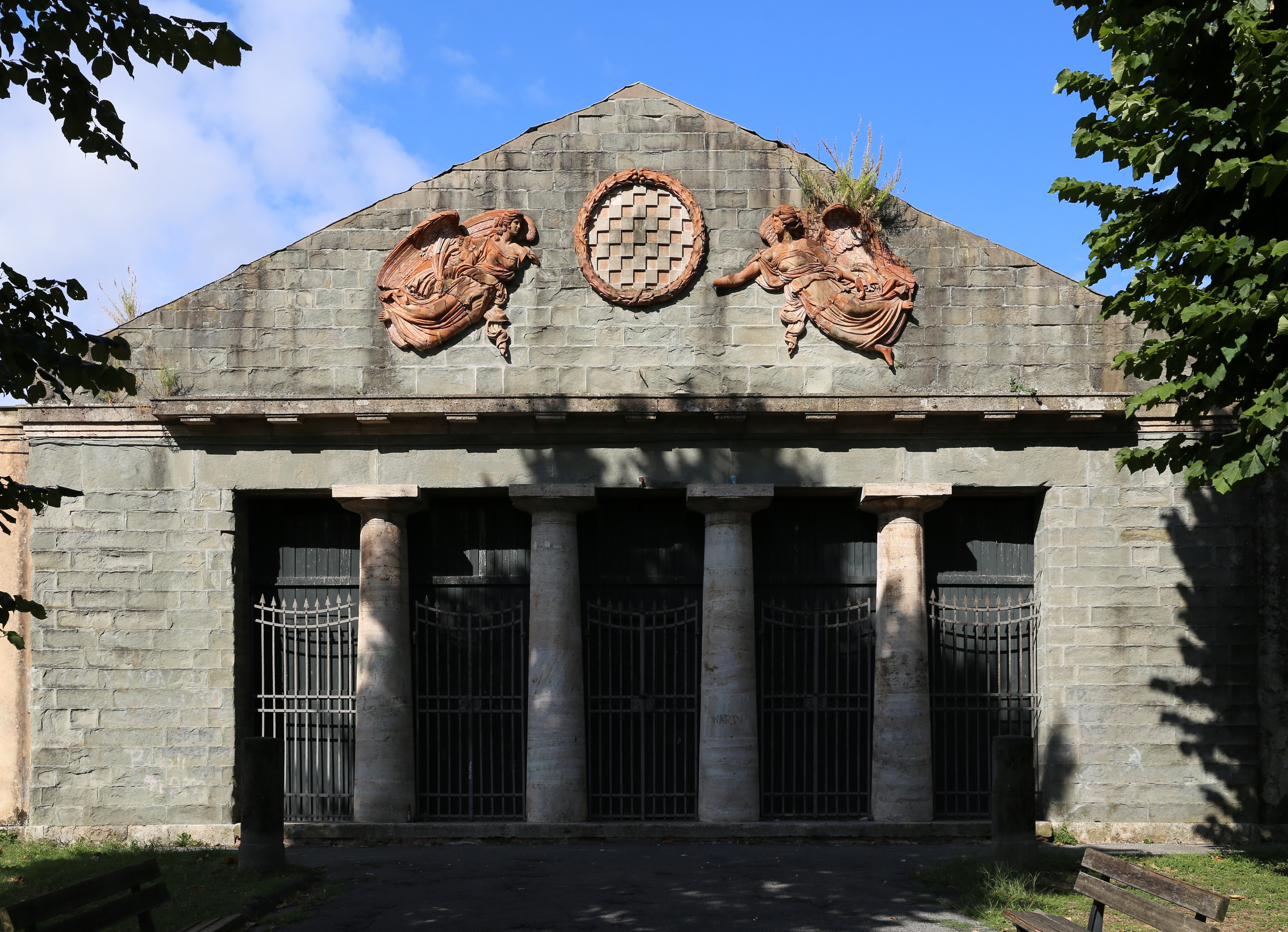
Famedio, Pistoia

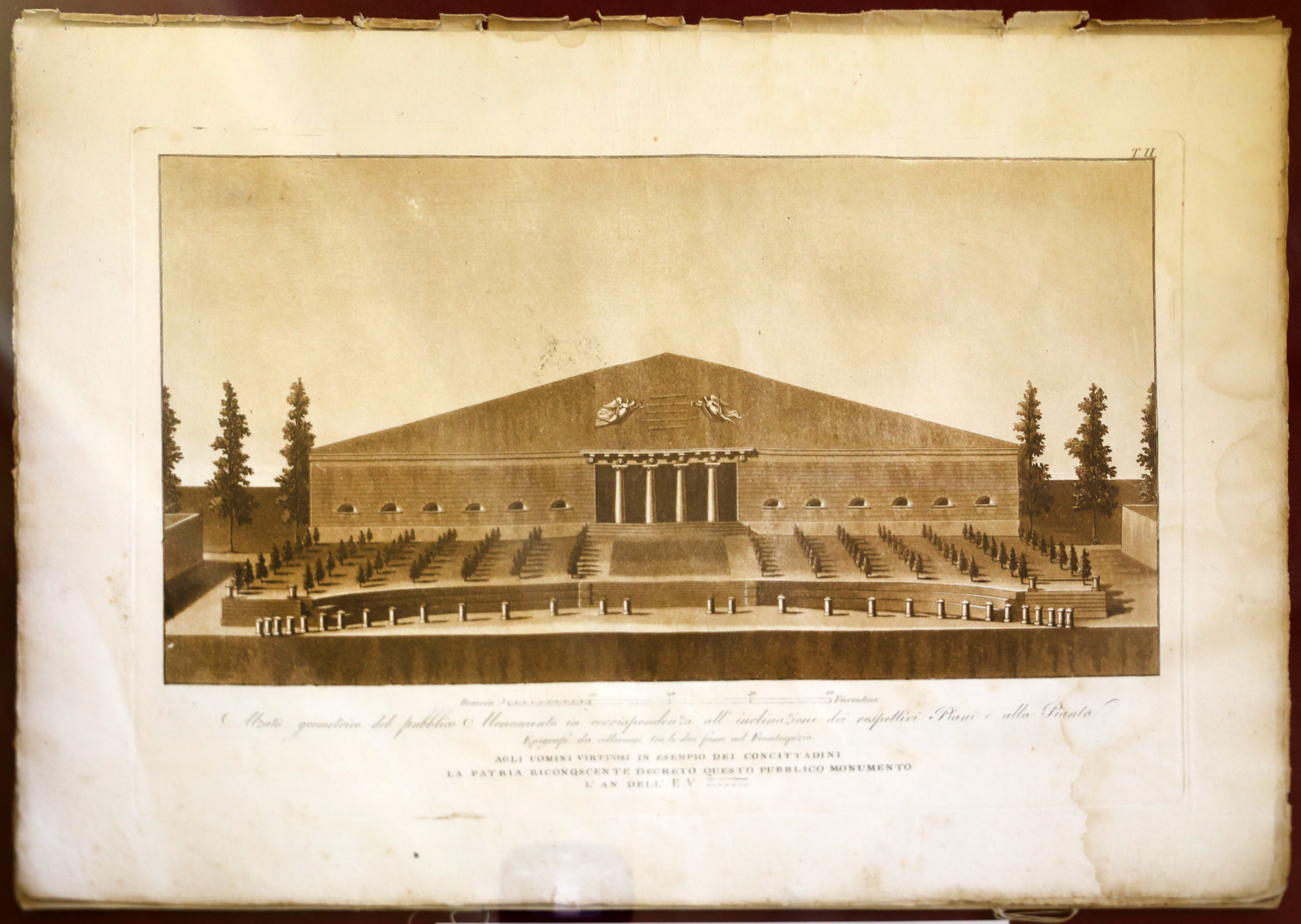
Original Plans for the Famedio

== Bibliography ==
- Tolomei, Francesco (1821). Guida di Pistoia per gli amanti delle belle arti. Pistoia: presso gli eredi Bracali. pp. 195–196.
- Ceccanti, Federico (2017). "ROSSI MELOCCHI, Cosimo". Dizionario Biografico degli Italiani (in Italian). Vol. 88: Robusti–Roverella. Rome: Istituto dell'Enciclopedia Italiana. ISBN 978-88-12-00032-6.
