= Giuseppe Castagnoli =

Italian painter

Giuseppe Castagnoli (1754–1832) was an Italian painter, mainly of quadratura and ornamentation.

Known to be active in Prato in Tuscany, he was appointed as a teacher of ornamentation for the Academy of Fine Arts of Florence, and published in Florence a book titled Le regole pratiche di prospettiva per i giovani figuristi. He helped paint frescoes for the Hall of Bacchus in the Palazzina Reale delle Cascine of Florence.
