= Gaspare Maria Paoletti =

Italian sculptor and architect

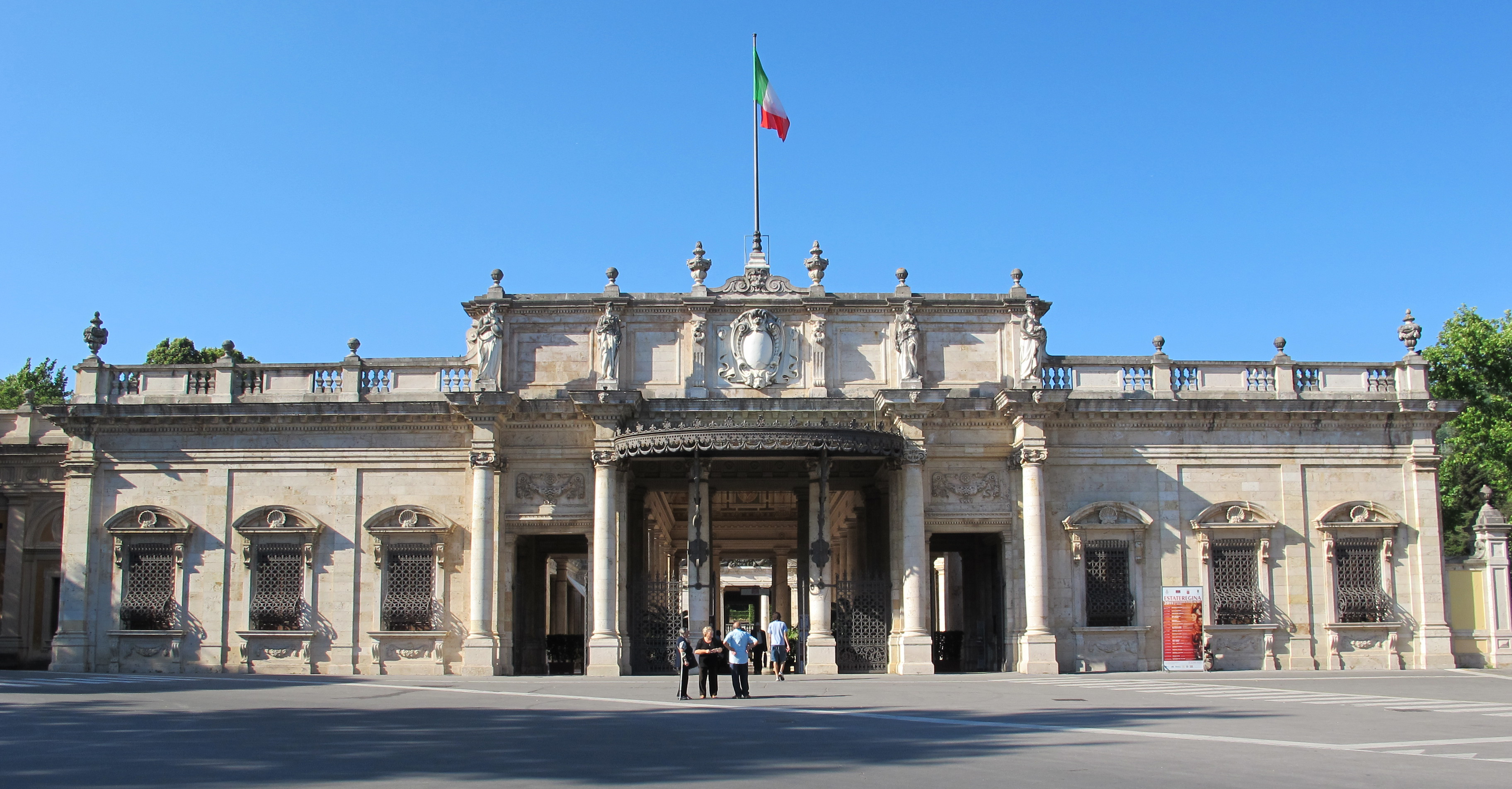
- Façade of the Terme del Tettuccio
- Born: 6 December 1727; Florence, Grand Duchy of Tuscany
- Died: 19 February 1813 (aged 85); Florence, First French Empire
- Known for: Architecture
- Movement: Neoclassicism

Gaspare Maria Paoletti (December 6, 1727 – February 19, 1813) was an Italian Neoclassical sculptor and architect, active mainly in his native Florence. Among his works are the Palazzina della Meridiana (1775), the White Hall (1776), and the Museum of La Specola, all attached to the Palazzo Pitti. He worked extensively at the Villa di Poggio Imperiale (1776-1783).

== Biography ==
=== Early life and education ===
Gaspare Maria Paoletti was born in Florence on December 6, 1727. He studied drawing with the sculptor Vincenzo Foggini (1692–1755) and then studied architecture under Bernardino Ciurini (1695–1752) and Ferdinando Ruggieri. Paoletti established a lasting association with Giuseppe Ruggieri, whom he assisted on a project for the baths (1744–62) at San Giuliano Terme, near Pisa. Close compositional affinities with the Palazzo della Misericordia at San Giuliano Terme (ashlar portico and quoins, small loggia at piano nobile level featuring a Serliana) identify the first work attributed to Paoletti, the Casino dei Nobili (c. 1750), Pisa.

=== Career ===
In 1761 he won the competition for the façade of the church of San Vincenzo dei Teatini, Modena, with a project inspired by the façade of San Giovannino dei Gesuiti (later degli Scolopi; 1579), Florence, by Bartolomeo Ammannati. Paoletti then went to Parma, which was at that time the centre of the dissemination of French architectural styles, and then visited Rome.

In 1766 Paoletti was officially appointed alongside Giuseppe Ruggieri as First Engineer to the Royal Works, thus assuming responsibility for the major projects of restoration, enlargement and changed use of crown buildings. The same year he was commissioned to enlarge the Villa del Poggio Imperiale in order to raise it to the pompous standards of an out-of-town European palace. He added two spacious courtyards to the 17th-century nucleus, stylistically unified by the application throughout of a compositional scheme derived from Palladio’s Palazzo Chiericati (1550–57) in Vicenza.

During the work on Poggio Imperiale, a difficult and innovative operation was carried out to preserve a fresco once believed to be by Cosimo Rosselli (now attributed to Cosimo Lotti), by removing the entire supporting wall. The interior decoration at Poggio Imperiale was executed (1766–c. 1782) in collaboration with Giocondo Albertolli and Grato Albertolli. Paoletti moved from Louis XV style for the rooms around the right-hand courtyard to a solemn Louis XVI style in the ballroom, articulated by coupled fluted pilasters supporting a rigid continuous trabeation.

This solution, similar to French town houses of the period, was repeated in the White Room (1776–83) of the Palazzo Pitti and in the Tribuna fitted out (1779–80) in the Galleria degli Uffizi to accommodate the sculptural Niobe Group.

From 1771 Paoletti worked on the 16th-century Palazzo Torrigiani in Florence, adapting it as the Gabinetto di Fisica e Storia Naturale. From 1772 he was employed on works for the baths at Montecatini Terme, near Pistoia. He designed the Terme Leopoldine, Bagno del Tettuccio, the Palazzina Reale, and the Locanda Maggiore. The buildings erected around the springs spread out into the countryside with a picturesque irregularity, each characterized by a different variant of the Doric order. Paoletti drew upon many sources for this project, which forms the clearest expression of his didactic approach to composition.

In 1776 he began work on the creation of the Palazzina della Meridiana in Florence. This was a neo-Palladian annexe to the Palazzo Pitti, extending towards the Boboli Gardens. In 1784 Paoletti began the conversion of the convent of San Matteo, in the Piazza San Marco, Florence, into the Accademia di Belle Arti. The erection of the obelisk in the centre of the Prato dell’Anfiteatro in the Boboli Gardens in 1789 ended a long series of projects in the gardens (the Prato della Meridiana, Giardino della Specola and Emiciclo delle Colonne).

=== Academic career ===
In 1785 Paoletti was appointed Professor of Architecture in the Accademia di Belle Arti. During his long teaching career, he continued his work of radically renewing Tuscan architecture, championing a critical classicism modelled on Palladio. Paoletti’s Palladian Revival helped Florentine architecture to overcome the limitations of Michelangelo’s anti-classical style and prepared the way for the Neoclassicism and historical eclecticism of which many of his pupils became protagonists. His teachings were also diffused by a manual published by his assistant Ottavio Vannini. Among his pupils were Giuseppe Manetti, Cosimo Rossi Melocchi, and Pasquale Poccianti.

== Gallery ==
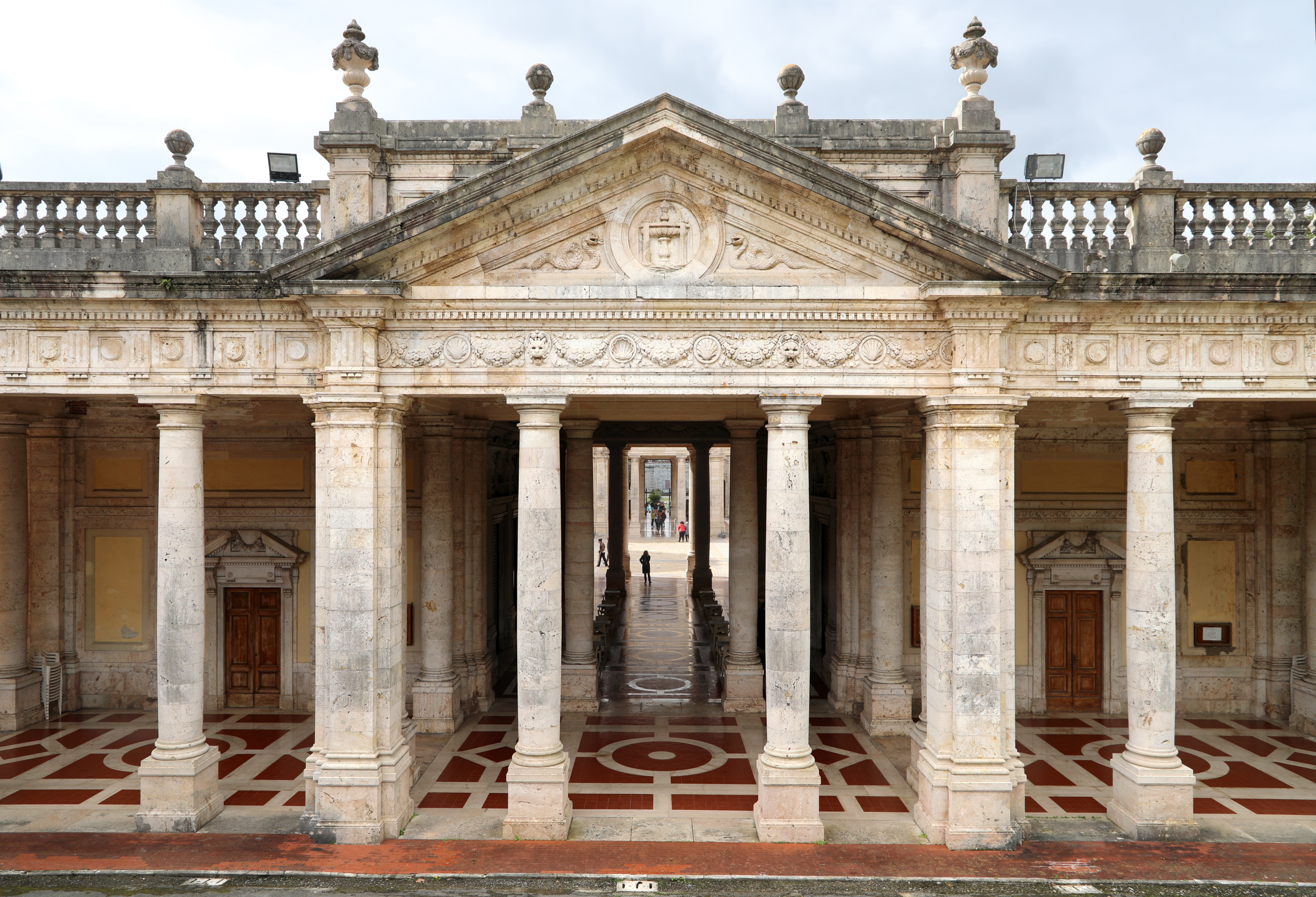
Back façade of the Terme Tettuccio, Montecatini Terme

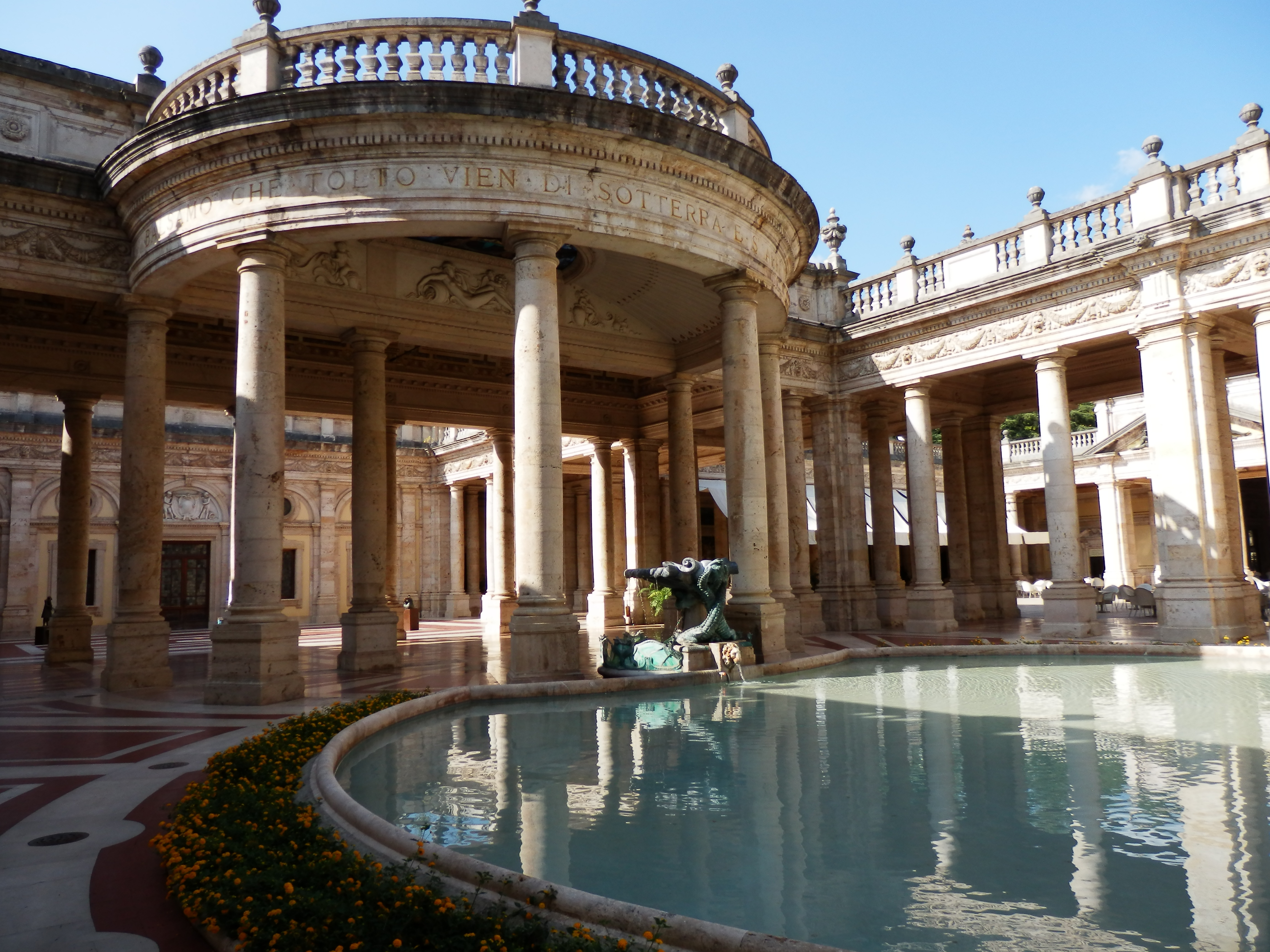
Exedra of the Terme Tettuccio, Montecatini Terme

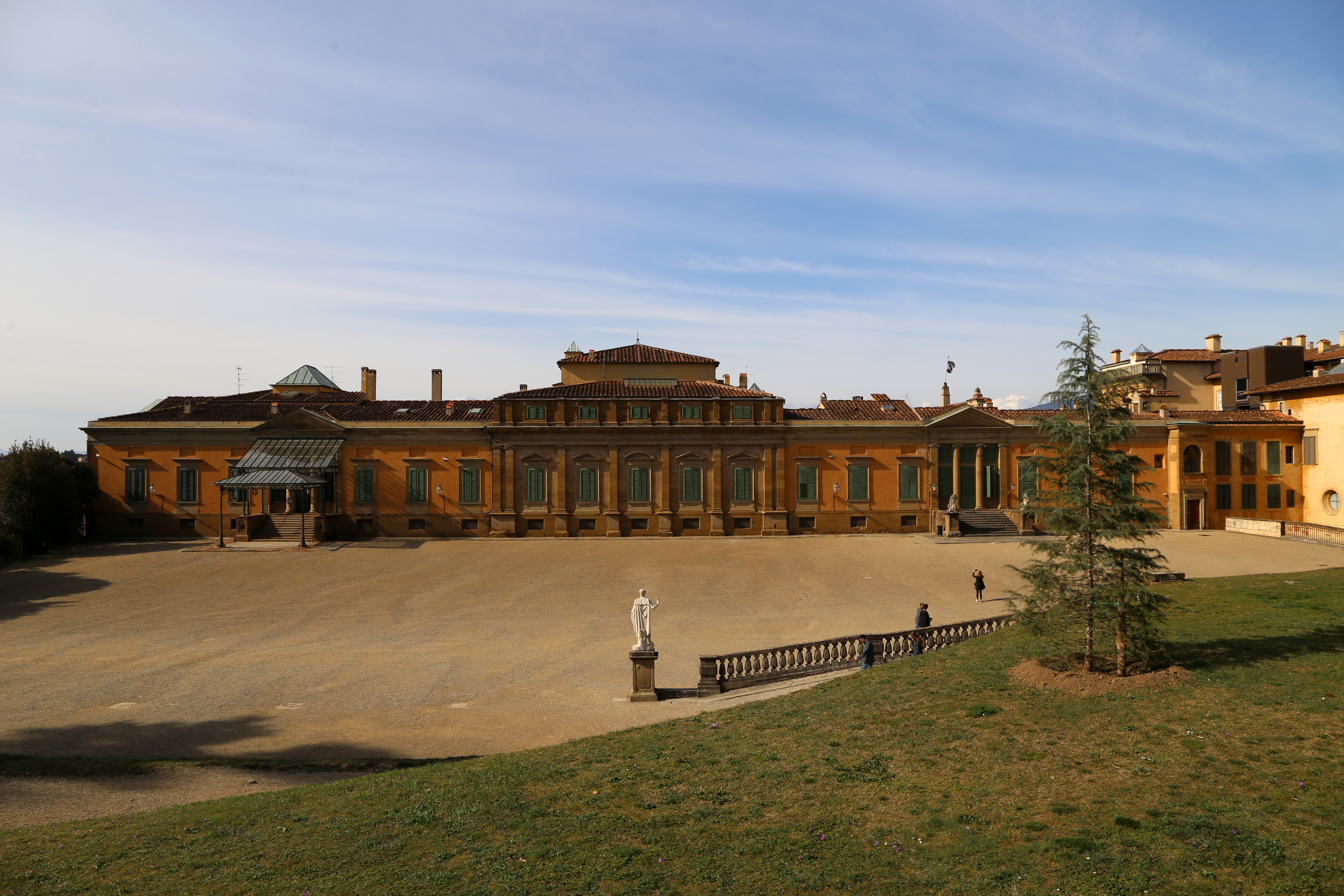
Palazzina della Meridiana, Pitti, Florence

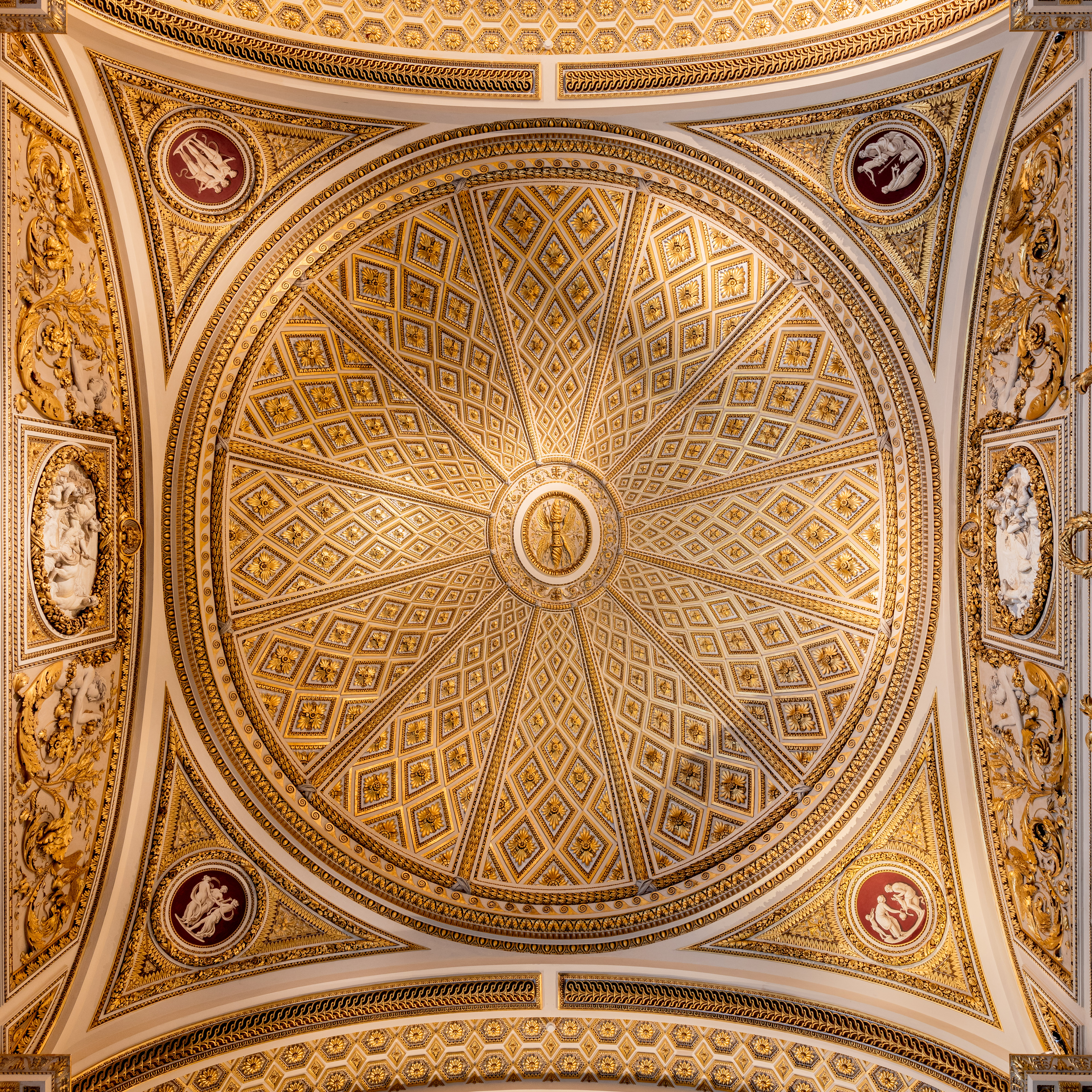
Dome of the Niobe room, Uffizi Gallery, Florence

== Bibliography ==
- Del Rosso, Giuseppe (1813). Memorie per servire alla vita di Niccolò Maria Gasparo Paoletti, architetto fiorentino. Florence: Niccolò Carli.
- Zangheri, Luigi (2014). "PAOLETTI, Niccolò Maria Gaspero". Dizionario Biografico degli Italiani (in Italian). Vol. 81: Pansini–Pazienza. Rome: Istituto dell'Enciclopedia Italiana. ISBN 978-88-12-00032-6.
