= Giuseppe Manetti =

Italian architect (1761–1817)

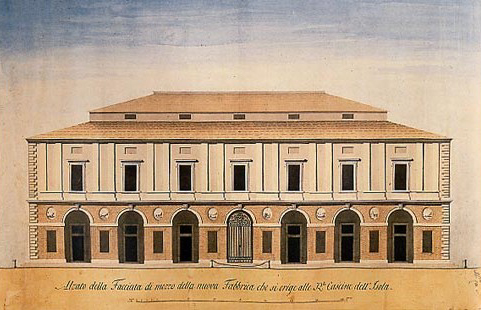
Plans for Palazzina Reale delle Cascine, 1787

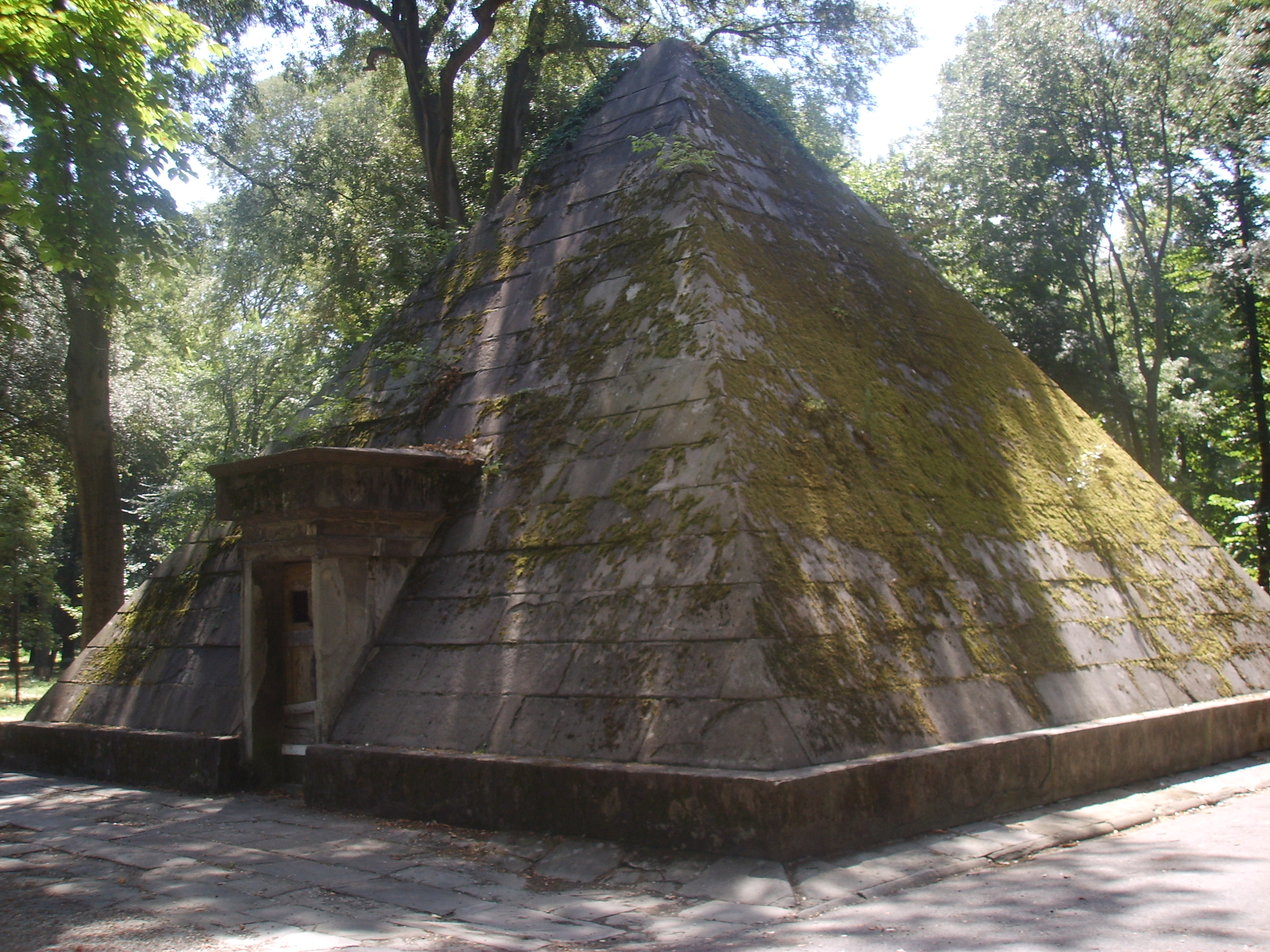
La ghiacciaia (1795) of the Parco delle Cascine

Giuseppe Manetti (16 November 1761 – 28 August 1817) was a Neoclassic style architect and landscape architect active in Tuscany. The same name is shared by an Italian violinist (1802–1858).

== Biography ==
He was born and died in Florence. He helped design the layout of gardens for villas belonging to the Grand-Dukes of Florence. Among his best known works are two structure in the two-story Parco delle Cascine in Florence, the Palazzina Reale delle Cascine and the ghiacciaia or ice-house. The latter is shaped like a pyramid. He also designed the Corsi Annalena gardens in Oltrarno.

== Bibliography ==
- Biographical entry in Sistema Informativo Unificato per le Soprintendenze Archivistiche (SIUSA)
