= Specola =

The term Specola in Italian means observatory, a location used for observing terrestrial or celestial events. A number of palaces, institutes, museums and observatories in Italy carry the name, because at one time or another they housed an observatory. Among these:

- La Specola - Natural history museum in Florence, Italy
- Palazzotto Specola in Pisa, now Domus Galileana
- Villa Specola di Lucca near Lucca, Tuscany
- Museo della Specola, Bologna
- Specola Vaticana (Vatican Observatory)
- La Specola, Padua - astronomical observatory in Padua
