= Villa Reale =

Villa Reale may refer to:

- Villa Reale in Monza
- Villa Belgiojoso Bonaparte, in Milan
- Villa Reale di Marlia in Capannori, Province of Lucca, Tuscany
