= Vincenzo Cappelletti =

Italian philosopher and historian (1930–2020)

Vincenzo Cappelletti (2 August 1930, in Rome – 21 May 2020, in Rome) was an Italian philosopher and historian of science. He taught at the University of Perugia, the Sapienza University of Rome, and the Roma Tre University. In 1957, he co-founded the magazine Il Veltro with Aldo Ferrabino. From 1970 to 1992, he was general director of the Treccani Institute. From 1970 to 2011, he was president of the Domus Galilaeana. He was made a Knight Grand Cross of the Order of Merit of the Italian Republic in 2001, and received honorary doctorates from the University of El Salvador and the University of Buenos Aires.

== Biography ==
After his classical high school studies, he graduated first in medicine then in philosophy. In 1967, he was awarded a professorship in the history of science, which, from 1968 to 1971, he taught, by appointment, at the University of Perugia, then, from 1972, at Sapienza University of Rome where, in 1980, he was awarded a full professorship; he then taught the same discipline at Roma Tre University until 2002, when he retired.

In 1956, he began working with Treccani, eventually becoming its deputy director general in 1969, then, the following year, director general, a position he would hold until 1992. This period would see a progressive affirmation both nationally and internationally of the institute, with a strong increase in the production of works as well as the opening of new and innovative publishing projects.

From 1992 to 2002, he was vice-president (a position shared with Roberto Pontremoli) and scientific director of the Treccani, a position held in the 1930s by Giovanni Gentile, then by Gaetano De Sanctis, then by Aldo Ferrabino, with whom Cappelletti was a collaborator in the 1950s. Former co-director of the history of science journal Physis (since 1991) and the Archives Internationales d'Histoire des Sciences, he directed, from 1956, Il Veltro.Publishing (which he founded with Aldo Ferrabino), as well as chairing the Studium publishing house. He was also a historical member of "Literary Tuesdays."

From 1970 to 2011, he was president of the Domus Galilaeana in Pisa and, from 1989 to 1997, of the Académie Internationale d'Histoire des Sciences. From 1999 he was president of the Italian Society for the History of Science (honorary president since 2011) and, from 1997 to 2010, of the Academic Institute of Rome. In addition, from 2001 to 2005, he was extraordinary commissioner of the Italian Institute of Germanic Studies, then president from 2006 to 2011, promoting its transition from a cultural institution to a research body. He also chaired the European Cultural Society since 1988, between the 1980s and 1990s the Italian Center for Sexology (CIS), the "C. Collodi" National Foundation since 1989, the BAICR-Sistema Cultura Consortium (Libraries and Archives Cultural Institutes of Rome) since 1991, and the FUCI Foundation from 1996 to 2011.

His scholarly activity initially concerned the History and Epistemology of the sciences Biology in nineteenth-century Germany, then Psychoanalysis theories, particularly Sigmund Freud and analytical psychology, in their relations with other social-humanistic disciplines, including anthropology,Politics and Philosophy. He also edited collectanea on aspects of the thought as well as the works of some eighteenth- and nineteenth-century scientists, including Giovanni Battista Morgagni, Emil du Bois-Reymond, Rudolf Virchow, Hermann Helmholtz. Then, after further investigating the Historiography and Methodology aspects of exact sciences and Natural science, his research interests turned toward the Philosophy of science and the Sociology of sciences, analyzing, from both historiographic and epistemological perspectives, the historical-dialectical relations between Science and Society, with a special focus on Social science.
