= Aqueduct of Nottolini, Lucca =

Aqueduct in Tuscany, Italy

The Aqueduct of Nottolini is an aqueduct near the city of Lucca in Tuscany, Italy. It was built in the 19th century to provide Lucca with water from the mountains south of the city. Its Neoclassical architecture design features a stone channel supported by more than 400 arches, stretching for over 3 kilometres (1.9 mi). The aqueduct is bisected by the A11, which runs from Florence to Pisa.

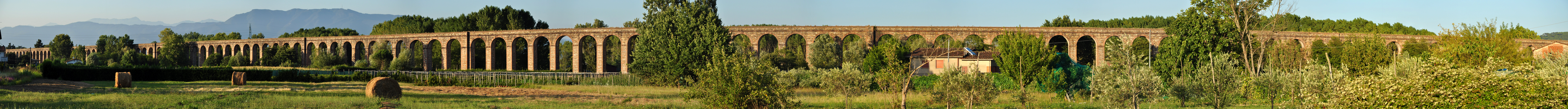
Aqueduct

== Construction ==
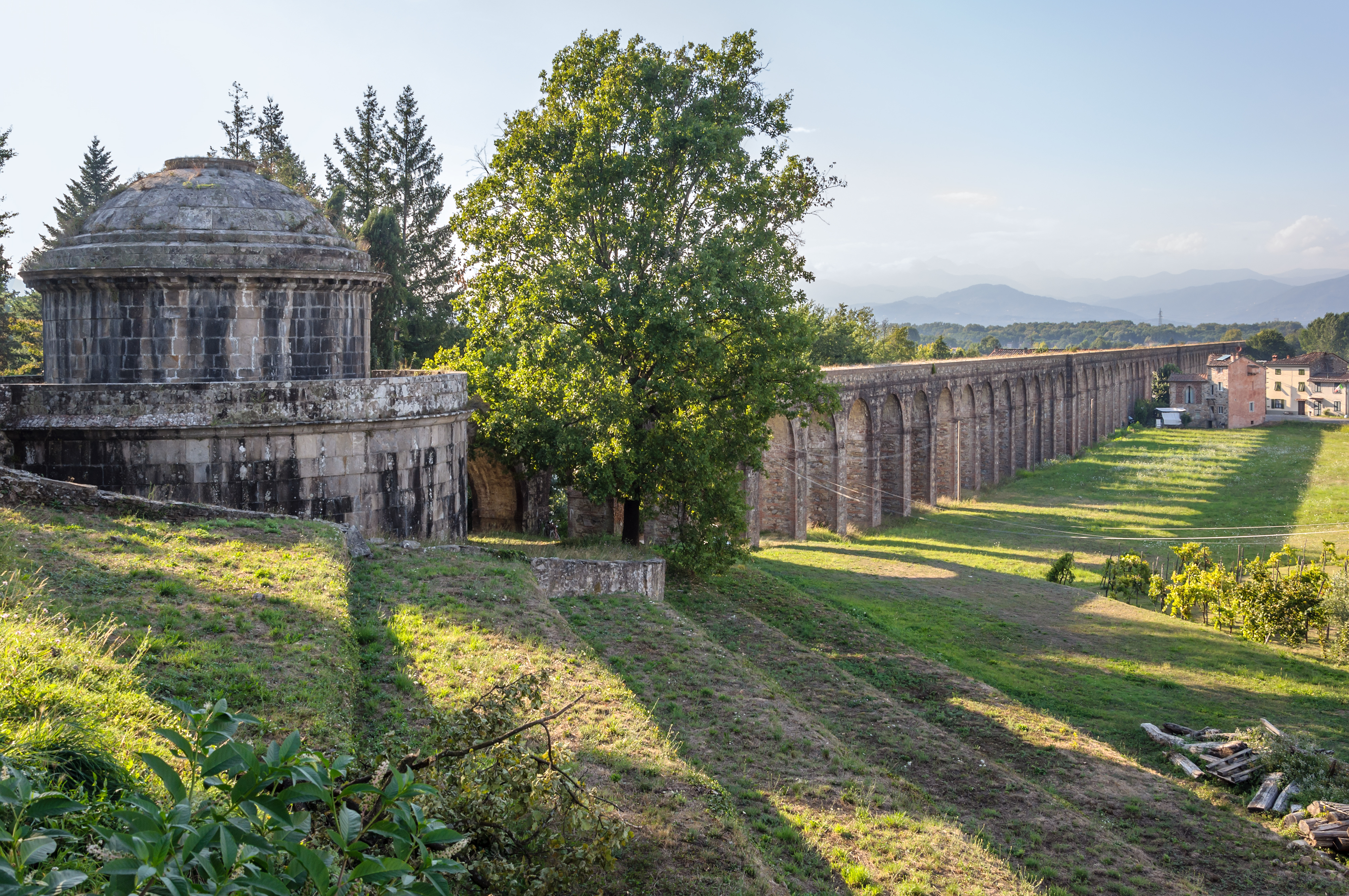
Temple cistern of Guamo and first arches

While the arches of the aqueduct are often confused as being those of an ancient Roman aqueduct, construction of the aqueduct was begun in 1823 by the architect Lorenzo Nottolini, under the rule of Maria Luisa of Spain, Duchess of Lucca, and continued until 1851. In the slopes of Monte di Vorno, a number of springs were conveyed through rocky channels to a domed circular stone temple-cistern (43°48′27″N 10°31′15″E) located near San Quirico in the frazione of Guamo.

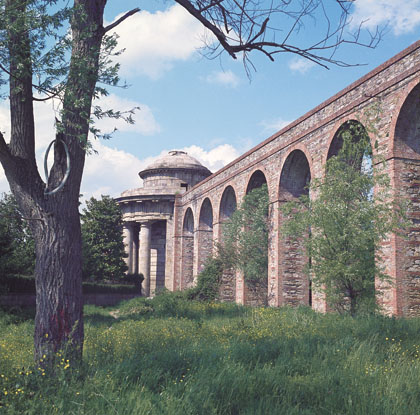
Aqueduct and temple-tank of San Concordio

The water was then conveyed northward through covered stone conduits to the temple-tank of San Concordio (43°50′09″N 10°30′32″E), just outside the fortified walls of Lucca. The arches were mainly built with brick.

From the San Concordio tank, potable water was led by metal pipes into fountains in the city, starting with the circular fountain in Piazza Antelminelli next to Lucca Cathedral.

When inaugurated, the flow of water was governed completely by gravity. The final iron conduits allowed for expansion and contraction of the metal. The interruption of the aqueduct occurred when the autostrada was constructed by Benito Mussolini's government in 1928–1932.

== See also ==
- Neoclassical architecture in Tuscany
