= Lorenzo Nottolini =

Italian architect and engineer

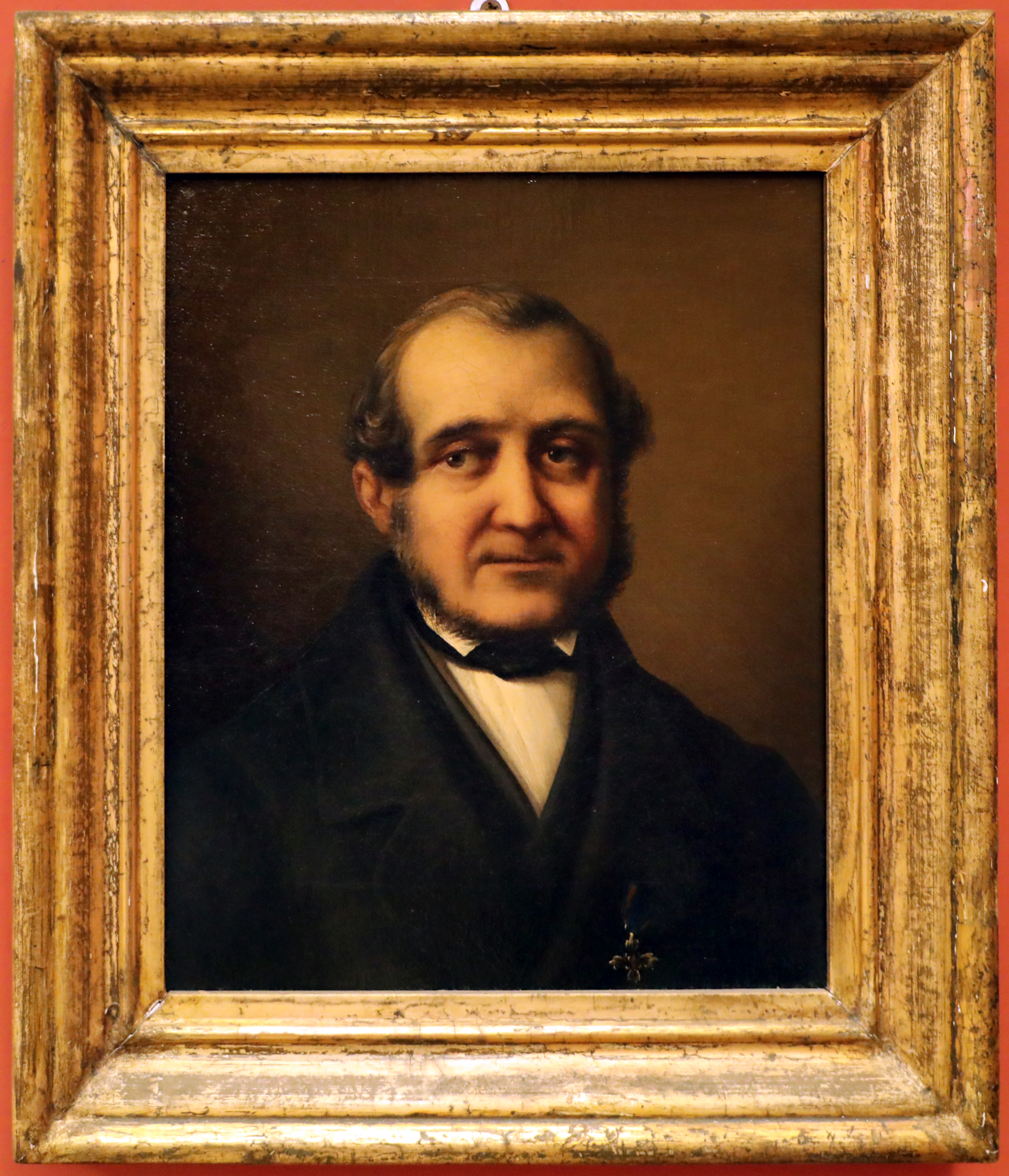
- Portrait of Lorenzo Nottolini by Lionello de Nobili
- Born: 6 May 1787; Capannori, Republic of Lucca
- Died: 12 September 1851 (aged 64); Lucca, Grand Duchy of Tuscany
- Occupations: Architect; Engineer
- Movement: Neoclassicism
- Buildings: Nottolini aqueduct; Specola di Lucca; Ponte delle Catene

Lorenzo Nottolini (May 6, 1787 – September 12, 1851) was an architect and engineer of the Neoclassic style in Lucca, Italy. He is famous for the Nottolini aqueduct and the urban refurbishment of the site known as the Piazza Anfiteatro.

== Biography ==
=== Early life and education ===
He was born at Segromigno in Monte, Capannori, but lived and mainly worked in Lucca. All of his siblings were educated in the same seminary, where three out of five brothers became priests and his sister became a nun. He began his architectural training in Lucca under Giovanni Lazzarini (1769–1834), an architect working for the Duchess of Lucca, Elisa Baciocchi, sister of Napoleon Bonaparte. Under the patronage of Elisa Bonaparte, he continued his studies at the Accademia di Belle Arti di Firenze (1811–13), for three months at the Accademia Clementina in Bologna under Giovanni Antonio Antolini, and, from 1813, at the Accademia di Belle Arti and the Accademia di San Luca in Rome as a pupil of Giuseppe Valadier and Louis-Martin Berthault. Nottolini's only works in Rome were the restorations of the churches of Sant'Eusebio and San Clemente and the Palazzo Maria Luisa, via della Gatta.

=== Duchy of Lucca ===
Returning to Lucca in 1818, he was appointed Court Architect and Engineer to the Principality of Lucca and Piombino and placed in charge of the numerous public works begun by Elisa Bonaparte and continued under Maria Luisa, Duchess of Lucca. Nottolini's activities in Lucca ranged from civic improvements and the renovation and design of buildings to major engineering works. In 1818 he began the remodelling of the existing 16th- and 17th-century city walls and the enlargement of the Ducal Palace, adding a vaulting entrance, a grand staircase and a Galleria delle Statue (the Palazzina in the north courtyard was built later, in 1834).

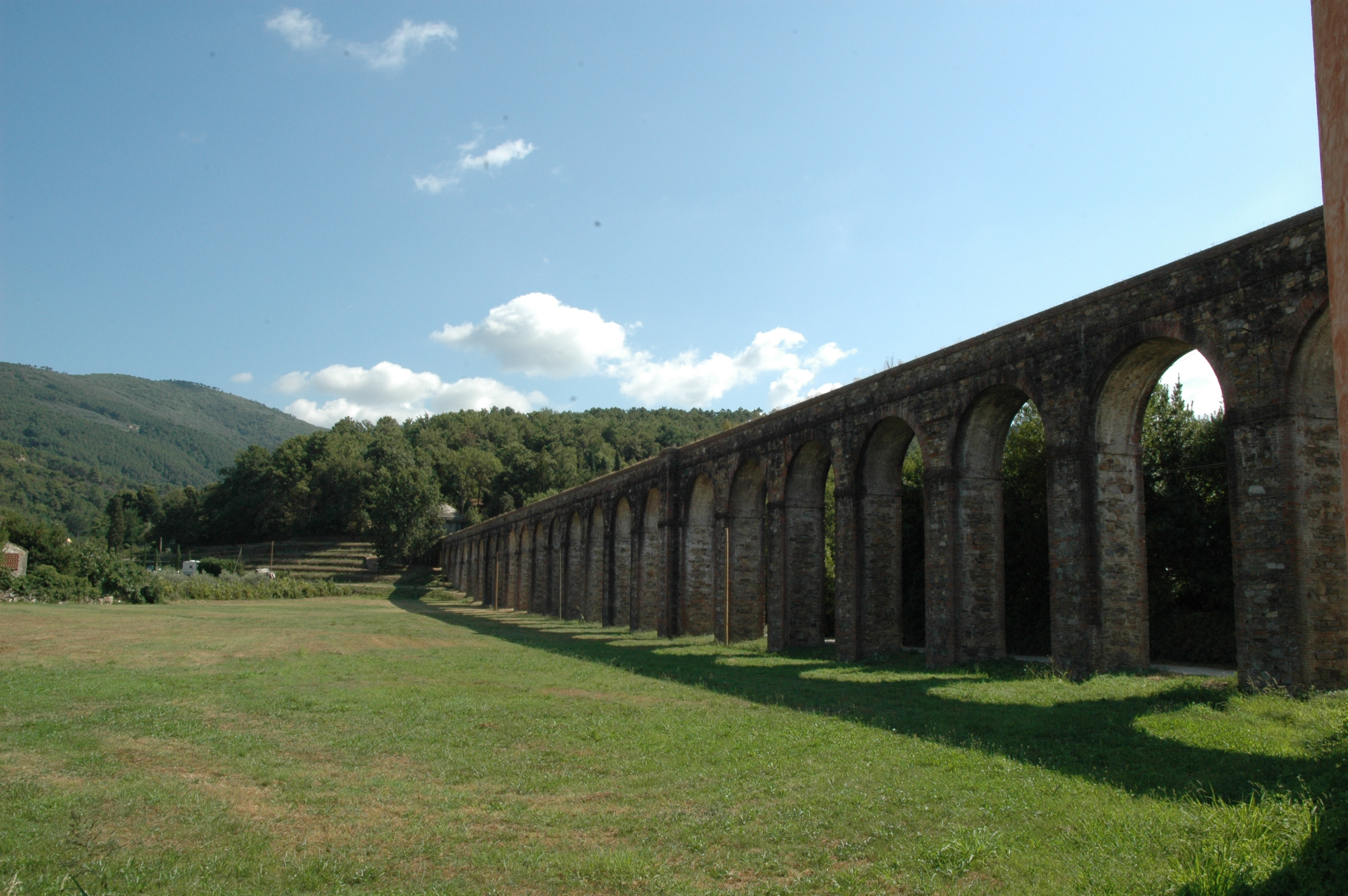
Aqueduct of Nottolini, Lucca

In 1819 he designed the Villa Marlia, near Lucca, of which only the Observatory (Specola di Lucca) and the Rotonda were built; the Observatory was neo-Palladian, with a tetrastyle portico. The Cappella Orsetti (1822) at the Monumental Cemetery of Lucca, was also Palladian in style, inspired by the Tempietto at Maser of c. 1579. Nottolini's principal work, however, was the organization of the water system of the Luccan plain and the supply to the city, and this occupied him for the rest of his life. Water from various springs was collected and led via canals and an aqueduct (1822–33) to the city walls; Nottolini terminated each end of the arched structure with a circular domed temple with a baseless Doric order, which acted as conduit. Within the city, Nottolini built several new fountains attached to the conduit, including one in the Piazza San Salvatore in the form of a pedestal with a statue and another in the Piazza Antelminelli (1832–5) that was a round basin with a vertical spout.

In 1833 Nottolini went to Berlin to obtain technical advice on the aqueduct; on his return, he executed a Gothic Revival design for a church at Marlia. In 1839 he visited England to investigate iron bridge construction, and he subsequently built the Ponte delle Catene (1839), a suspension bridge over the River Lima at Fornoli, near Lucca, which for Italy at that time represented a considerable functional and structural innovation; he used triumphal arches to act as functional supports for the suspension chains of the bridge. In these years Nottolini was involved in the urban renewal of Lucca. He cleared out the Piazza dell'Anfiteatro (1830–1839) and also designed the Hunting Lodge of Duke Charles II of Parma in the hamlet of Pieve Santo Stefano.

=== Grand Duchy of Tuscany ===
On the cession to Tuscany of Lucca by the Duke of Parma in 1847, Nottolini was invited to work in Florence, the new capital, but he preferred to remain in his native city. He was involved in part of what is described as the Great Project of Tuscany, wherein a number of marshes and swamps were drained to create arable land. In Lucca, the Lake of Bientina or Lake of Sesto were partially drained. The project also involved the architects and engineers from Florence: Leonardo Ximenes, Vittorio Fossombroni and Antonio Manetti. Nottolini died in Lucca on September 12, 1851.

== Gallery ==
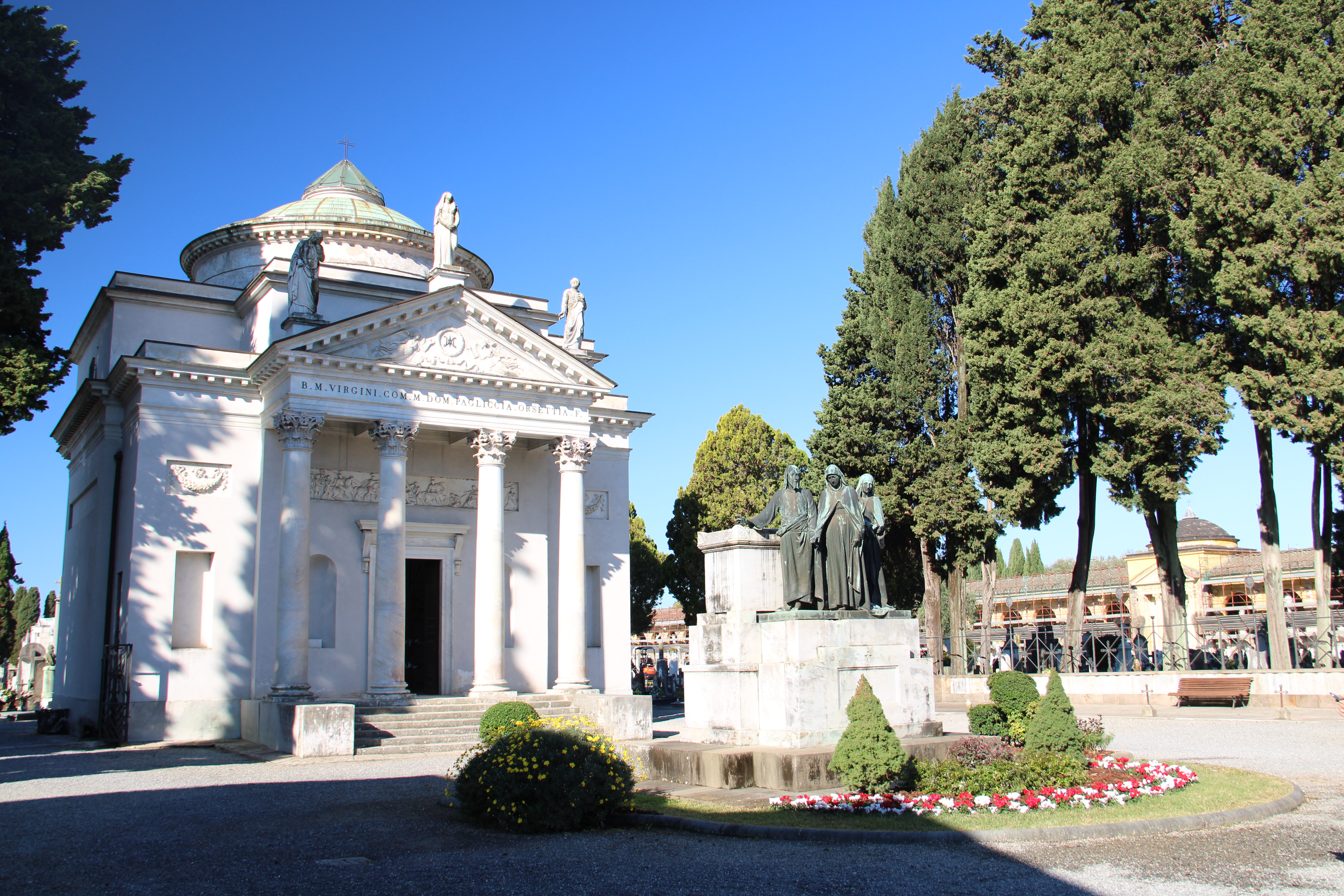
Cappella Orsetti, Monumental Cemetery of Lucca

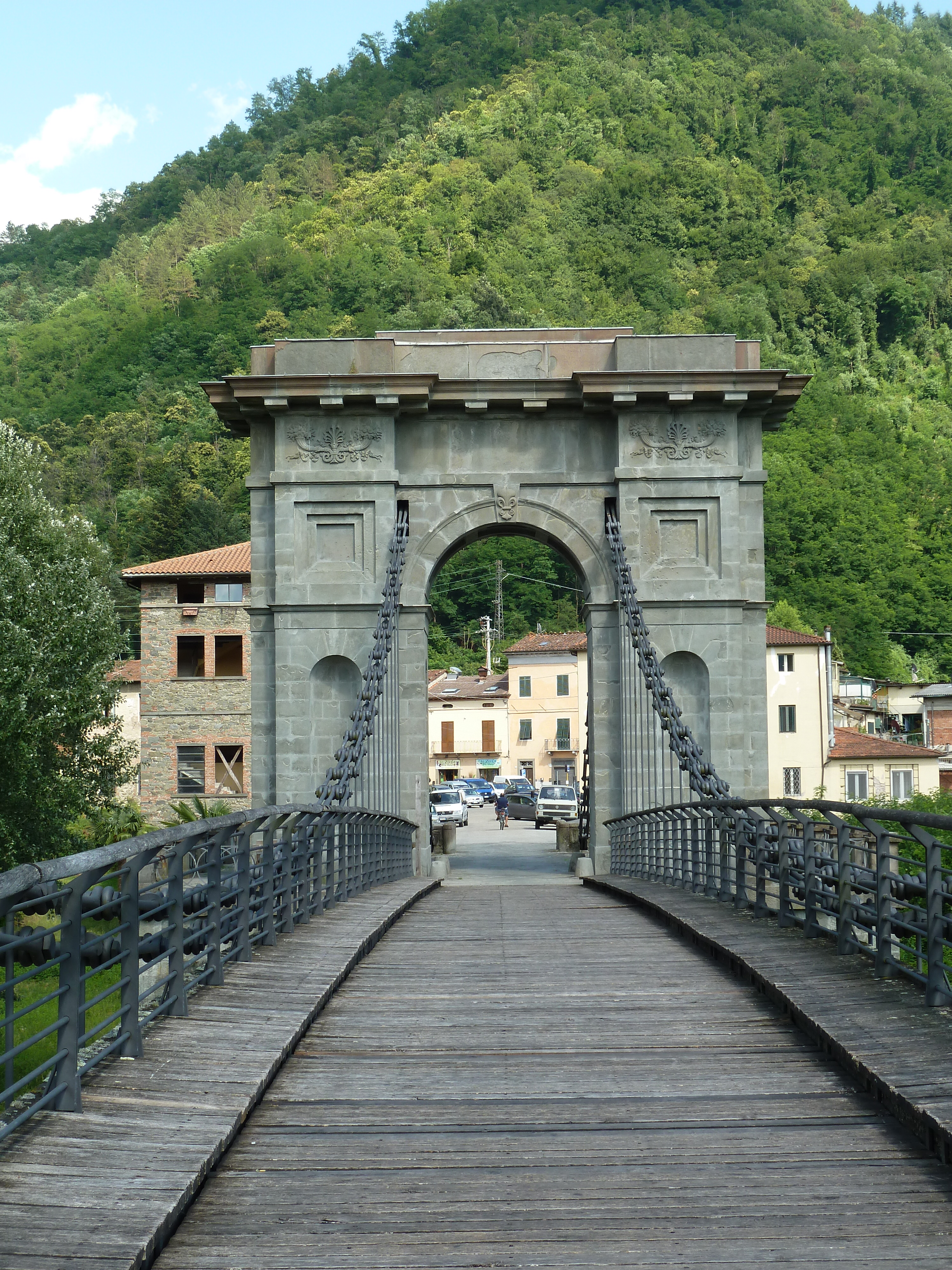
Ponte catene, Fornoli

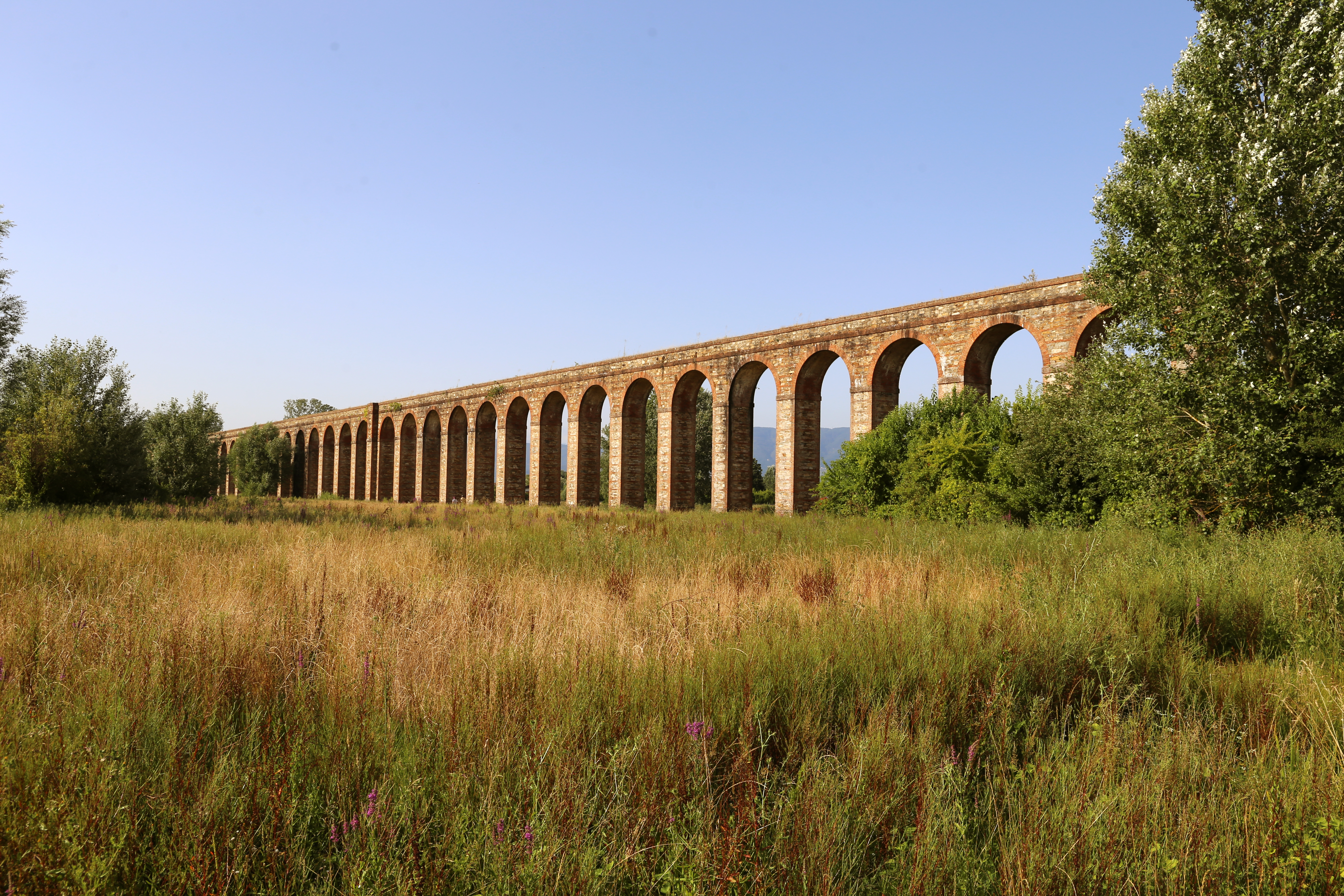
Aqueduct Nottolini, Lucca

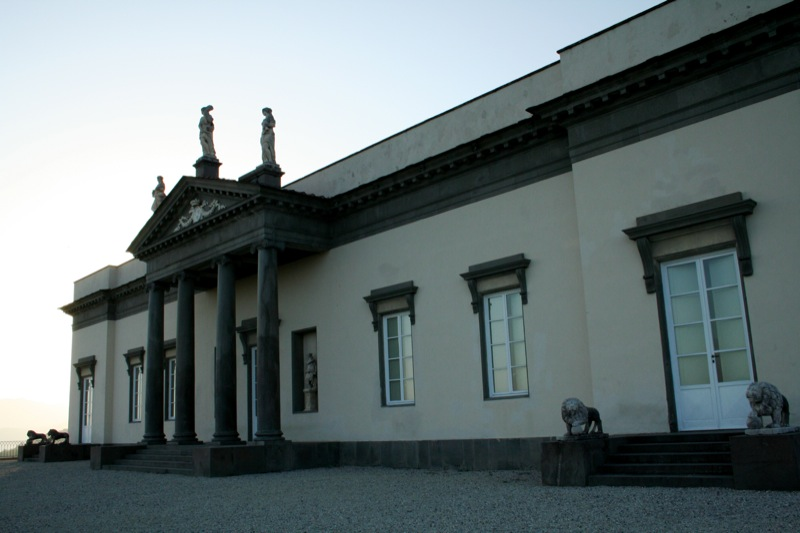
Specola di Lucca

== Bibliography ==
- Giusti, A.M. (1987). "L'acquedotto di Maria Luisa a 155 anni dalla realizzazione". Rivista di Archeologia, Storia, Costume. 15: 79–96.
- Bedini, G.; Nolledi, G. (1988). "Lorenzo Nottolini ingegnere-architetto a Lucca". Casabella. 546: 44–55.
- Lera, G.; Bedini, G.; Regoli, V.; Nolledi, G. (1988). Lorenzo Nottolini, il segno di un uomo nella storia del territorio. Lucca: M.P. Fazzi.
- Giusti, M.A.; Tucci, G. (1988). "For the conservation of Lorenzo Nottolini's aqueduct in Lucca: survey and representation of historic infrastructure" (PDF). XX International Symposium CIPA, Torino, 26 September-1 October 2005. pp. 328–333.
