= Ponte delle Catene, Bagni di Lucca =

19th-century suspension bridge in Bagni di Lucca, Tuscany, Italy

Coordinates: 44°00′22″N 10°33′45″E

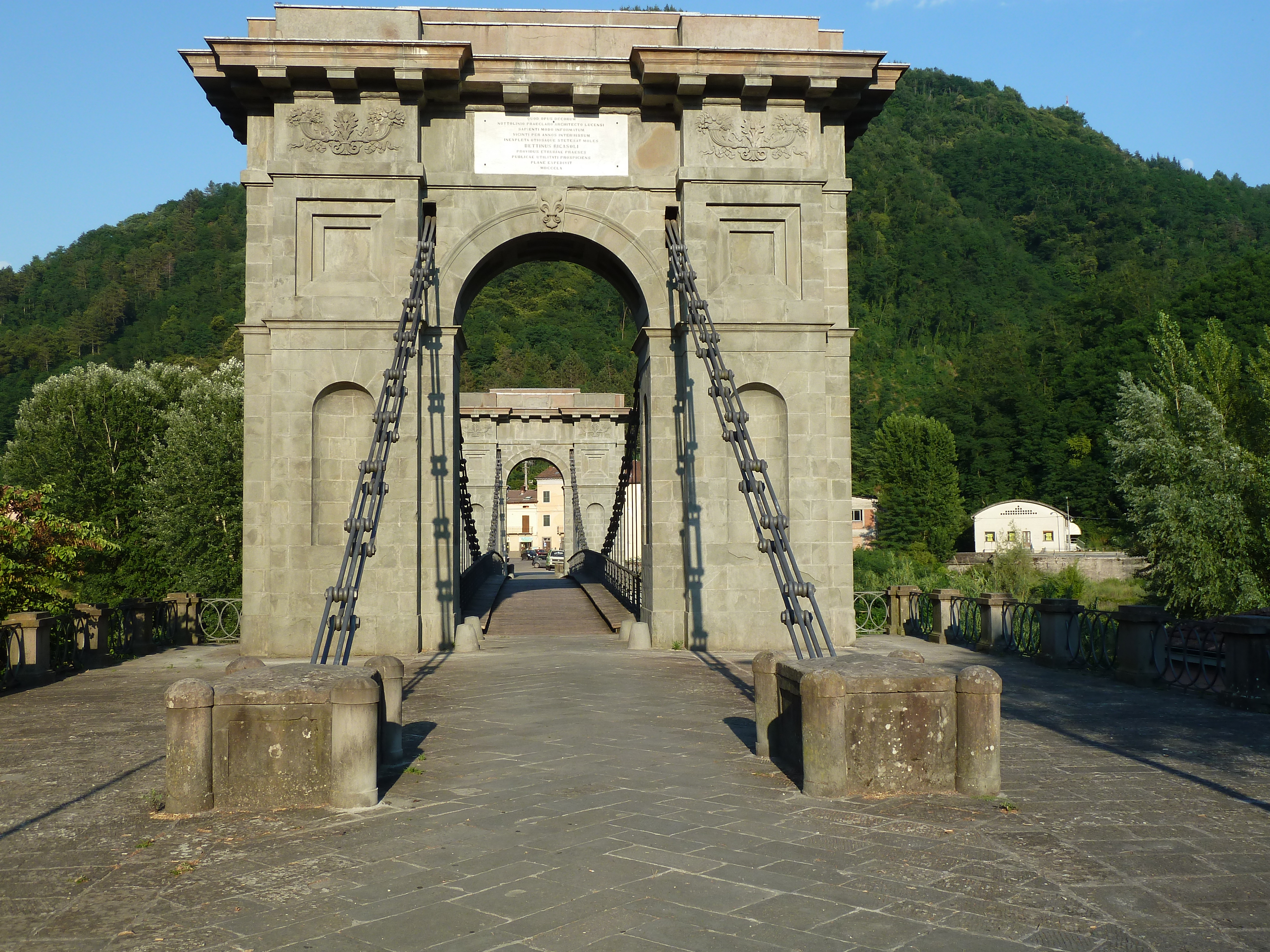
Ponte delle Catene

The Ponte delle Catene or Bridge of Chains is a 19th-century suspension bridge in Bagni di Lucca, Tuscany. The Bridge spans the river Lima, a branch of the Serchio, and links Fornoli and Chifenti.

When a prior 1317 stone bridge attributed to Castruccio Castracani, had been destroyed by a flood, this bridge was commissioned in 1840 by Carlo Ludovico from the Neoclassical architect Lorenzo Nottolini. The architect travelled to England to study the then-newfangled suspension bridges, he was impressed by the Hammersmith Bridge, and the planned Clifton Suspension Bridge between Avon and Bristol.

At each bank, Nottolini erected arches reminiscent of Ancient Roman triumphal arches. The plaques (one in Latin the other in Italian) recognize the patronage of the Duke of Tuscany via Bettino Ricasoli. The wooden roadway had been destroyed in World War two by the retreating Germans and repaired in the 1950s.
