= Specola di Lucca =

Neoclassic-style former astronomical observatory in Italy

Coordinates: 43.9°N 10.56°E

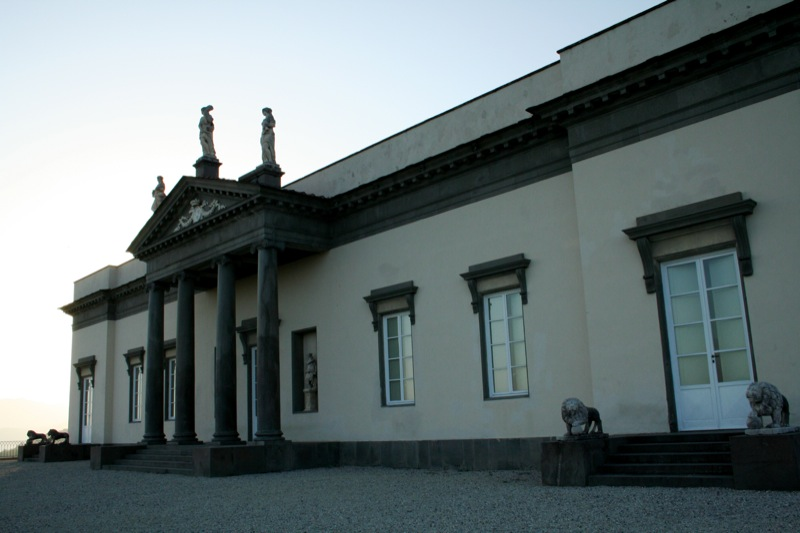
Specola di Lucca

The Specola Di Lucca is a Neoclassic-style former astronomical observatory built during the early 19th century near the Royal Villa at Marlia, near Lucca, region of Tuscany, Italy. The architect Lorenzo Nottolini was commissioned in 1819 to build the structure by Duchess Maria Luisa di Borbone.

It is stated the contemporary Hungarian astronomer, Baron Franz Xaver von Zach found the location, with views of the countryside, an enchanting place. The prominent French astronomer, Jean-Louis Pons, was recruited to be the director. In 1824, with the passing of the Duchess, the project ceased, and Pons moved in 1825 to teach astronomy at La Specola in Florence. The projected cylindrical observation tower for the Specola di Lucca was never built.

The building became a cafe, and after years of abandonment, a private residence after 1980s. It is undergoing refurbishment.

== See also ==
- List of astronomical observatories
