= Hunting Lodge of Duke Charles II of Parma =

The Hunting Lodge of Duke Charles II of Parma, also listed in Italian as either Casino di Caccia di Carlo Ludovico Borbone, or Villa Bellosguardo in reference to later owners, is a rural villa in the hamlet of Pieve Santo Stefano (Lucca) in the province of Lucca, Tuscany, Italy. The main villa was designed circa 1838 by Lorenzo Nottolini for Charles II, Duke of Parma. The piano nobile, with a Rococo roofline leads from a balcony via two curved external staircases to a garden belvedere. It is presently used for lodging and cultural functions.
