= Domus Galilaeana =

Library

Coordinates: 43°43′6.78″N 10°23′49.63″E

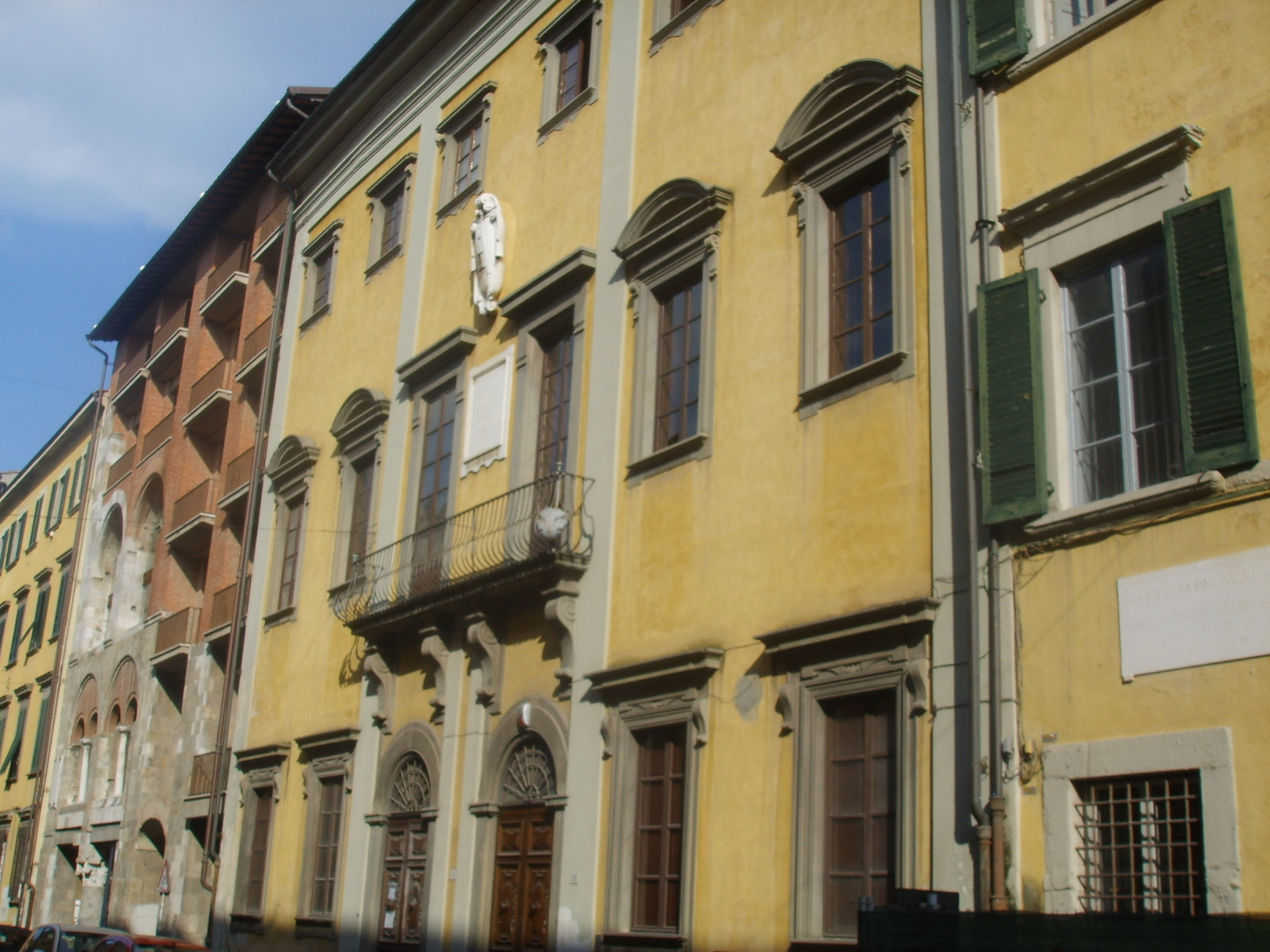
Outside view

The Domus Galilaeana is a cultural and scientific institute and library, dedicated to the history of science, located in via Santa Maria #26, in Pisa, region of Tuscany, Italy. Currently, the Domus Galilaeana houses a library with more than 40,000 books and important files relating to scientists of the 20th century.

== History ==
The idea of creating an institute dedicated to the Pisan scientist was born in 1938 in anticipation of the celebrations for the centenary of the First Meeting of Italian scientists held in Pisa in 1839. The institute’s formation was the initiative of Giovanni Gentile and sponsored by the Italian Society for the Progress of Sciences, and was established in Rome with a commission to identify goals and objectives of the new society, as well as the city and its location within the city.

The choice fell on Pisa. The presentation was made in 1939 in the Aula Magna of the University of Pisa. The Domus Galilaeana received its legal status with the law of 1941.

Since then, the establishment has collected all the ancient and modern publications on Galileo and coordinated studies in the history of science, thanks to a large archive and a major library. In 2002 this public institution turned into a foundation, becoming subject to private law.

== Headquarters ==
The Head of the Institute is located in Santa Maria street, in the old Palazzotto Specola, situated between the houses of Antonio Pacinotti and Gabba. It is not the birthplace of Galileo, which can be found near the tribunal court, but the building that once housed the university library and the observatory tower for astronomical observation. The tower was demolished in the early part of the 19th century because of its instability.

== Museum ==
The Domus Galilaeana can not be considered a real museum. Throughout its history it has retained various scientific instruments on behalf of other institutions. It housed the instruments of Enrico Fermi, now in Rome, and equipment belonging to Antonio Pacinotti, now in the Museo degli Strumenti per il Calcolo di Pisa, including the "Macchinetta", the first model of an electric motor generator. Domus has also saved from destruction the CEP, Pisana Electronic Calculator, which forms part of the Museo degli Strumenti per il Calcolo collection. The instrumentation currently present at the Domus is closely bound to the archives found here, along with the "sources" for the experiments on induced radioactivity of Enrico Fermi, the photographic instrumentation of the astronomer Pius Emanuelle and various machines from the Institute of Technical Physics, University of Pisa. Regular courses dedicated to schools are held on the most important characters in the history of science, from Galileo Galilei to the physicists of the 20th century.
