= Villa Marlia =

Villa in Capannori, Tuscany, Italy

Villa Reale di Marlia
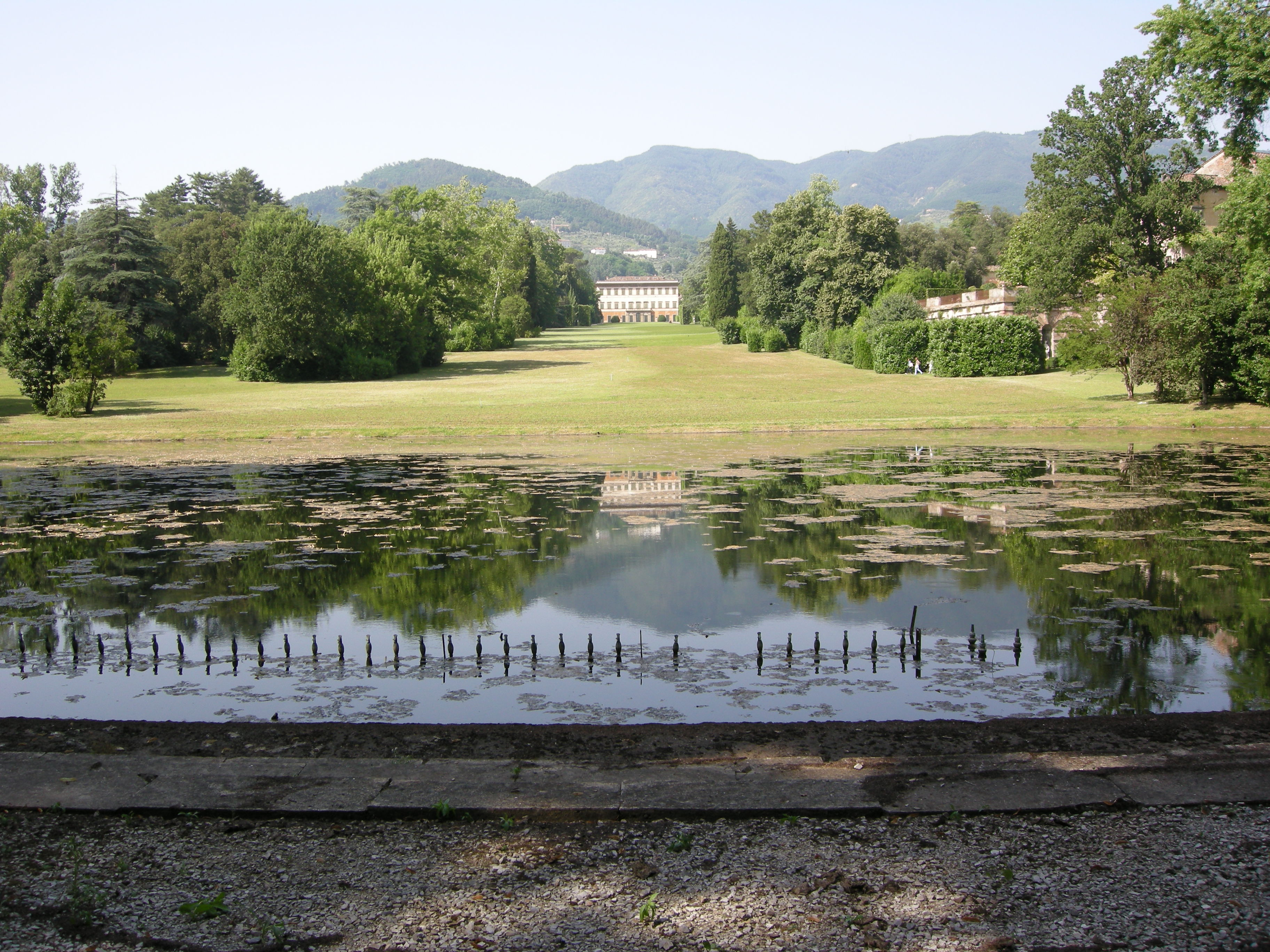
- 17th century Villa Reale di Marlia from 19th century English landscape park Laghetto.
- Interactive map of the Villa Reale di Marlia area

General information
- Architectural style: Italian Renaissance, Baroque, Neoclassical
- Location: Capannori, Province of Lucca, Tuscany, Italy
- Coordinates: 43.8964°N 10.5485°E
- Construction started: 15th-century
- Completed: 19th-century

The Villa Marlia or Villa Reale di Marlia is a late-Renaissance palazzo or villa, and its estate's property that includes renowned gardens and adjacent villas and follies within the compound. It is located in Capannori, in the Province of Lucca, west of Florence, in the northern Tuscany region of Italy.

== History ==
=== Villa Marlia ===
The 15th century Italian Renaissance villa was in the Buonvisi family from 1517 to 1651, left relatively unchanged. In the 17th century the Palazzina dell’Orologio, with dominant clock tower, was constructed. The gardens were created in the second half of the 17th century, in the Giardino all'italiana style, influenced by Italian Renaissance gardens and Baroque gardens.

==== Features ====
The features include

- Teatro d'Acqua — Theatre of Water; fountains, statues, prominent pebble mosaic and tufa exhedra axis terminus.
- Teatro di Verzura — Green Theatre (1652); open-air with hedged walls and stage wings, terracotta Commedia dell'arte statues.
- Giardino dei Limoni — Lemon garden; a potted lemon-tree garden, with large ornamental pool encircled by a stone balustrade, two statues of Giants spill urns into pool, representing the local rivers Arno and Serchio.

=== Villa Reale di Marlia ===
In 1806 the sister of Napoleon, Elisa Bonaparte Baciocchi Princesse Française, purchased the entire complex. She acquired the adjacent Villa del Vescovo with its sixteenth-century Italian Renaissance garden and grotto, and other bordering properties, which doubled the estate's size.

Reale (royal) joined the property's name, to become Villa Reale di Marlia, or locally Villa Reale. The property had become an official royal residence to serve her upon becoming the Duchess of Lucca and Princess of Piombino, Grand Duchess of Tuscany, and Countess of Compignano — with the power as the monarch to rule over these Tuscan territories granted by Napoleon.

In 1811 Elisa Bonaparte had the villa renovated in the Neoclassical style, and the Neoclassical pair of palazzine gatehouses and entrance elements were built. From the Villa del Vescovo gardens the elaborate nymphaeum pavilion, Grotta del Dio Pan or Pan’s Grotto, was left in Baroque splendor.

The lower original Italian gardens were redesigned into an expansive English landscape park, then in fashion. It has the Laghetto or Small Lake, as a reflective focal point and water garden, with a broad terrace accented by statues. Bonaparte added naturalistic groups of trees to transition into the woodland gardens. In 1814, after her brother's downfall and exile, Bonaparte was replaced as monarch by the victorious Bourbons, and Marie Louise Borbón of the House of Bourbon-Parma became the Duchess of Lucca and owner of Villa Reale di Marlia. Lorenzo Nottolini was commissioned to construct the Specola, an observatory, in the lower garden of the landscape park.

== 20th–21st centuries ==
The estate was acquired by a branch of Count Pecci—Blunt family in 1923, who restored the villa and follies, and the gardens were replanted with the original plant selections. The Giardino Spagnolo, a Moorish Spanish Garden with fountains and rills, and Art Deco design influences, was created to connect the 17th century Palazzina dell’Orologio and Grotta del Dio Pan.

In 2015 the Villa Reale Di Marlia was sold. The villa will return to host cultural events such as Lucca Classica Music Festival, the Exhibition of Ancient Camellias of Lucca, and the Festival Le Rinascenze. Meanwhile, the gardens are open to the public and can be visited paying an entrance ticket. There is a cafeteria in the games pavilion.

== Gallery ==
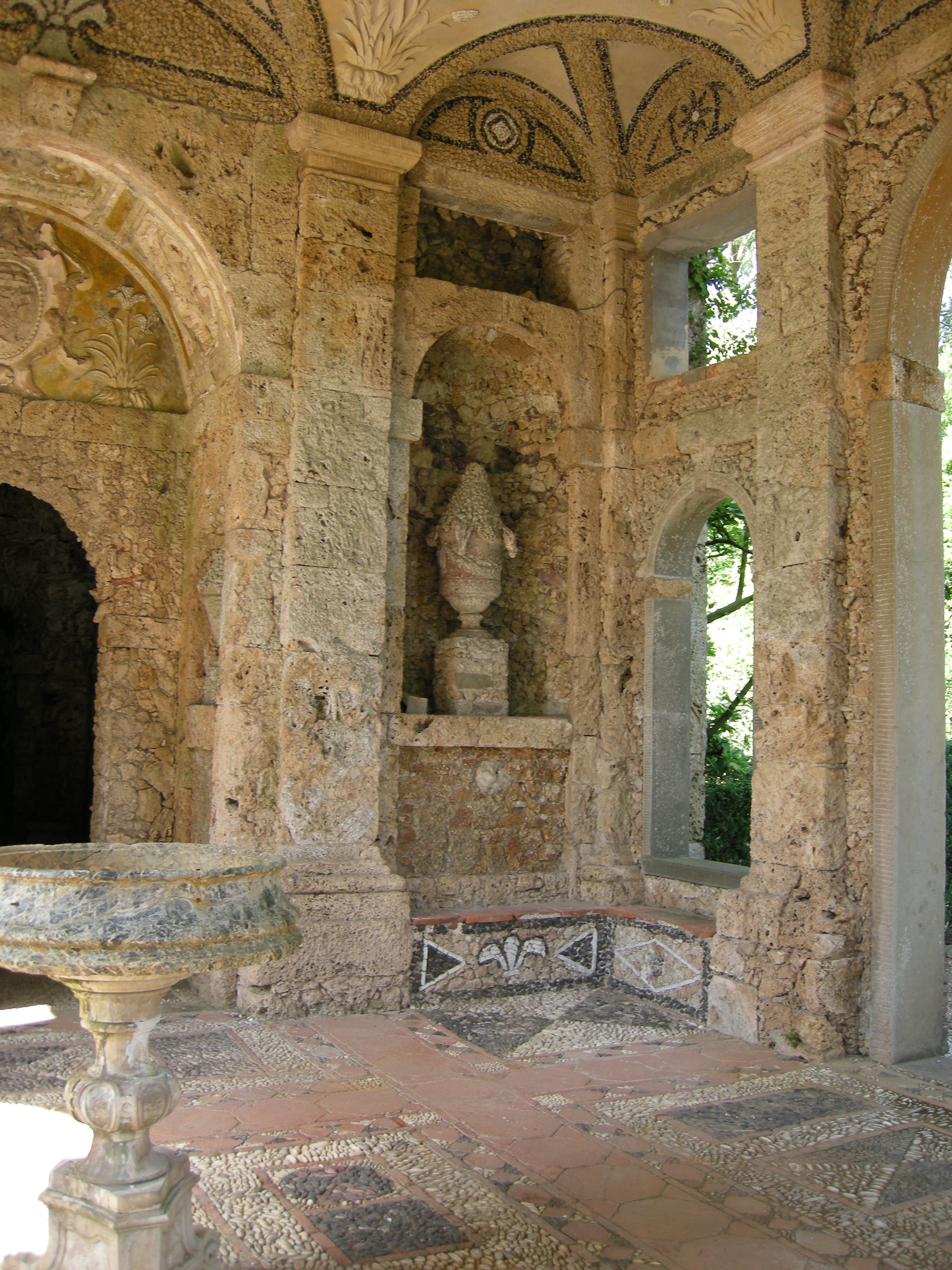
Pan’s Grotto

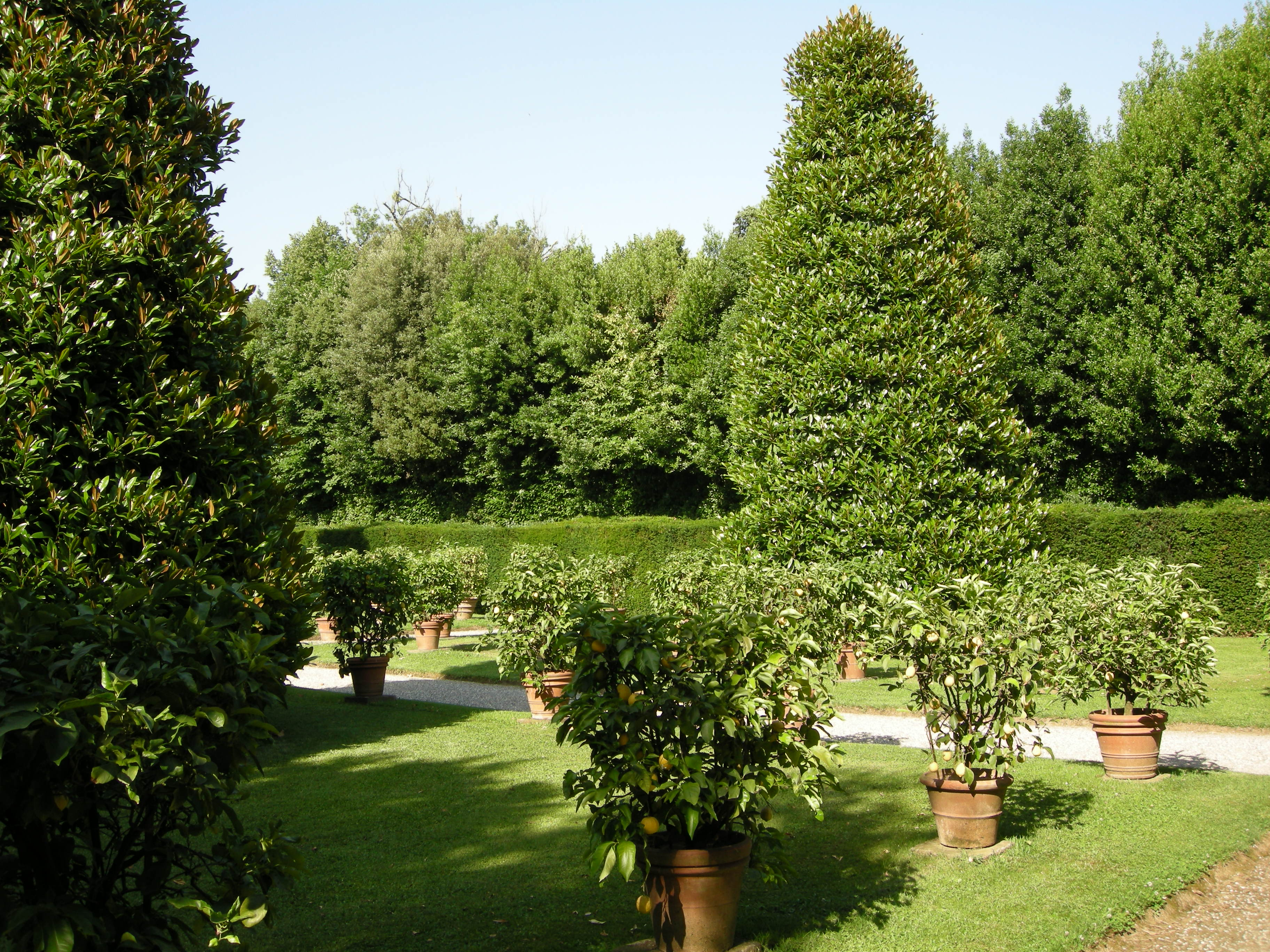
Lemon garden

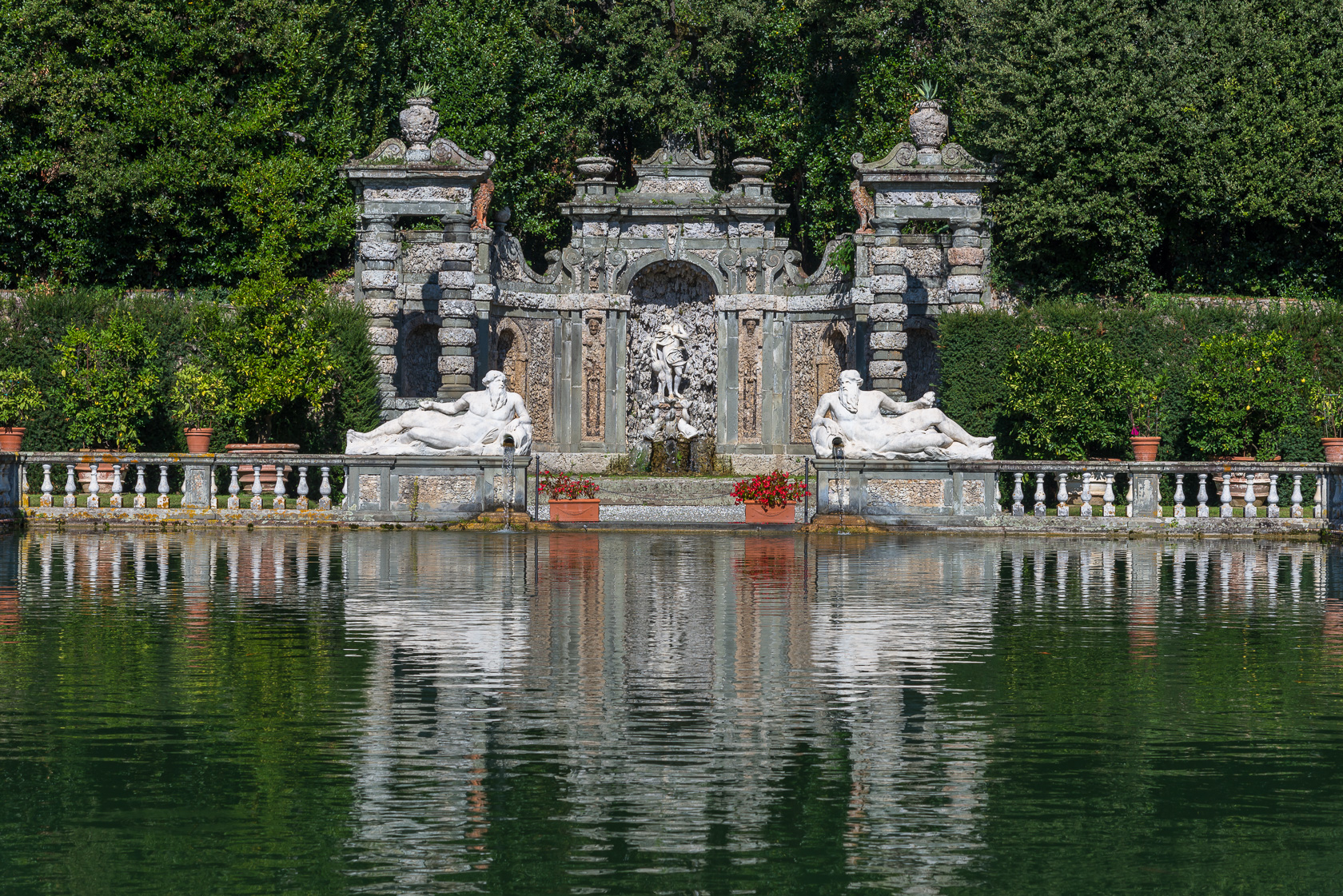
Ornamental pool

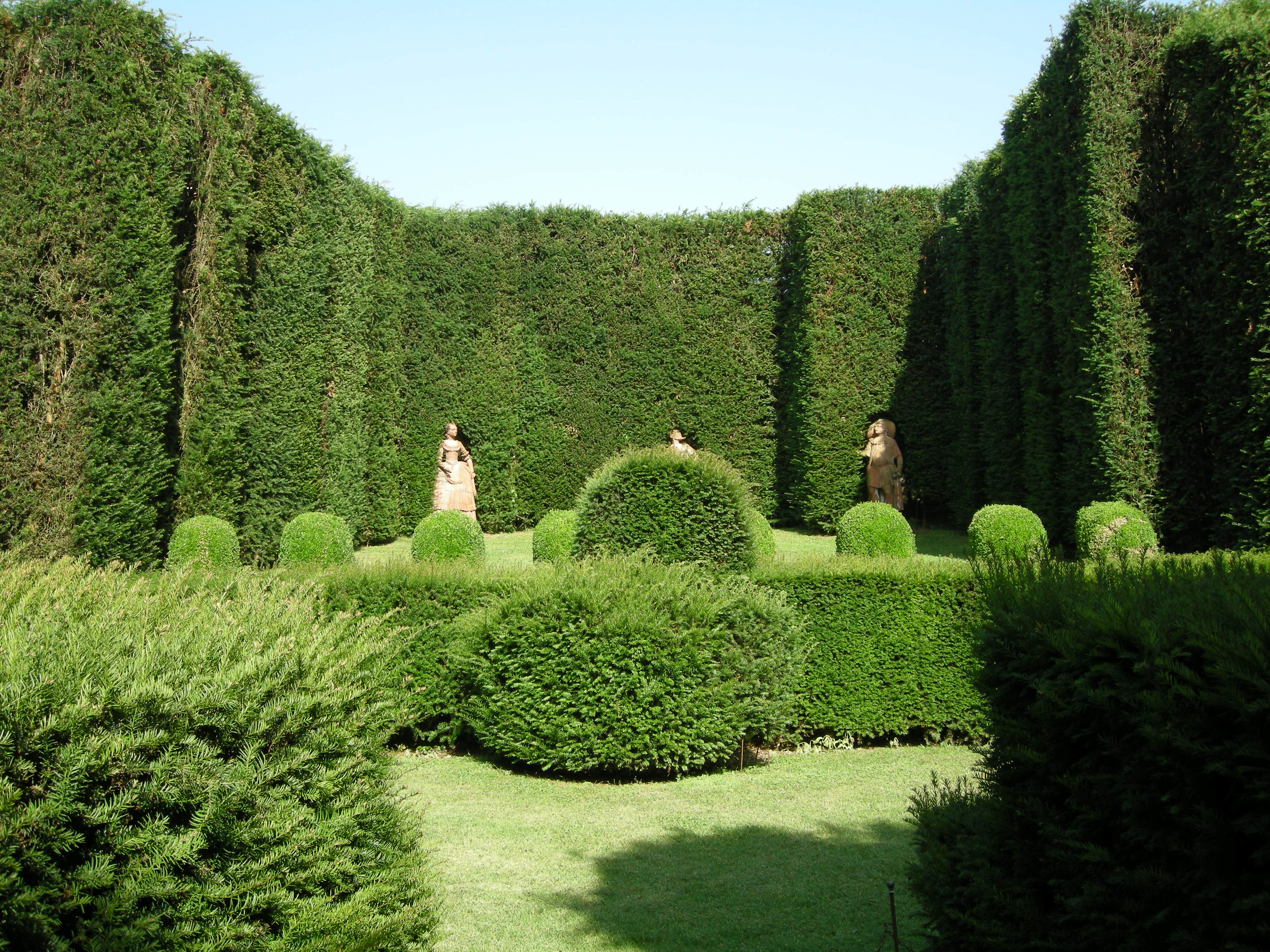
Green theatre

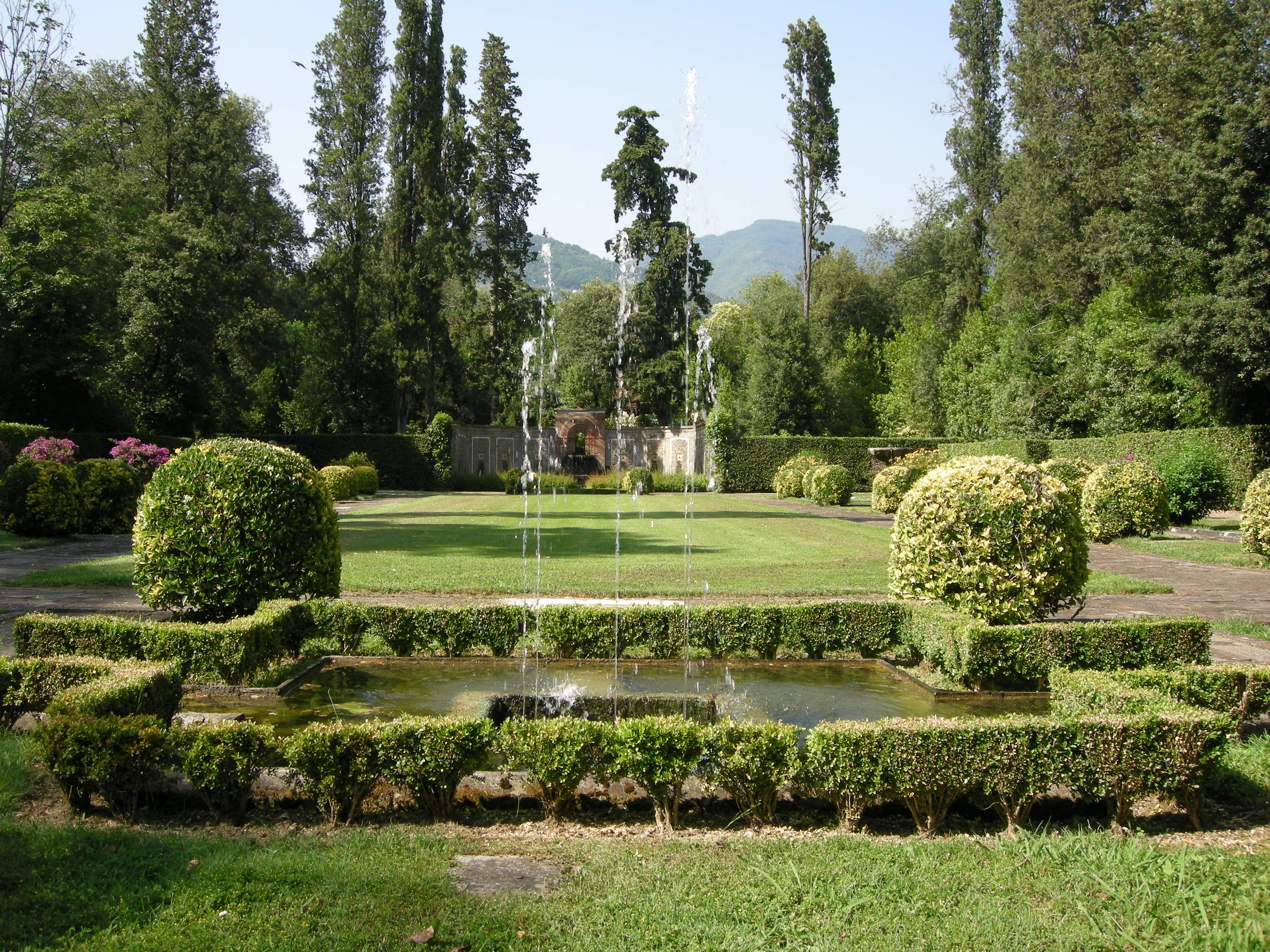
The Spanish garden

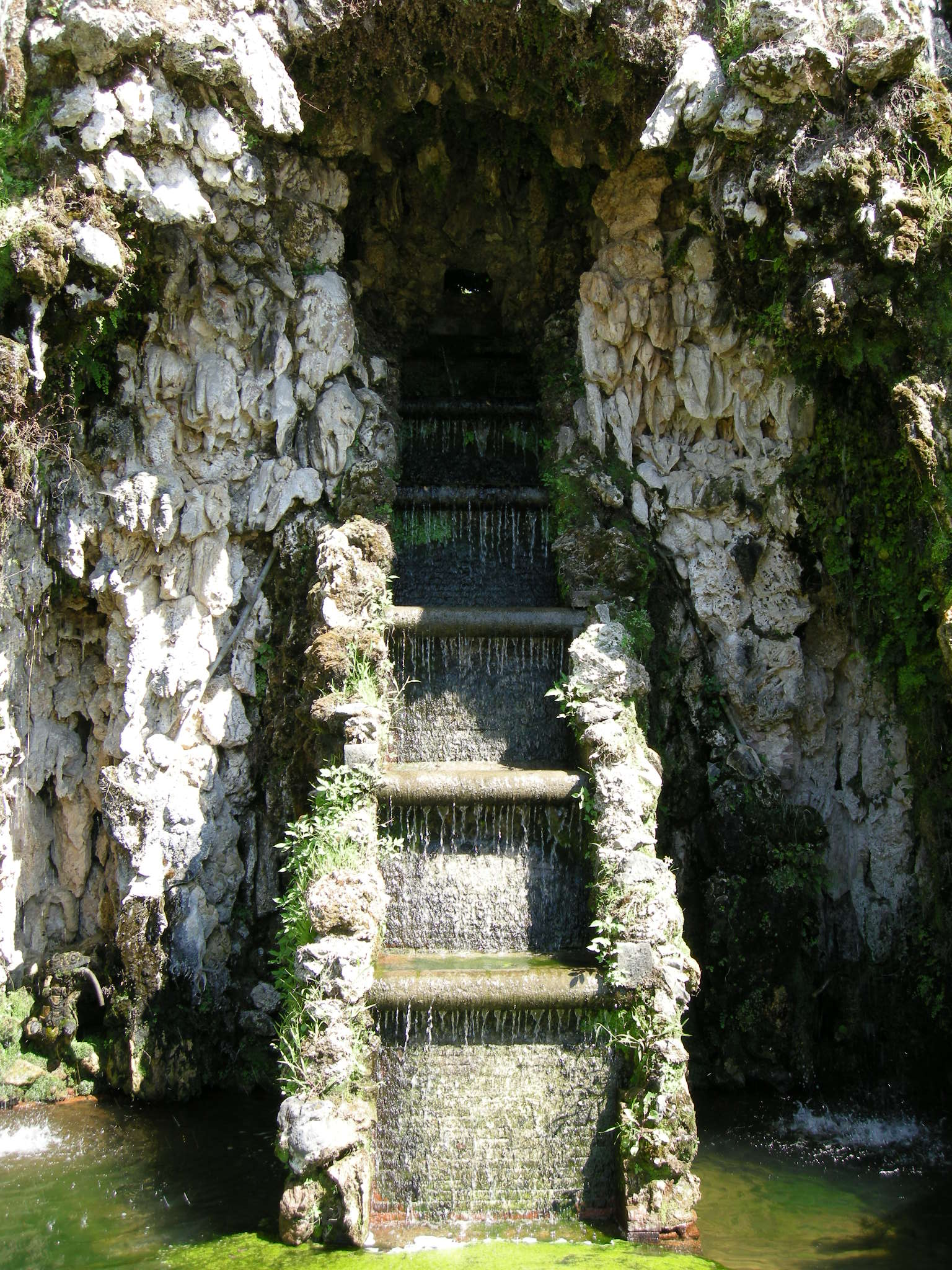
Grotto fountain at Teatro d'Acqua
