= Maria Anna Rosa Caiani =

Blessed Maria Anna Rosa Caiani
- Born: 2 November 1863; Poggio a Caiano, Florence, Kingdom of Italy
- Died: 8 August 1921 (aged 57); Poggio a Caiano, Florence, Kingdom of Italy
- Venerated in: Roman Catholic Church
- Beatified: 23 April 1989, Saint Peter's Square, Vatican City by Pope John Paul II
- Feast: 8 August
- Attributes: Nun's habit
- Patronage: Minim Sisters of the Sacred Heart

Maria Anna Rosa Caiani (2 November 1863 – 8 August 1921) was an Italian Roman Catholic nun from Florence who established the Minim Sisters of the Sacred Heart in 1902. Caiani assumed the religious name of "Maria Margherita of the Sacred Heart" in 1902 after she professed into her new congregation that was devoted to the Sacred Heart of Jesus.

Her beatification was celebrated on 23 April 1989 in Saint Peter's Square, Vatican City by Pope John Paul II.

== Life ==
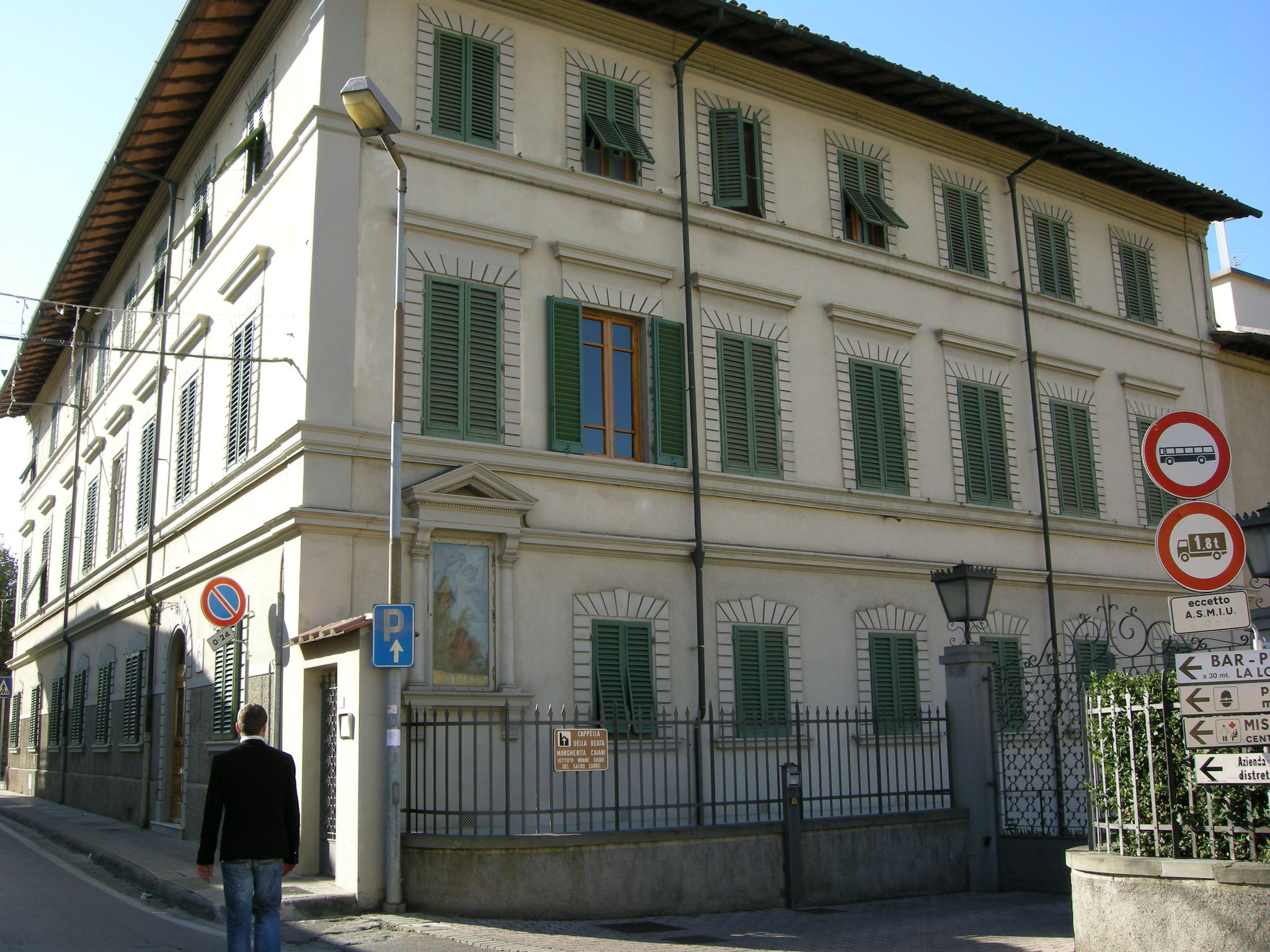
Mother House of the Minim Sisters of the Sacred Heart

Maria Anna Rosa Caiani was born to Jacopo Caiani and Luisa Fortini on 2 November 1863 in Florence as the third of five children. Her siblings were all brothers including Gustavo (1868–1879) and Osea. She was baptized at Bonistallo in the Church of Santa Maria Assunta in Bonistallo. As a child she was called Marianna.

Younger brother Gustavo suffered a grave illness for less than a decade after suffering a hip fracture in 1872 and Caiani cared for him until his death at the age of eleven when she was sixteen in 1879. After the death of her brother she decided that - in a humble and charitable spirit - she wanted to care for others who required assistance. Her father died not long after in 1884 and her mother followed less than a decade after this in 1890. After the death of her father she helped her brother Osea in a tobacco shop but the death of her mother following this left her alone since all her brothers had married. It was in her solitude that she realized what her vocation was and found the desire to give herself to God and to others. She had entered the Congregation of the Sisters of Saint Maximus of Turin in Campi Bisenzio but grew dissatisfied and left.

On 1 November 1891 she visited her sick aunt where she would later meet and become friends with Maria Fiaschi who was her junior of less than a decade. It was in 1893 that Giousè Menchi recommended Caiani that she go to a Benedictine convent. It was there that she discovered that the cloister was not the life for her and so she left. It was around this time that she met Bishop Pio Alberto del Corona who encouraged her work. She opened a home with Fiaschi on 19 September 1894 that took in twelve children with the permission of the Bishop of Pistoia Marcello Mazzanti.

In her hometown she founded her order on 15 December 1902 and named it the Minim Sisters of the Sacred Heart where she took a new religious name and progressed with five other new recruits. Bishop Mazzanti gave his permission for Caiani to establish her new congregation. In 1910 she sought the guidance of Elena Guerra so that she could take an example for her work for her congregation. She also had a private audience with the Archbishop of Milan Cardinal Andrea Carlo Ferrari who also encouraged her to continue the work of her congregation. With the establishment of her order she was made the Superior General and in the first general chapter in 1915 she was retained in her post.

She died on 8 August 1921 in Florence. After her death she left a total of 124 religious branches and 13 houses of the congregation. At present it has expanded to places such as Israel and Sri Lanka. Pope Pius XI approved her new congregation in 1926.

== Beatification ==
The beatification process commenced in both Florence and Pistoia and first started in Florence in a diocesan process that commenced on 8 August 1952 and concluded on 13 November 1957. The opening of the cause in 1952 allowed for her to be conferred the title Servant of God. However the formal introduction of the cause came on 15 December 1981 which solidified the use of the title Servant of God. The second process in Pistoia opened not long after and concluded prior to the validation of the two processes in 1985. This allowed for the postulation to submit the Positio to the Congregation for the Causes of Saints in 1985 for further evaluation of her life and virtues.

On 5 June 1986 she was proclaimed to be Venerable after Pope John Paul II recognized that she had lived a life of heroic virtue.

The miracle required for her beatification was investigated in a diocesan process in Lucca and was validated on 7 March 1986. The Congregation for the Causes of Saints evaluated the miracle and received the approval of the pope. John Paul II beatified her on 23 April 1989.

The postulator assigned to the cause is the Franciscan Giovangiuseppe Califano.
