= Barducci =

Barducci is an Italian surname. Notable people with this surname include:

- Aligi Barducci (1913–1944), Italian soldier and resistance leader
- Giovanni Battista Barducci (died 1661), Italian Roman Catholic prelate
