= Alessandro del Caccia =

17th-century Roman Catholic bishop

Most Reverend Alessandro del Caccia
- Bishop of Pistoia
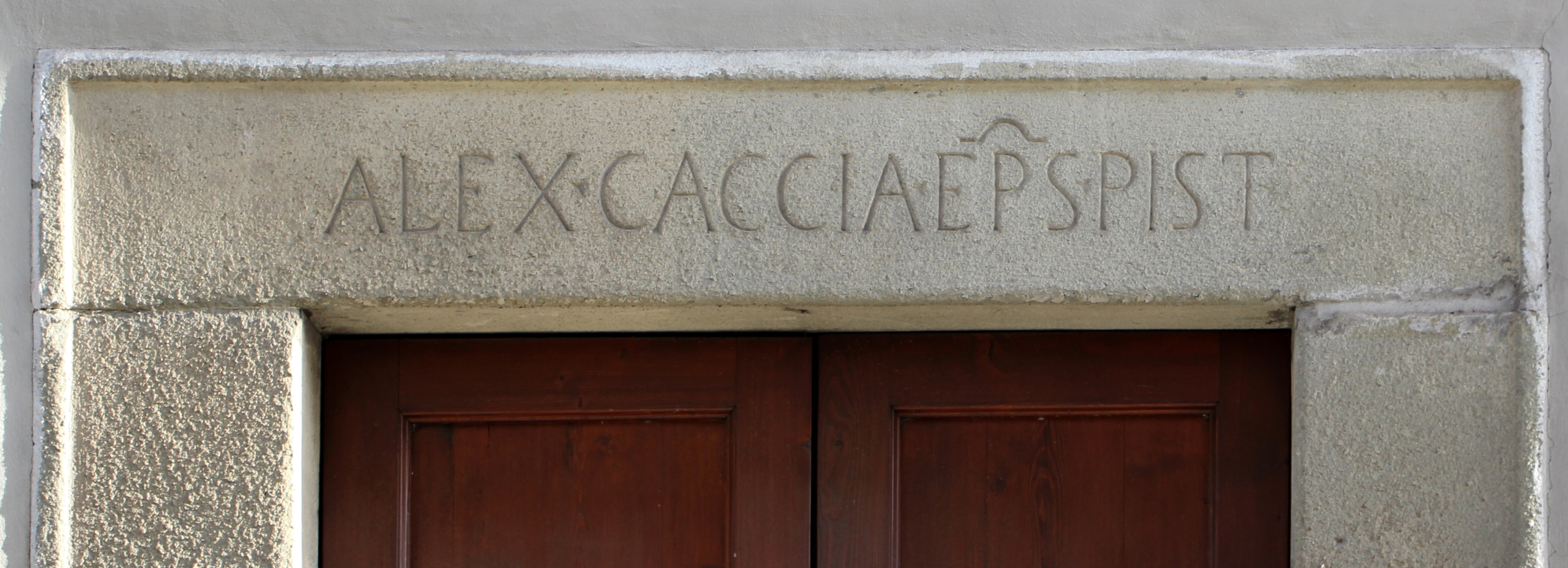
- Church: Catholic Church
- In office: 1600–1649
- Predecessor: Fulvio Passerini
- Successor: Francesco Nerli (seniore)

Orders
- Consecration: 9 Jul 1600 by Alessandro Ottaviano de' Medici

Personal details
- Died: 4 September 1649
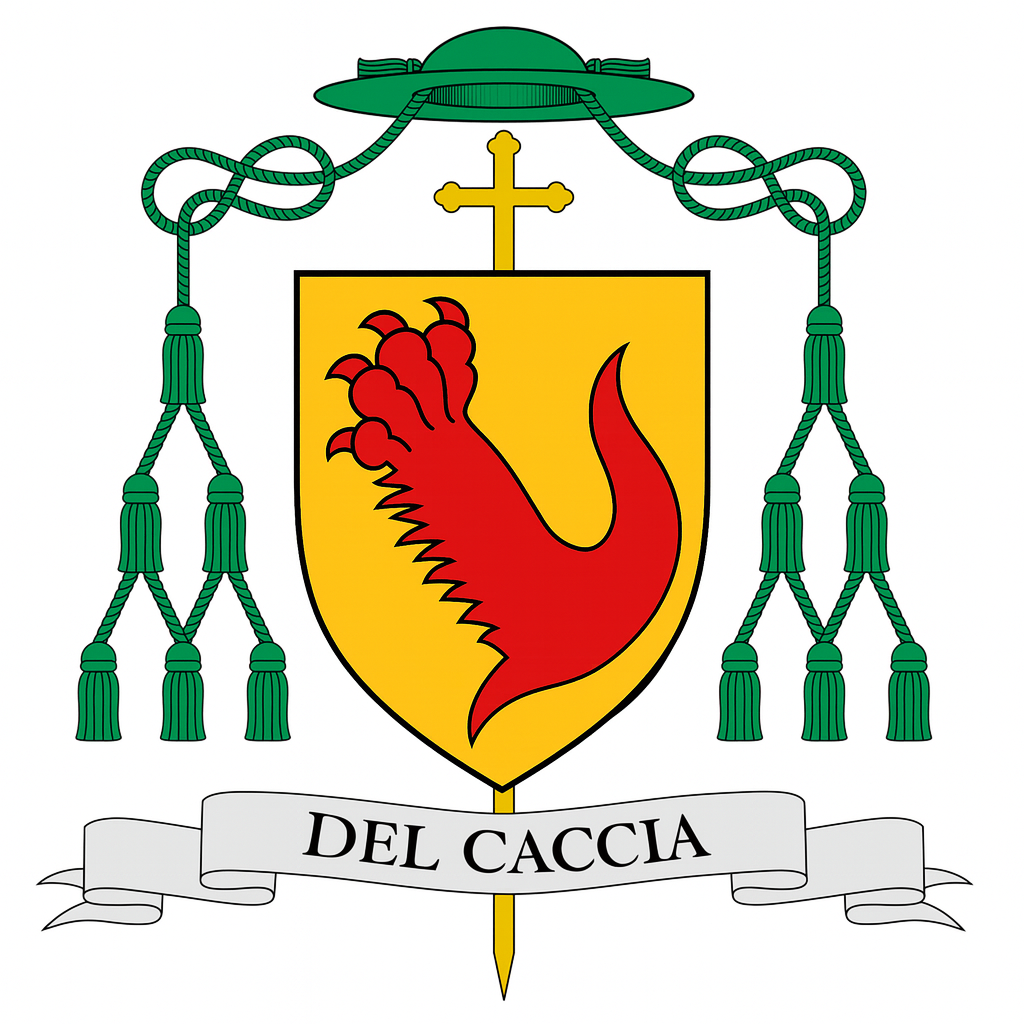
- Coat of arms

Alessandro del Caccia (died 1649) was a Roman Catholic prelate who served as Bishop of Pistoia (1600–1649).

== Biography ==
On 3 Jul 1600, he was appointed during the papacy of Pope Clement VIII as Bishop of Pistoia. On 9 Jul 1600, he was consecrated bishop by Alessandro Ottaviano de' Medici, Archbishop of Florence, with Bernardo del Nero, Bishop of Bisignano, and Andrea Sorbolonghi, Bishop of Gubbio, serving as co-consecrators. He served as Bishop of Pistoia until his death on 4 Sep 1649.

== Episcopal succession ==
While bishop, he was the principal co-consecrator of:

- Cosmas Minerbetti, Bishop of Cortona (1622);
- Basile Cacace, Auxiliary Bishop of Ravenna and Titular Archbishop of Ephesus (1624);
- Francesco Nori, Bishop of San Miniato (1624); and
- Giovanni della Robbia, Bishop of Bertinoro (1624).

== External links and additional sources ==
- Cheney, David M. "Diocese of Pistoia". Catholic-Hierarchy.org. (for Chronology of Bishops) ^{[self-published]}
- Chow, Gabriel. "Diocese of Pistoia (Italy)". GCatholic.org. (for Chronology of Bishops) ^{[self-published]}

Catholic Church titles
Preceded by Fulvio Passerini	Bishop of Pistoia; 1600–1649	Succeeded by Francesco Nerli (seniore)
