= Fausto Tardelli =

Italian prelate of the Catholic Church

His Excellency, The Most Reverend Fausto Tardelli
- Bishop of Pistoia; Bishop of Pescia
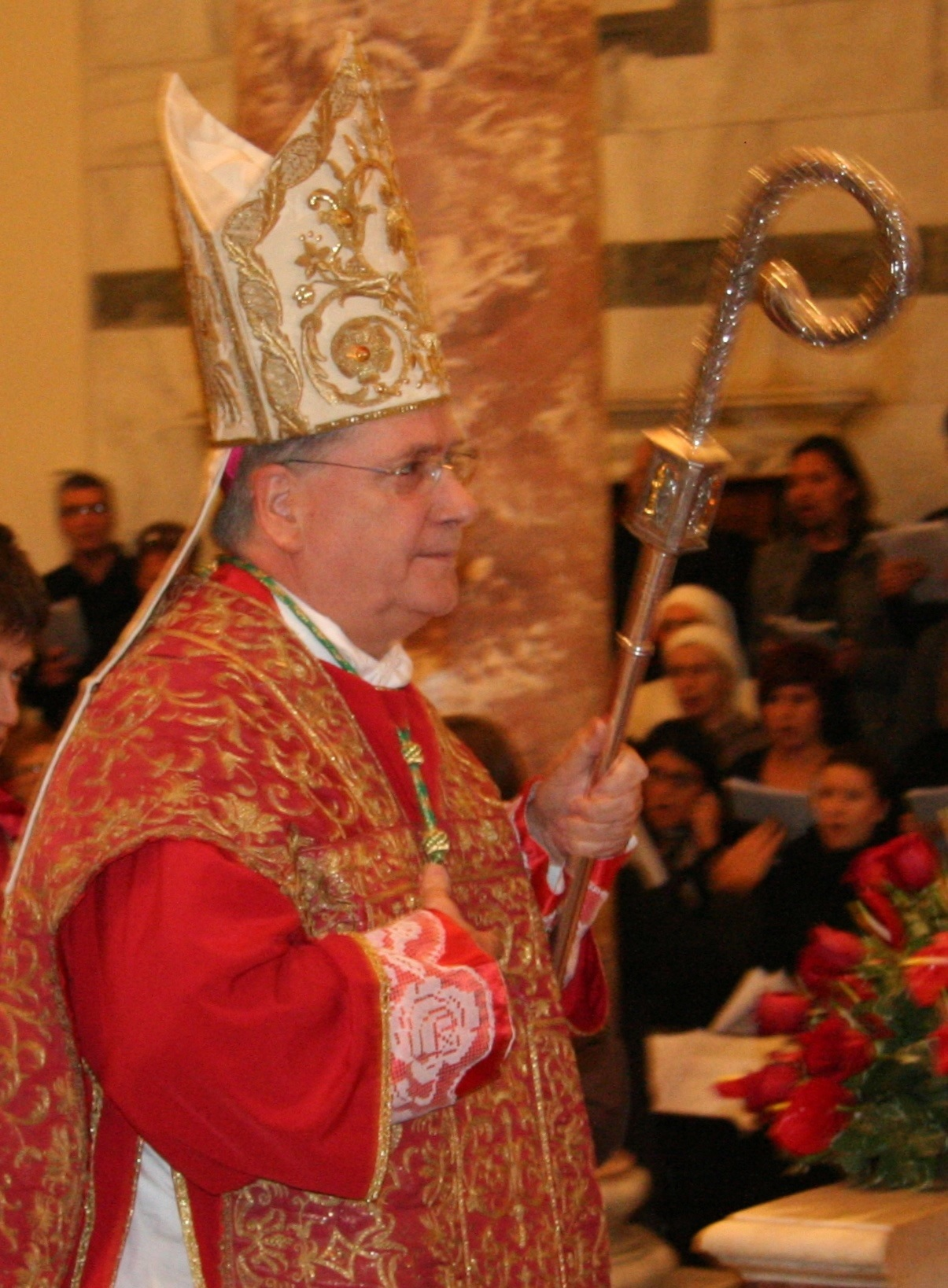
- Church: Roman Catholic Church
- Archdiocese: Florence (Pistoia); Pisa (Pescia)
- Diocese: Pistoia; Pescia
- Appointed: 8 October 2014 (Pistoia); 14 October 2023 (Pescia)
- Installed: 8 December 2014 (Pistoia); 14 January 2024 (Pescia)
- Predecessor: Mansueto Bianchi (Pistoia); Roberto Filippini (Pescia)
- Previous post: Bishop of San Miniato (2004–2014)

Personal details
- Born: 5 January 1951 (age 75) Lucca, Italy
- Coat of arms: Fausto Tardelli's coat of arms

Ordination history
History
Episcopal consecration
- Principal consecrator: Bruno Tommasi
- Co-consecrators: Paolo Romeo; Edoardo Ricci

Fausto Tardelli (born 5 January 1951) is an Italian prelate of the Catholic Church who has been bishop of Pistoia since 2014 and bishop of Pescia as well since 2023. He was bishop of San Miniato from 2004 to 2014.

== Biography ==
Fausto Tardelli was born in Lucca on 5 January 1951 in Lucca. He entered the diocesan seminary of the Archdiocese of Lucca in 1964, and after completing all his studies there was ordained a priest of that archdiocese on 29 June 1974. He then studied in Rome, first for four years at the Almo Collegio Capranica and then at the Pontifical Alphonsian Academy, earning a licentiate in 1977 and a doctorate in moral theology in 1986, with a thesis on "Alterità e etica. La relazione con l'altro e l'impegno etico nelle opere di Emmanuel Levinas". He also studied at the Pontifical Lateran University in 1981-1982.

Starting in 1978 he was Professor of Moral Theology at the seminary in Lucca and at the Interdiocesan Studio of Camaiore (part of the Theological Faculty of Central Italy). He was Scout ecclesiastical assistant in Lucca beginning in 1979; assistant of the Catholic Action Student Movement from 1978 to 1992; vice chancellor and then chancellor of the curia from 1983 to 1993; diocesan assistant of Catholic Action from 1984 to 1987; assistant to the Italian Catholic Federation of University Students until 1992; parish priest at the parish of San Concordio in Moriano, then in Massarosa, and finally in San Pietro Somaldi and San Leonardo in Lucca from 1986 to 2001.

He organized and prepared the diocesan synod and became its secretary in 1996. pro-vicar general and moderator of the curia beginning in 2001. That same year he was named a canon of the cathedral chapter of Lucca. He was later appointed vicar general.

Pope John Paul II appointed him bishop of San Miniato on 6 March 2004. He received his episcopal consecration in Lucca on 2 May from Bruno Tommasi, Archbishop of Lucca. He was installed in San Miniato on 30 May.

On 8 October 2014, Pope Francis named him bishop of Pistoia, and he was installed in his new diocese on 8 December.

On 14 October 2023, Pope Francis appointed him bishop of Pescia as well, joining the two dioceses in the person of a single bishop.

His installation in Pescia took place on 14 January 2024.

In the Italian Episcopal Conference he is Secretary of the Commission for the Laity. He is also secretary of the Tuscan Episcopal Conference. Tardelli is the Grand Prior of the Italia Centrale Appenninica Lieutenancy of the Equestrian Order of the Holy Sepulchre of Jerusalem.

Catholic Church titles
Preceded by Edoardo Ricci	Bishop of San Miniato; 6 March 2004 – 8 October 2014	Succeeded by Andrea Migliavacca
Preceded by Mansueto Bianchi	Bishop of Pistoia; 8 October 2014 – Present	Incumbent
Preceded by Roberto Filippini	Bishop of Pescia; 14 October 2023 – Present	Incumbent
