= Francesco Nori =

Italian bishop

Most Reverend Francesco Nori
- Bishop of San Miniato
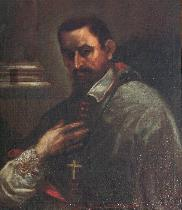
- Church: Catholic Church
- Diocese: Diocese of San Miniato
- In office: 1624–1631
- Successor: Alessandro Strozzi

Orders
- Ordination: 1603
- Consecration: 27 May 1624 by Ottavio Bandini

Personal details
- Born: 1565 Florence, Italy
- Died: 30 December 1631 (age 66) San Miniato, Italy

Francesco Nori (1565 – 30 December 1631) was a Roman Catholic prelate who served as Bishop of San Miniato (1624–1631).

== Biography ==
Francesco Nori was born in Florence, Italy in 1565 and ordained a priest in 1603. On 11 March 1624, he was appointed during the papacy of Pope Urban VIII as Bishop of San Miniato. On 27 May 1624, he was consecrated bishop by Ottavio Bandini, Cardinal-Bishop of Palestrina, with Alessandro del Caccia, Bishop of Pistoia, and Tommaso Ximenes, Bishop of Fiesole, serving as co-consecrators. He served as Bishop of San Miniato until his death on 30 December 1631.

== External links and additional sources ==
- Cheney, David M. "Diocese of San Miniato". Catholic-Hierarchy.org. (for Chronology of Bishops) ^{[self-published]}
- Chow, Gabriel. "Diocese of San Miniato (Italy)". GCatholic.org. (for Chronology of Bishops) ^{[self-published]}

Catholic Church titles
Preceded by	Bishop of San Miniato; 1624–1631	Succeeded by Alessandro Strozzi
