= Ottavio Acquaviva d'Aragona =

Ottavio Acquaviva d'Aragona may refer to:

- Ottavio Acquaviva d'Aragona (1560–1612), Italian Roman Catholic cardinal
- Ottavio Acquaviva d'Aragona (1609–1674), Italian Roman Catholic cardinal
