= Francesco Nerli =

Francesco Nerli may refer to:

- Francesco Nerli (iuniore) (1636–1708), Roman Catholic cardinal
- Francesco Nerli (seniore) (1594–1670), Roman Catholic cardinal
