= 1700 conclave =

Election of Catholic Pope Clement XI

Papal conclave October–November 1700

Dates and location
- 9 October – 23 November 1700; Apostolic Palace, Papal States

Elected pope
- Giovanni Albani; Name taken: Clement XI
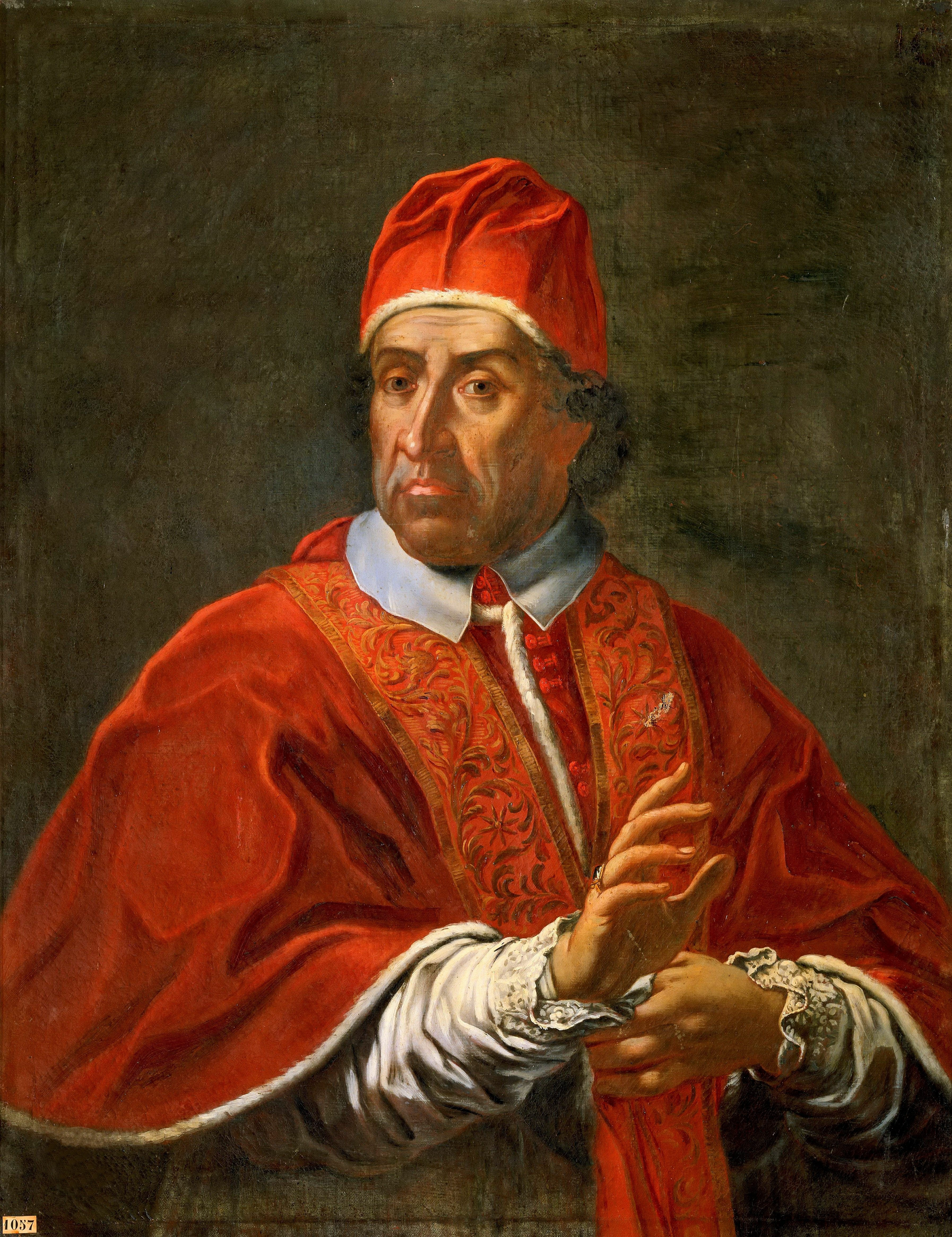

The 1700 papal conclave was convened following the death of Pope Innocent XII. It ended in the election of Cardinal Giovanni Albani as Pope Clement XI. The conclave saw a rise in the dominance of a zelanti faction in the College of Cardinals. It remained deadlocked for a month until the death of the childless Charles II of Spain. The cardinal electors anticipated that his death without a clear heir would cause a political crisis, and moved to elect a pope who would be seen as non-partisan.

== Background ==
During his pontificate Innocent XII worked to improve relations with Louis XIV of France. He reached a compromise with the French king by agreeing to the confirmation of all bishops that Louis had created since 1682 in return for the king's promise not to make them abide by the Declaration of the Clergy of France.

The Habsburg Charles II of Spain was dying at this time and had no children. At Charles' request, Innocent advised that the throne pass to Philip of Anjou, grandson of Louis XIV, due to the close kinship between Louis and Charles. Philip succeeding to the Spanish throne was seen as a threat to the balance of power by other European nations, leading to the War of the Spanish Succession upon Charles' death, which took place six weeks after Innocent's own.

Innocent XII's age and health had been a topic of conversation among European courts and cardinals, and when he became sick in November 1699 speculation as to the next conclave became more earnest. Despite this, France was the only great power to have a clear policy regarding the next papal conclave. Both Spain and the Holy Roman Empire were bogged down in extensive conversations in their capitals which caused a delay in their ambassadors receiving orders.

== Conclave ==
Fifty-eight cardinals were present on 9 October when the conclave began. Since Charles II was dying at this time, Spain's cardinal electors were unsure of how they should vote, and they did not work closely with electors that were loyal to the Holy Roman Emperor. From the beginning, it was clear that the impending death of Charles II was likely to cause a lengthy conclave, because the next pope would be expected to respond to the anticipated political crisis in Spain following Charles' imminent death.

Of the fifty-eight cardinals present at the conclave, thirty-one were considered to be a part of the zelanti, with Innocent XII having created eighteen members of the College of Cardinals who were counted as part of this faction. The other two main factions were those loyal to the Holy Roman Emperor, who originally had only two cardinals, but eventually increased to four, and the French, who had five cardinals in their camp.

Galeazzo Marescotti, a member of the zelanti, was the first serious candidate proposed two weeks into the conclave. He was acceptable to the Spanish, but was opposed by the French because they wanted a new pope who was not strong. Bandino Panciatici was suggested by Pietro Ottoboni, but he was not supported by secular monarchs because he had supported giving benefices to nominees who were independent of the secular authorities. Giacomo Antonio Morigia was acceptable to the secular rulers, but was opposed by the zelanti for lacking governing experience in addition to not being firm or having the energy required. Following the proposal of these candidates, others came up as well, but were quickly rejected.

== Election of Clement XI ==
The conclave remained deadlocked until the electors were informed of Charles II's death in November. The electors present understood that with Charles' death, the next pope would need to be politically impartial, so a member of the zelanti was preferred. Giovanni Albani, who had drafted the bull outlawing nepotism, soon became the leading candidate for the papacy.

The French were initially opposed to Albani's election, but they quickly dropped their opposition to him. He was elected unanimously on 23 November 1700. He was unsure whether he should accept the papacy because he had nephews who he suspected would be angry if he followed the bull on nepotism. He was eventually convinced to accept the papacy by theologians who told him that not accepting a unanimous election would not be following the Holy Spirit.

Albani had been created a cardinal deacon in 1690 by Alexander VIII, but he did not receive ordination to the priesthood until shortly before the conclave began. Albani was not a bishop, and had to receive episcopal consecration after his election before he could be crowned pope. He had been elected on the feast day of Pope Clement I, and took the name of Clement XI to honour the saint. At fifty-one, Albani was younger than any other pope who had been elected in almost two centuries. As Albani was the candidate of the zelanti in this conclave, his election represented a success for them.
