= Pope Innocent XII =

Head of the Catholic Church from 1691 to 1700

- Bishop of Rome
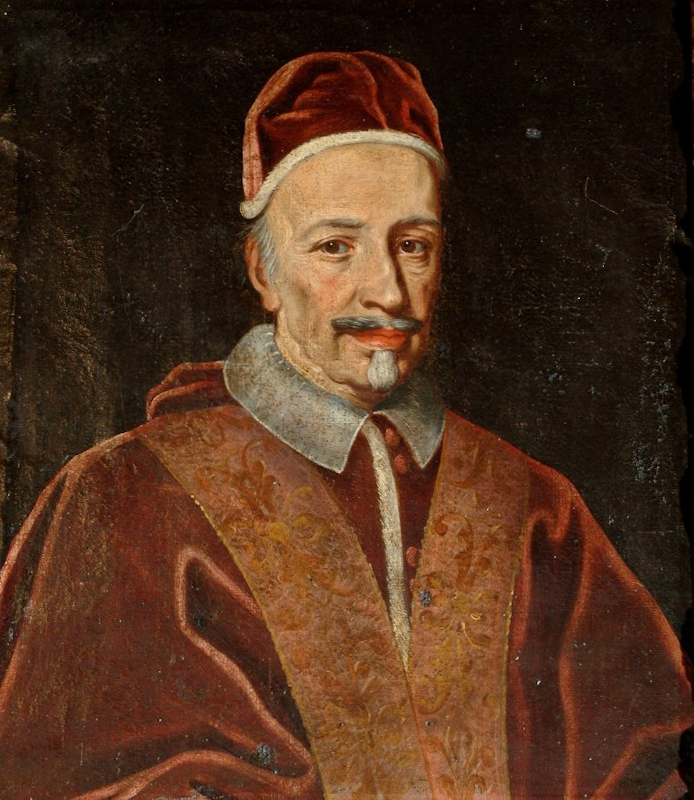
- Portrait by Antonio Zanchi, c. 1691-99
- Church: Catholic Church
- Papacy began: 12 July 1691
- Papacy ended: 27 September 1700
- Predecessor: Alexander VIII
- Successor: Clement XI
- Previous posts: Titular Archbishop of Larissa (1652–1671); Apostolic Nuncio to Poland (1660–1668); Apostolic Nuncio to Austria (1668–1671); Archbishop-Bishop of Lecce (1671–1681); Archbishop-Bishop of Faenza (1682–1686); Archbishop of Naples (1686–1691); Cardinal-Priest of San Pancrazio (1681–1691)

Orders
- Ordination: c. 1643
- Consecration: 27 October 1652 by Marcantonio Franciotti
- Created cardinal: 1 September 1681 by Innocent XI

Personal details
- Born: Antonio Pignatelli; 13 March 1615 Spinazzola, Kingdom of Naples
- Died: 27 September 1700 (aged 85) Rome, Papal States
- Buried: Vatican Grottoes, St. Peter's Basilica
- Coat of arms

Papal styles of Pope Innocent XII
- Reference style: His Holiness
- Spoken style: Your Holiness
- Religious style: Holy Father
- Posthumous style: None

Pope Innocent XII (Latin: Innocentius XII; Italian: Innocenzo XII; 13 March 1615 – 27 September 1700), born Antonio Pignatelli, was head of the Catholic Church and leader of the Papal States from 12 July 1691 until his death in September 1700.

He took a hard stance against nepotism in the Church, continuing the policies of Pope Innocent XI, who started the battle against nepotism but which did not gain traction under Pope Alexander VIII. To that end, he issued a papal bull strictly forbidding it. The pope also used this bull to ensure that no revenue or land could be bestowed on relatives.

== Biography ==
=== Early life ===
Antonio Pignatelli was born on 13 March 1615 in Spinazzola (now in Apulia) to one of the most aristocratic families of the Kingdom of Naples, which had included several Viceroys and ministers of the crown. He was the fourth of five children of Francesco Pignatelli, 4th Marquess of Spinazzola, and wife Porzia Carafa, 1st Princess of Minervino. His siblings were Marzio, Ludovico, Fabrizio and Paola Maria. His mother was related to Pope Paul IV.

He was educated at the Collegio Romano in Rome where he earned a doctorate in both canon and civil law.

=== Diplomatic career ===
At the age of 20 he became an official of the court of Pope Urban VIII. Pignatelli was the Referendary of the Apostolic Signatura and served as the governor of Fano and Viterbo. Later he went to Malta where he served as an inquisitor from 1646 to 1649, and then governor of Perugia. Shortly after this, he received his priestly ordination.

=== Episcopate and cardinalate ===
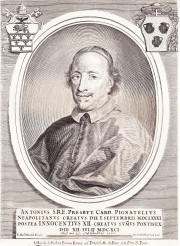
Cardinal Antonio Pignatelli

Pignatelli was made Titular Archbishop of Larissa in 1652 and received episcopal consecration in Rome. He served as the Apostolic Nuncio to Poland from 1660 to 1668 and later to Austria from 1668 to 1671. He was transferred to Lecce in 1671. Pope Innocent XI appointed him as the Cardinal-Priest of San Pancrazio in 1681 and then moved him to the see of Faenza in 1682. He was moved to his final post before the papacy, as Archbishop of Naples in 1686.

== Papacy ==
=== Papal election ===
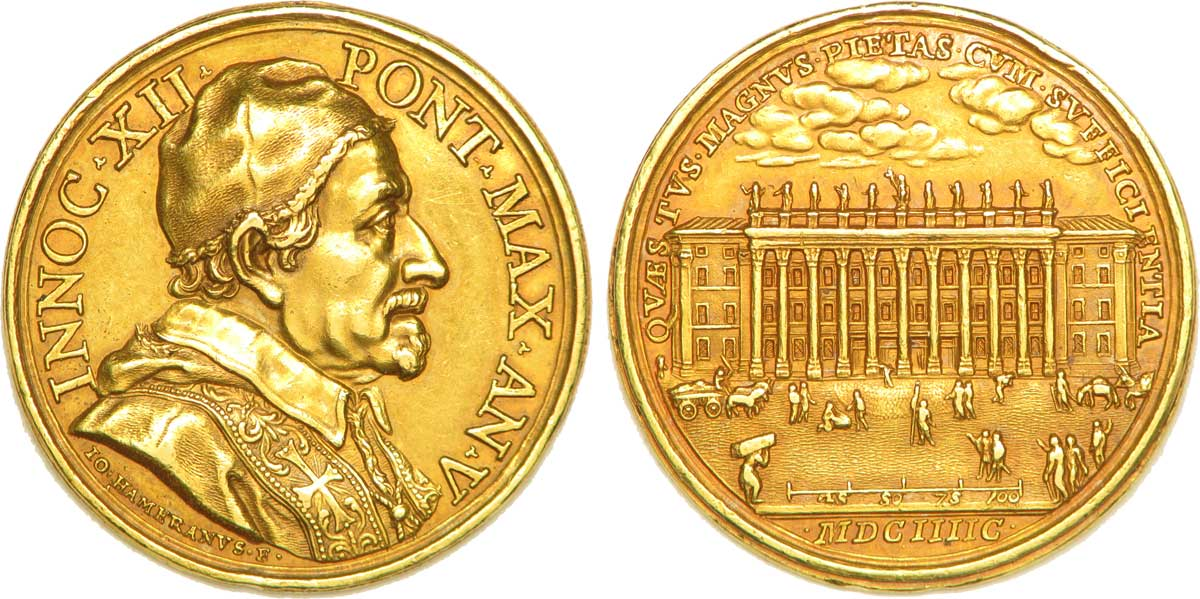
Innocent XII, 1695.

Pope Alexander VIII died in 1691 and the College of Cardinals assembled to hold a conclave to select his successor. Factions loyal to the Kingdom of France, Spain and the broader Holy Roman Empire failed to agree on a consensus candidate.

After five months, Cardinal Pignatelli emerged as a compromise candidate between the cardinals of France and those of the Holy Roman Empire, particularly after Cardinal Gregorio Barbarigo was no longer considered a viable candidate for the papacy. Having received 53 out of 61 votes, Pignatelli took his new name in honour of Pope Innocent XI and was crowned on 15 July 1691 by the protodeacon, Cardinal Urbano Sacchetti. He took possession of the Basilica of Saint John Lateran on 13 April 1692.

=== Actions ===
Immediately after his election on 12 July 1691, Innocent XII declared his opposition to the nepotism which had afflicted the reigns of previous popes. The following year he issued the papal bull, Romanum decet Pontificem, banning the curial office of the Cardinal-Nephew and prohibiting popes from bestowing estates, offices, or revenues on any relative. Further, only one relative (and only "if otherwise suitable") was to be raised to the cardinalate.

At the same time he sought to check the simony in the practices of the Apostolic Chamber and to that end introduced a simpler and more economical manner of life into his court. Innocent XII said that "the poor were his nephews" and compared his public beneficence to the nepotism of many predecessors.

That same year he invited Marcello Malpighi to Rome to serve as his personal physician and offered him the position of Professor of Medicine at the Sapienza University of Rome. Malpighi introduced his Roman colleagues to the use of the microscope.

Innocent XII also introduced various reforms into the States of the Church including the Forum Innocentianum, designed to improve the administration of justice dispensed by the Church. In 1693 he compelled French bishops to retract the four propositions relating to the Gallican Liberties which had been formulated by the assembly of 1682.

In 1699, he decided in favour of Jacques-Benigne Bossuet in that prelate's controversy with Fénelon about the Explication des Maximes des Saints sur la Vie Intérieure of the latter. Innocent XII's pontificate also differed greatly from his predecessors' because of his leanings towards France instead of the Habsburg monarchy; the first in the 20 years following France's failure to have its candidate elected in 1644 and 1655.

==== Consistories ====
Innocent XII created 30 cardinals in four consistories; two of those he elevated were those he reserved in pectore.

==== Canonizations and beatifications ====
Innocent XII canonized Saint Zita of Lucca on 5 September 1696. He beatified Augustin Kažotić on 17 July 1700 and approved the cultus of Angela of Foligno in 1693. He also beatified Osanna Andreasi on 24 November 1694, Mary de Cervellione on 13 February 1692, Jane of Portugal on 31 December 1692, Umiliana de' Cerchi on 24 July 1694, Helen Enselmini on 29 October 1695, and Delphine of Glandèves in 1694.

=== Death ===
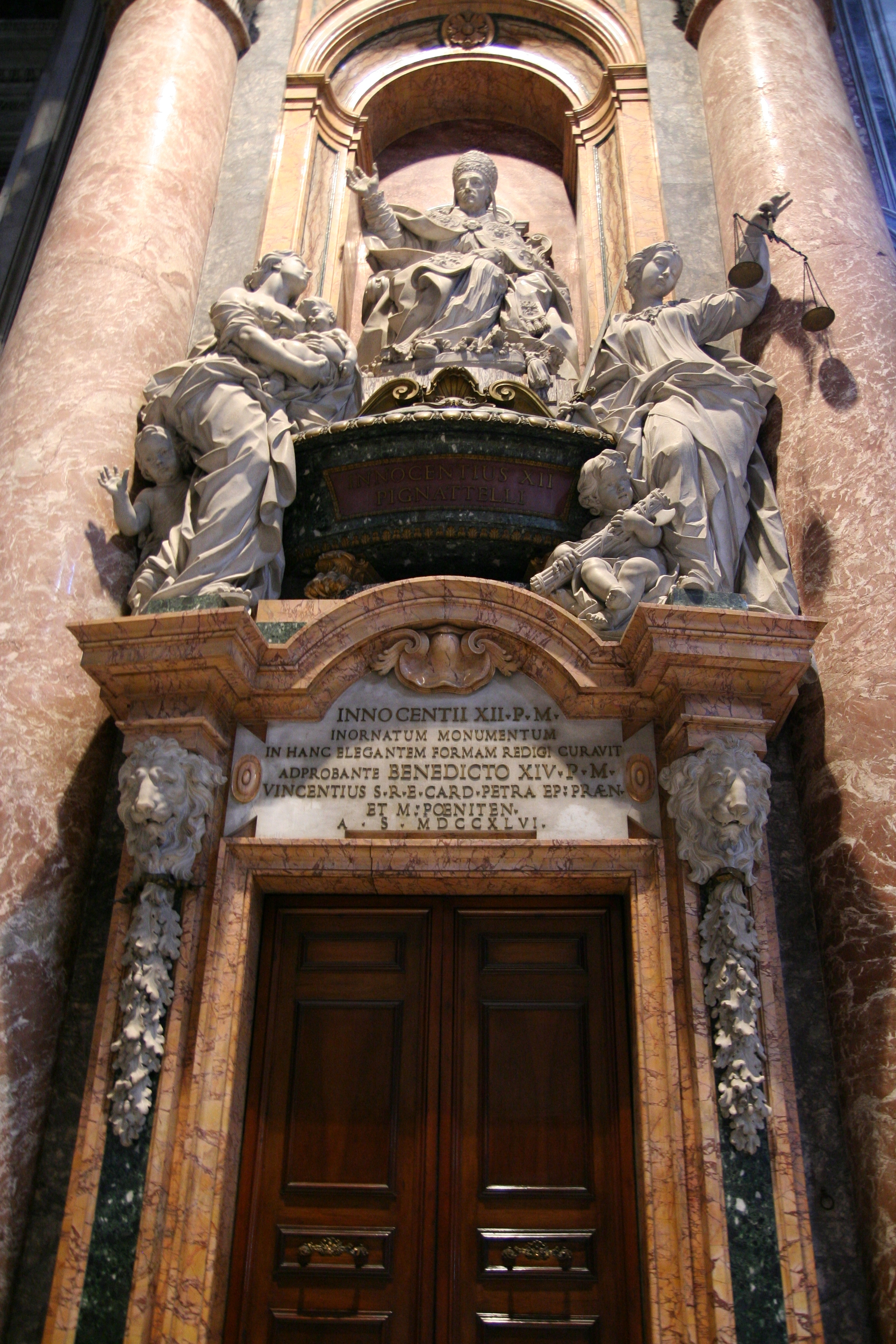
The tomb and monument to Innocent XII in Saint Peter's Basilica.

Innocent XII was already considerably ill on 25 December 1699 with gout (a rheumatic disease) and was therefore unable to attend the solemn opening of the Holy Door at Saint Peter's Basilica to mark the beginning of the Jubilee for 1700, hence, Cardinal Emmanuel-Théodose de La Tour d'Auvergne represented the pontiff in the solemn celebration. On Easter Sunday in 1700, the seriously ill pontiff gave a blessing from his balcony to the large crowds outside of the Quirinal Palace. Despite his illness, he named three new cardinals in June 1700.

Innocent died on 27 September 1700 and was succeeded in the next conclave by Pope Clement XI (1700–21). His tomb in Saint Peter's Basilica was sculpted by Filippo della Valle. Innocent is the most recent pope to not be clean shaven.

== In fiction ==
Innocent appears as one of the narrators in Robert Browning's long poem The Ring and the Book (1869), based on the true story of the pope's intervention in a historical murder trial in Rome during his papacy.

== See also ==
- Cardinals created by Innocent XII
- Papal conclave, 1691
- Papal conclave, 1700

== Bibliography ==
- Ago, R. (1994), "La carriera curiale di Antonio Pignatelli," in: Riforme, religione e politica durante il pontificato di Innocenzo XII (1691-1700), pp. 23–30.
- Ago, Renata (2000), "Innocenzo XII," Enciclopedia dei Papi (Treccani: 2000). (in Italian)
- Olszewski, Edward J. (2004). Cardinal Pietro Ottoboni (1667-1740) and the Vatican Tomb of Pope Alexander VIII. American Philosophical Society. ISBN 0-87169-252-X.
- Pastor, Ludwig (1891). The history of the popes from the close of the Middle Ages Volume 32. London: Kegan, Paul, Trench, Trubner.
- Pellegrino, B. (ed.). Riforme, religione e politica durante il pontificato di Innocenzo XII (1691-1700) Lecce 1994. (in Italian) [collection of studies]
- Spedicato, M. (1994), "L'episcopato di Antonio Pignatelli a Lecce (1671-82): un governo pastorale a distanza?," in: Riforme, religione e politica, pp. 31–44. (in Italian)

== Sources ==
Catholic Church titles
Preceded by Pietro Vidoni	Cardinal-Priest of San Pancrazio; 1681 – 1691	Succeeded by Bandino Panciatichi
Preceded by Innico Caracciolo	Archbishop of Naples; 1686 – 1691	Succeeded by Giacomo Cantelmo
Preceded by Alexander VIII	Pope; 12 July 1691 – 27 September 1700	Succeeded by Clement XI
