= San Bartolomeo all'Isola =

Roman Catholic basilica, a landmark of Rome, Italy

Basilica of St. Bartholomew on the Island
- Basilica S. Bartholomaei in Insula
- Basilica di San Bartolomeo all'Isola
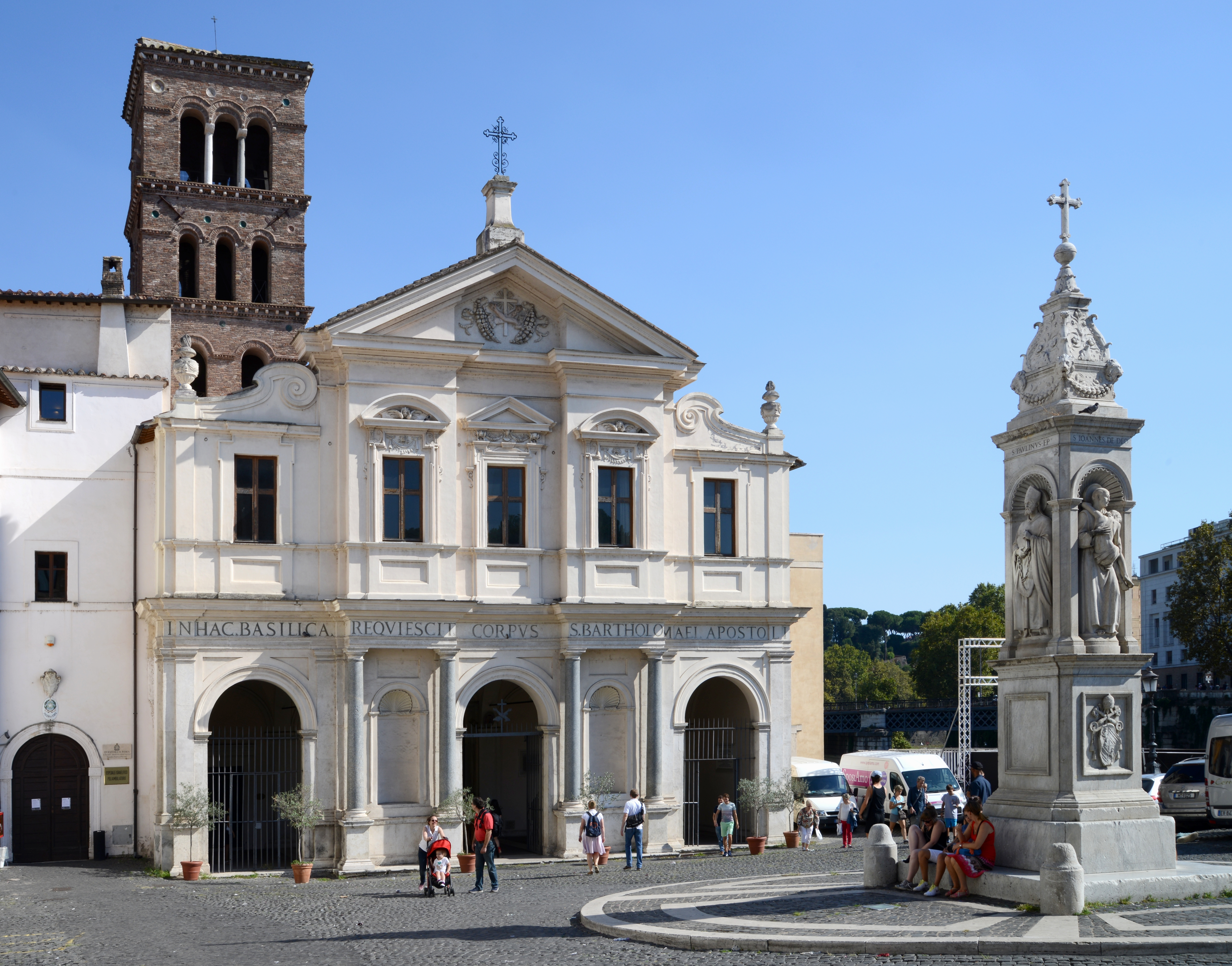
- Façade of San Bartolomeo all'Isola on the Tiber Island
- Click on the map for a fullscreen view
- 41°53′25″N 12°28′42″E
- Location: Tiber Island, Rome
- Country: Italy
- Denomination: Roman Catholic
- Tradition: Oriental rite
- Website: www.sanbartolomeo.org

History
- Status: Minor basilica, Rectory church, titular church
- Dedication: Bartholomew the Apostle
- Consecrated: 10th Century

Architecture
- Architectural type: Church
- Style: Romanesque, Baroque
- Completed: 1644

Specifications
- Length: 45 metres (148 ft)
- Width: 22 metres (72 ft)

Administration
- District: Lazio
- Province: Rome

The Basilica of St. Bartholomew on the Island (Italian: Basilica di San Bartolomeo all'Isola, Latin: Basilica S. Bartholomaei in Insula) is a titular minor basilica, located in Rome, Italy. It was founded in 998 by Otto III, Holy Roman Emperor and contains the putative relics of St. Bartholomew the Apostle. It is located on Tiber Island, on the site of the former temple of Aesculapius, which had cleansed the island of its former ill-repute among the Romans and established its reputation as a hospital, continued under Christian auspices today.

Its cardinal priest has been Cardinal Blase Cupich since 19 November 2016.

== History ==
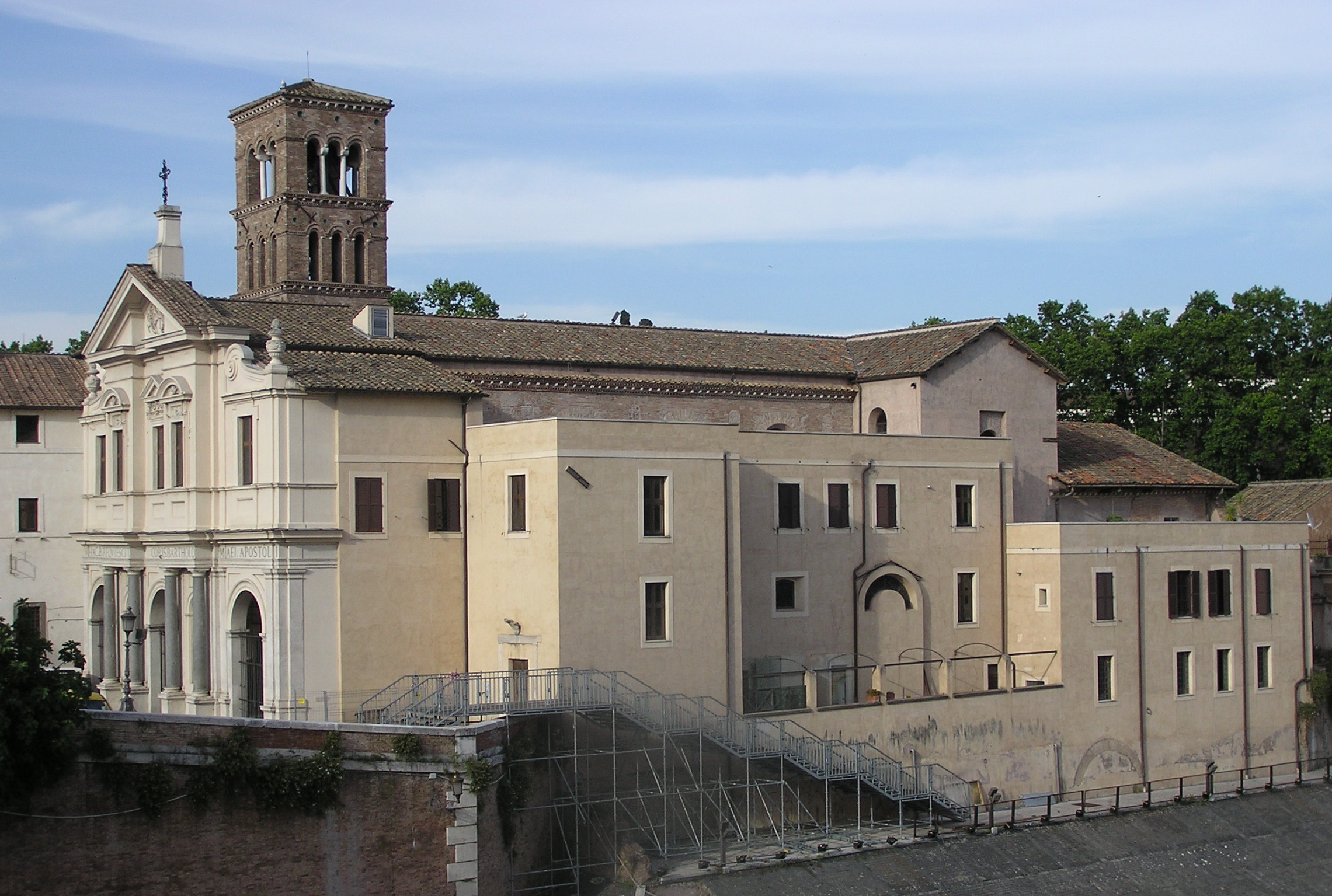
Basilica di San Bartolomeo all'Isola, with the Torre dei Caetani behind

In Roman times, the Temple of Aesculapius stood on the site of the modern church. The entire Isola Tiberina had actually been covered in marble in an effort to make the island look like a ship. The prow can still be seen today.

Emperor Otto built this church over the temple's ruins on the eastern side (downstream end) of the island. It was initially dedicated to Adalbert of Prague.

A portion of the relics of St. Bartholomew was given by Otto II to Rome in 983. The relics were sent to Rome from Benevento, where they had arrived in 838 from Lipari. They are located within an ancient Roman porphyry sarcophagus with lions' heads, under the main altar. The marble wellhead bears the figures of the Savior, Adalbert, Bartholomew, and Otto III. The association with Aesculapius, and therefore healing, in time caused Bartholomew's name to become associated with medicine and hospitals.

The church was renovated by Pope Paschal II in 1113 and again in 1180. The church was badly damaged by a flood in 1557 and was reconstructed, with its present Baroque façade, in 1624, to designs of Orazio Torriani commissioned by Cardinal Trescio. Further restorations were undertaken in 1852. The interior of the church preserves fourteen ancient Roman columns and two lion supports that date from the earliest reconstruction of the basilica.

The inscriptions found in S. Bartolomeo, a valuable source illustrating the history of the Basilica, have been collected and published by Vincenzo Forcella.

In 2000, San Bartolomeo was dedicated by Pope John Paul II to the memory of the new martyrs of the 20th and 21st century.

== Exterior ==
In the center of the piazzetta before the church is a four-sided guglia with saints in niches by the sculptor Ignazio Jacometti, erected here in 1869.

The 12th-century tower near the church, the Torre dei Caetani, is all that remains of the medieval castello erected on the island by the Pierleoni.

== Interior ==
San Bartolomeo houses the memorial to new martyrs of the 20th and 21st century, which was dedicated by Pope John Paul II in 2000. This memorial is taken care of by the Community of Sant'Egidio, who also painted the icon on the main altar. One of the relics that are kept as part of the memorial is the piece of rock that was used in 1984 to kill Blessed Jerzy Popiełuszko.

== List of Cardinal priests ==
San Bartolomeo all'Isola was established as a titular church, the titulus (Titulus S. Bartholomaei in Insula) of a cardinal priest by Pope Leo X on 6 July 1517. The title is held by Cardinal Blase J. Cupich, Archbishop of Chicago.

- Aegidius de Viterbo (Italy) , (1517)
- Domenico Giacobazzi (Italy) , (1517–1519)
- vacant (1519–1533)
- Jean Le Veneur (France) , (1533–1543)
- Jacques d'Annebaut (France) , (1547–1548)
- Bartolomé de la Cueva y Toledo (Italy) , (1551–1555)
- Fulvio Giulio della Corgna (Italy) , (1555–1557)
- vacant (1557–1562)
- Antoine Perrenot de Granvelle (France) , (1562–1568)
- Diego de Espinosa (Spain) , (1568)
- Giulio Antonio Santorio (Italy) , (1570–1595)
- Francesco Maria Tarugi (Italy) , (1596–1602)
- Filippo Spinelli (Italy) , (1604–1608)
- Michelangelo Tonti (Italy) , (1608–1621)
- Gabriel Trejo y Paniagua (Spain) , (1621–1630)
- Agostino Spinola Basadone (Spain) , (1631–1649)
- vacant (1649–1654)
- Ottavio Acquaviva d'Aragona (iuniore) (Italy) , (1654–1658)
- vacant (1658–1670)
- Francesco Nerli (seniore) (Italy) , (1670)
- Johann Eberhard Graf Neidhardt (Austria) , (1672–1679)
- vacant (1679–1696)
- Giovanni Giacomo Cavallerini (Italy) , (1696–1699)
- Niccolò Radulovich (Italy) , (1700–1702)
- vacant (1702–1707)
- Francesco Acquaviva (Italy) . (1707–1709)
- vacant (1709–1721)
- Juan Álvaro Cienfuegos Villazón (Hungary) (1721–1739)
- vacant (1739–1782)
- József Batthyány (Hungary) , (1782–1799)
- vacant (1799–1803)
- Pietro Francesco Galeffi (Italy) , (1803–1820)
- Bonaventura Gazzola (Italy) , (1824–1832)
- Engelbert Sterckx (Belgium) , (1838–1867)
- vacant (1867–1874)
- János Simor (Hungary) , (1874–1891)
- Mario Mocenni (Italy) , (1893–1894)
- Egidio Mauri (Italy) , (1894–1895)
- Johann Evangelist Haller (Austria) , (1896–1900)
- Bartolomeo Bacilieri (Italy) , (1901–1923)
- Enrico Gasparri (Italy) , (1925–1933)
- Carlo Salotti (Italy) , (1936–1939)
- Gregorio Pietro Agagianian (Lebanon) (1946–1970)
- Aníbal Muñoz Duque (Colombia) , (1973–1987)
- Mario Revollo Bravo (Colombia) , (1988–1995)
- Francis Eugene George (United States) , (1998–2015)
- Blase Joseph Cupich (United States) , (2016–Present)

| Preceded by Santa Balbina | Landmarks of Rome; San Bartolomeo all'Isola | Succeeded by Santi Bonifacio ed Alessio |
