= Diocese of Pescia =

Roman Catholic diocese in Italy

Coordinates: 43.9000°N 10.6833°E

Diocese of Pescia Dioecesis Pisciensis

Catholic
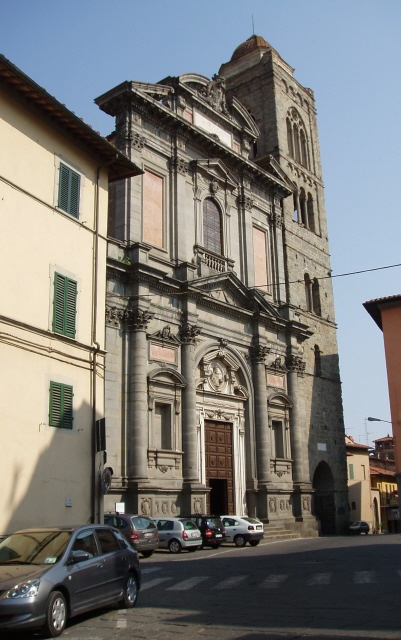
- Pescia Cathedral

Location
- Country: Italy
- Ecclesiastical province: Pisa

Statistics
- Area: 224 km^{2} (86 sq mi)
- Population: Total; Catholics: (as of 2021); 120,950 (est.); 111,460 (guess)
- Parishes: 41

Information
- Denomination: Catholic Church
- Rite: Roman Rite
- Established: 15 April 1519 (507 years ago)
- Cathedral: Cattedrale di Maria SS. Assunta e S. Giovanni Battista
- Secular priests: 48 (diocesan); 23 (Religious Orders); 6 Permanent Deacons

Current leadership
- Pope: Leo XIV
- Bishop-Elect: Augusto Mascagna
- Metropolitan Archbishop: Saverio Cannistrà, O.C.D.
- Bishops emeritus: Roberto Filippini

Map

Website
- www.diocesidipescia.it

The Diocese of Pescia (Latin: Dioecesis Pisciensis) is a Latin diocese of the Catholic Church in Tuscany, about 41 miles (66 km) west of Florence. It is a suffragan of the Archdiocese of Pisa.

On 14 October 2023, with the appointment of Fausto Tardelli as bishop, the Diocese of Pescia was united with the Diocese of Pistoia in the person of a single bishop.

== History ==
=== Provostship ===
As a favor to his Datary, Baldassare Turini, who was a cleric and notary of the diocese of Lucca, and Lorenzo de Cecchis, who was a Doctor in utroque iure and parish priest of the church of S. Maria Maggiore in Pescia, Pope Leo X, in the bull "Sacri Apostolatus" of 15 April 1519, withdrew Pescia from the Diocese of Lucca, raising it to the dignity of a prelacy nullius, and made it directly dependent upon the Holy See (Papacy). The territory was to become a Provostship, and De Cecchis was named the first Provost. A corporation of Canons. or Chapter, was established, with several dignities: the Provost, the Archdeacon, the Archpriest, the Dean, and the Primicerius. The territory of the new prelacy was to include all the churches in the Val di Nievole and the Valle Ariana. The Provost was assigned both ecclesiastical and civil jurisdiction (both of civil cases and criminal cases) in the Provostship.

On 23 September 1519, Leo X issued a second bull, "Inter Caetera", in which he authorized the Bishop of Pistoia, the Bishop of Forlì, and the Abbot of Vallombrosa, to perform the canonical investiture of the new Provost, Lorenzo de Cecchis. He also fixed the number of Canons of the collegiate church at twelve, and specified that the dignities were to be the Provost, the Archdeacon, the Rector of the church of S. Stefano in Pescia (who would have the title Prior), the Rector of Ss. Matteo e Colombano in Pietrobono (with the title of Archpriest), the Dean, the Treasurer, and the Primicerius.

Pope Leo X also granted to the provosts the right to use the vestments proper to a bishop, including mitre, staff, and cross, within the confines of their provostship. This was confirmed by Pope Urban VIII in the bull "Dilecti filii" of 25 February 1635, to which the pope added the right to wear the cappa magna and the mozzetta, also within the confines of his jurisdiction.

A synod was held in the Provostship on 25–27 April 1694 by the Provost, Msgr. Benedetto Falconcini (1694-1704). The acts of the synod were published.

=== Diocese ===
In a bull of 17 March 1726, Pescia was established as a diocese by Pope Benedict XIII, and made suffragan of (subordinate to) Pisa. The first bishop was, as was customary, the last Provost of the Collegiate Chapter, Paolo Antonio Pesenti, who had been in office since 1707. He was named Bishop-elect on 17 March 1727, but he died on 1 August 1728, before he was consecrated a bishop.

Santa Maria Maggiore, dedicated to the taking up of the body of the Virgin Mary into heaven (Assumption), is referred to in documents as early as 991. The original church of the parish of Pescia, S. Maria Maggiore, which had been elevated to the status of a collegiate church, needed to be replaced. An enlarged church on the same site as the old church, and incorporating some of its elements, was constructed at the end of the 17th century, to designs by the Florentine architect, Antonio Ferri. The campanile is of the 14th century, though its uppermost part is of the late 18th century.

In 1742, the cathedral Chapter was composed of seven dignities and twelve Canons. The city of Pescia had about 5,000 inhabitants.

In 1784, with the cooperation of Grand Duke Leopold I of Tuscany, the diocesan seminary was opened.

By 1833, the population of the entire diocese of Pescia had risen to a total of 49,890 persons.

== Bishops of Pescia ==
- Bartolomeo Pucci Franceschi (1728–1737)
- Francesco Gaetano Incontri (1738–1741)
- Donato Maria Arcangeli (1742–1772)
- Francesco Vincenti (1773–1803)
- Giulio Rossi (1804–1833)
- Giovanni Battista Rossi (1834–1837)
- Vincenzo Menchi (1839–1843)
- Pietro Niccolò Forti (1847–1854)
- Giovanni Antonio Benini (Bedini) (1855–1896)
- Giulio Matteoli (1896–1898)
- Donato Velluti Zati di San Clemente (1898–1907 Resigned)
- Giulio Serafini (1907)
- Angelo Simonetti (1907–1950)
- Dino Luigi Romoli, O.P. (1951–1977 Retired)
- Giovanni Bianchi (1977–1993 Retired)
- Giovanni De Vivo (1993–2015 Died)
- Roberto Filippini (2015–2023 Retired) (Note: On 25 November 2015, Pope Francis appointed Roberto Filippini, S.T.L., a priest of Pisa, bishop of Pescia. Filippini was born in Vinci, Florence, Italy, on 6 June 1948. A graduate of the seminary of Pisa, he completed his graduate theological studies at the Almo Collegio Capranica in Rome, and attended the Pontifical Gregorian University as well as the Pontifical Biblical Institute, obtaining the Licentiate in Sacred Theology and in Sacred Scripture. He served as a Parochial Vicar (Associate Pastor) from 1975 to 1978 and taught at the Seminary of Pisa. He was a parish priest in Calignola, Pisa; and San Martino. In 1996, he was appointed President of the Studio Teologico Interdiocesano di Camaiore (seminary) in Lucca. From 1999 to September 2015, Filippini was rector of the Seminary "Santa Caterina" in Pisa, and a prison chaplain in Pisa. He has also been a professor of Fundamental Theology and Sacred Scripture at the Higher Institute of Religious Sciences of Blessed Nicholas Steno, in Pisa, and at the School of Theological Education.)
- Fausto Tardelli (2023–2026 Retired)
- Augusto Mascagna (2026–Present)

== Books ==
- Gams, Pius Bonifatius (1873). Series episcoporum Ecclesiae catholicae: quotquot innotuerunt a beato Petro apostolo. Ratisbon: Typis et Sumptibus Georgii Josephi Manz. p. 762. (Use with caution; obsolete)
- Ritzler, Remigius; Sefrin, Pirminus (1952). Hierarchia catholica medii et recentis aevi (in Latin). Vol. Tomus V (1667-1730). Patavii: Messagero di S. Antonio.
- Ritzler, Remigius; Sefrin, Pirminus (1958). Hierarchia catholica medii et recentis aevi. Vol. Tomus VI (1730-1799). Patavii: Messagero di S. Antonio.
- Ritzler, Remigius; Sefrin, Pirminus (1968). Hierarchia Catholica medii et recentioris aevi (in Latin). Vol. VII (1800–1846). Monasterii: Libreria Regensburgiana.
- Remigius Ritzler; Pirminus Sefrin (1978). Hierarchia catholica Medii et recentioris aevi (in Latin). Vol. VIII (1846–1903). Il Messaggero di S. Antonio.
- Pięta, Zenon (2002). Hierarchia catholica medii et recentioris aevi (in Latin). Vol. IX (1903–1922). Padua: Messagero di San Antonio. ISBN 978-88-250-1000-8.

=== Studies ===
- Ansaldi, Giuseppe (1872). Cenni biografici dei personaggi illustri della città di Pescia e suoi dintorni (in Italian). Pescia: Tip. Vannini. p. 1.
- Banti, Ottavio (2003). Pescia: la città e il Vescovato : nella bolla del papa Benedetto XIII del 17 marzo 1727 (in Italian). Pisa: ETS. ISBN 978-88-467-0662-1.
- Cappelletti, Giuseppe (1864). Le chiese d'Italia (in Italian). Vol. decimotto (18). Venezia: G. Antonelli. pp. 321–364.
- Nucci, Ermenegildo (1937). I vescovi di Pescia dall'anno 1726 al 1908 (in Italian). Pescia: Stamperia G. Franchi.
- Repetti, Emanuele (1841). Dizionario geografico fisico storico della Toscana contenente la descrizione di tutti i luoghi del Granducato, Ducato di Lucca Garfagnana e Lunigiana (in Italian). Vol. IV (P-R). Firenze: Allegrini e Mazzoni. pp. 113–134.
- Storia della Val di Nievole dall'origine di Pescia fino all'anno 1818 (in Italian). Pistoia: Cino. 1846.
