= Andrea Franchi =

Roman Catholic

Blessed Andrea Franchi O.P.
- Bishop Emeritus of Pistoia
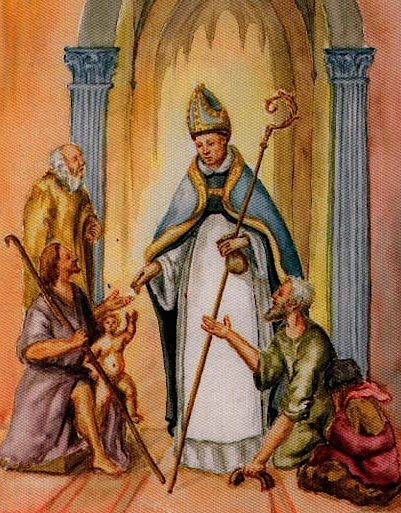
- Church: Roman Catholic Church
- Diocese: Pistoia
- See: Pistoia
- Appointed: 1382
- Term ended: 29 May 1400
- Predecessor: Giovanni Vivenzi
- Successor: Matteo Diamanti

Orders
- Consecration: 1382
- Rank: Bishop

Personal details
- Born: Andrea Franchi; 1335 Pistoia, Republic of Florence
- Died: 26 May 1401 (aged 66) Pistoia, Republic of Florence

Sainthood
- Feast day: 26 May
- Venerated in: Roman Catholic Church
- Beatified: 21 November 1921; Saint Peter's Basilica, Kingdom of Italy by Pope Benedict XV
- Attributes: Dominican habit; Crozier

Andrea Franchi, OP (1335 - 26 May 1401) was an Italian Catholic member of the Order of Preachers who served as Bishop of Pistoia from 1382 to 1400. He was a noted preacher and evangelist with a deep commitment to the poor of his diocese. The confirmation of his cultus (or popular devotion) allowed Pope Benedict XV to confirm Franchi's beatification in 1921.

== Life ==
Andrea Franchi was born in Pistoia in 1335 as the third of four children that included Francesco di Franco di Simone Franchi as well as Bartolomeo - an advisor of Pope Urban VI and Pope Boniface IX - and Luca (who joined Franchi in the order).

Franchi studied at the Dominican convent of Santa Maria Novella in Pistoia and joined the Dominicans at the age of fourteen in 1359. He was later ordained to the priesthood and became a noted preacher and evangelist. He also served as a teacher in Rome of both philosophical and theological studies. Franchi served from 1369 until 1381 as the prior of the Dominican houses in his home of Pistoia as well as Lucca and Orvieto.

Franchi became the Bishop of Pistoia in 1382 after Pope Urban VI appointed him to that position; the new bishop received his episcopal consecration sometime in 1382. He administered to the poor and to the ill and gained the moniker of the "Father of the Poor". But ill health forced him to - on 29 May 1400 - relinquish his episcopal see, and he returned to his Pistoia convent where he remained for the final months of his life.

Franchi died in 1401. He was interred in the church of San Domenico in Pistoia, and his remains were deemed to be incorrupt after their exhumation in 1613 - a sweet odour was said to have emanated from his remains following the exhumation.

== Beatification ==
Franchi received formal beatification from Pope Benedict XV on 21 November 1921 after the pontiff confirmed the late bishop's 'cultus' (or popular devotion and following).
