= Fulvio Passerini =

Italian Roman Catholic prelate

The Most Reverend Fulvio Passerini
- Bishop Emeritus of Pistoia
- Appointed: 21 June 1591
- Installed: 1599
- Term ended: 1599
- Predecessor: Ottavio Abbiosi
- Successor: Alessandro del Caccia
- Previous post: Bishop of Avellino (1591-1599)

Orders
- Ordination: 1591
- Consecration: 21 July 1591 by Cardinal Tolomeo Gallio

Personal details
- Born: 1549 Cortona, Italy
- Died: 1599 (aged 49–50) Pistoia, Italy

Styles of Fulvio Passerini
- Reference style: His Excellency; The Most Reverend
- Spoken style: Your Excellency
- Religious style: Bishop

Fulvio Passerini (1549 – 11 December 1599) was an Italian Catholic prelate.

== Biography ==
Passerini was born in 1549 in Cortona, Tuscany, Italy. He obtained a doctorate in both civil law and canon law. He was ordained in 1591. On 21 June 1591, Pope Gregory XIV appointed him Bishop of Avellino and he received his episcopal consecration on 21 July at St. Agata Church, Rome, by Cardinal Tolomeo Gallio, the bishop of Frascati. Co-consecrators were Bishops Giovanni D'Amato, Bishop Emeritus of Minori and Pietro Cedolini, Bishop of Lesina.

During his episcopate, he chose Augustinian and Conventual monks as teachers for the diocesan seminary. In 1598, he elevated St. Ippolisto church in Atripalda to the rank of a collegiate church. On 11 March 1599, Pope Clement VIII transferred him to the see of Pistoia, of which he took possession on 27 June of the same year. During his brief episcopate there, he was reported to have refused celebrating the feast of the Nativity of Saint Zeno on 8 December and instead went to his rural episcopal residence, where he died three days later as a result of a fall.
