= Alessandro Strozzi (bishop of San Miniato) =

Roman Catholic prelate

Most Reverend Alessandro Strozzi
- Bishop of San Miniato
- Church: Catholic Church
- Diocese: Diocese of San Miniato
- In office: 1632–1648
- Predecessor: Francesco Nori
- Successor: Angelo Pichi
- Previous post: Bishop of Andria (1626–1632)

Personal details
- Died: 28 August 1648 San Miniato, Italy

Alessandro Strozzi (died 28 August 1648) was a Roman Catholic prelate who served as Bishop of San Miniato (1632–1648) and Bishop of Andria (1626–1632).

== Biography ==
On 4 May 1626, Alessandro Strozzi was appointed during the papacy of Pope Urban VIII as Bishop of Andria. On 8 March 1632, he was appointed during the papacy of Pope Urban VIII as Bishop of San Miniato. He served as Bishop of San Miniato until his death on 28 August 1648.

== External links and additional sources ==
- Cheney, David M. "Diocese of Andria". Catholic-Hierarchy.org. (for Chronology of Bishops) ^{[self-published]}
- Chow, Gabriel. "Diocese of Andria (Italy)". GCatholic.org. (for Chronology of Bishops) ^{[self-published]}
- Cheney, David M. "Diocese of San Miniato". Catholic-Hierarchy.org. (for Chronology of Bishops) ^{[self-published]}
- Chow, Gabriel. "Diocese of San Miniato (Italy)". GCatholic.org. (for Chronology of Bishops) ^{[self-published]}

Catholic Church titles
Preceded by Vincenzo Caputo	Bishop of Andria; 1626–1632	Succeeded by Felice Franceschini
Preceded by Francesco Nori	Bishop of San Miniato; 1632–1648	Succeeded by Angelo Pichi
