= Cardinals created by Innocent XII =

Catholic appointments from 1695 to 1700

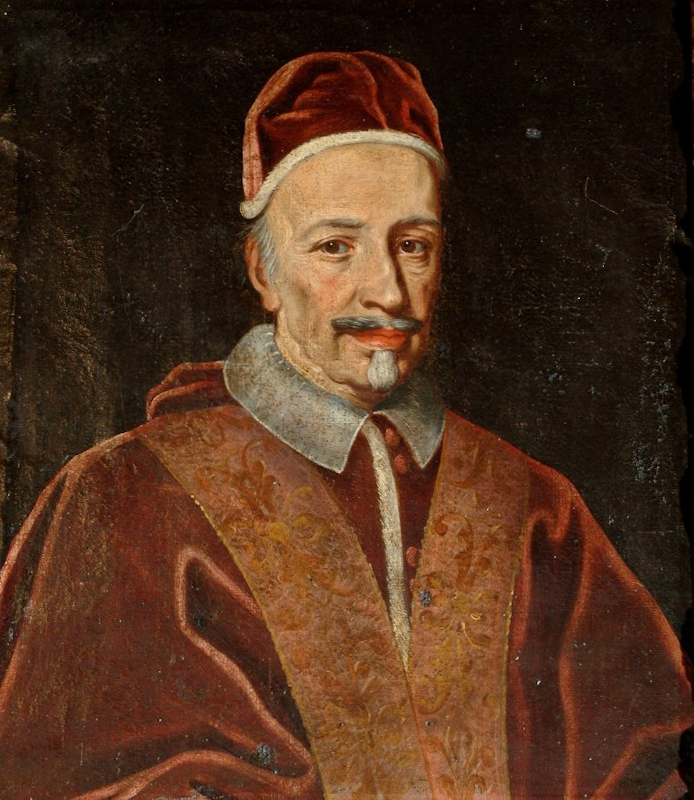
Pope Innocent XII (1615-1700).

Pope Innocent XII (r. 1691–1700) created 30 cardinals in four consistories.

== December 12, 1695 ==
Innocent named twelve cardinals at his first consistory and reserved the names of two more in pectore.

1. Giacomo Antonio Morigia, in pectore, announced 19 December 1698
2. Sebastiano Antonio Tanara
3. Giacomo Boncompagni
4. Giovanni Giacomo Cavallerini
5. Federico Caccia
6. Taddeo Luigi dal Verme
7. Baldassare Cenci (seniore), in pectore, announced 12 November 1697
8. Tommaso Maria Ferrari
9. Giuseppe Sacripante
10. Celestino Sfondrati
11. Enrico Noris
12. Giambattista Spinola, iuniore
13. Domenico Tarugi
14. Henri Albert de la Grange d'Arquien

== July 22, 1697 ==
Vincenzo Grimani (c1655-1710), made a cardinal on July 22, 1697.

1. Luiz de Sousa
2. Giorgio Cornaro
3. Pierre-Armand du Camboust de Coislin
4. Fabrizio Paolucci
5. Alfonso Aguilar Fernández de Córdoba
6. Vincenzo Grimani

== November 14, 1699 ==
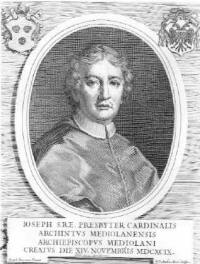
Giuseppe Archinto (1651-1712), made a cardinal on November 14, 1699.

1. Niccolò Radulovich
2. Giuseppe Archinto
3. Andrea Santacroce
4. Marcello d'Aste
5. Daniello Marco Delfino
6. Sperello Sperelli
7. Giovanni Maria Gabrielli

== June 21, 1700 ==
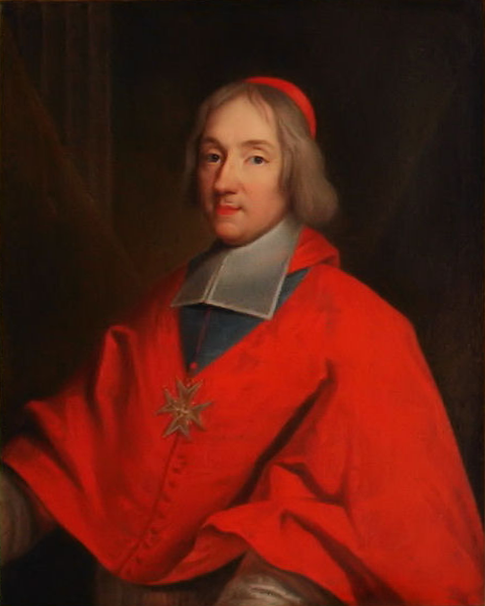
Louis Antoine de Noailles (1651-1729), made a cardinal on June 21, 1700.

1. Louis Antoine de Noailles
2. Johann Philipp von Lamberg
3. Francisco Antonio de Borja-Centelles y Ponce de León

== Additional sources ==
- Miranda, Salvador. "Consistories for the creation of Cardinals 17th Century (1605-1700): Innocent XII". The Cardinals of the Holy Roman Church. Florida International University. OCLC 53276621.
