= Angelo Pichi =

Italian Roman Catholic prelate

Most Reverend Angelo Pichi
- Archbishop (Personal Title) of San Miniato
- Church: Catholic Church
- Diocese: Diocese of San Miniato
- In office: 1648–1653
- Predecessor: Alessandro Strozzi
- Successor: Pietro Frescobaldi

Orders
- Consecration: 14 November 1638 by Giovanni Battista Maria Pallotta

Personal details
- Died: 12 December 1653 San Miniato, Italy

Angelo Pichi or Angelo Pico (died 12 December 1653) was a Roman Catholic prelate who served as Archbishop (Personal Title) of San Miniato (1648–1653) and Archbishop of Amalfi (1638–1648).

== Biography ==
On 10 November 1638, Angelo Pichi was appointed during the papacy of Pope Urban VIII as Archbishop of Amalfi. On 14 November 1638, he was consecrated bishop by Giovanni Battista Maria Pallotta, Cardinal-Priest of San Silvestro in Capite, with Alfonso Gonzaga, Titular Archbishop of Rhodus, and Tommaso Carafa, Bishop Emeritus of Vulturara e Montecorvino, serving as co-consecrators. On 23 November 1648, he was appointed during the papacy of Pope Innocent X as Archbishop (Personal Title) of San Miniato. He served as Bishop of San Miniato until his death on 12 December 1653.

While bishop, he was the principal co-consecrator of Isidoro della Robbia, Bishop of Bertinoro (1642).

== See also ==
- Catholic Church in Italy

== External links and additional sources ==
- Cheney, David M. "Archdiocese of Amalfi-Cava de' Tirreni". Catholic-Hierarchy.org. (for Chronology of Bishops) ^{[self-published]}
- Chow, Gabriel. "Archdiocese of Amalfi-Cava de' Tirreni (Italy)". GCatholic.org. (for Chronology of Bishops) ^{[self-published]}
- Cheney, David M. "Diocese of San Miniato". Catholic-Hierarchy.org. (for Chronology of Bishops) ^{[self-published]}
- Chow, Gabriel. "Diocese of San Miniato (Italy)". GCatholic.org. (for Chronology of Bishops) ^{[self-published]}

Catholic Church titles
Preceded by Matteo Granito	Archbishop of Amalfi; 1638–1648	Succeeded by Stefano Quaranta
Preceded by Alessandro Strozzi	Archbishop (Personal Title) of San Miniato; 1648–1653	Succeeded by Pietro Frescobaldi
