= Pietro Frescobaldi =

17th-century Roman Catholic bishop

Most Reverend Pietro Frescobaldi
- Bishop of San Miniato
- Church: Catholic Church
- Diocese: Diocese of San Miniato
- In office: 1654
- Predecessor: Angelo Pichi
- Successor: Giovanni Battista Barducci

Personal details
- Died: 11 December 1654

Pietro Frescobaldi (died 1654) was a Roman Catholic prelate who served as Bishop of San Miniato (1654).

== Biography ==
On 19 Oct 1654, Pietro Frescobaldi was appointed during the papacy of Pope Innocent X as Bishop of San Miniato. On 28 Oct 1654, he was consecrated bishop by Marcantonio Franciotti, Cardinal-Priest of Santa Maria della Pace, with Onorato Onorati, Bishop of Urbania e Sant'Angelo in Vado, and Vincenzo Candiotti, Bishop of Bagnoregio, serving as co-consecrators. He served as Bishop of San Miniato until his death on 11 Dec 1654.

== External links and additional sources ==
- Cheney, David M. "Diocese of San Miniato". Catholic-Hierarchy.org. (for Chronology of Bishops) ^{[self-published]}
- Chow, Gabriel. "Diocese of San Miniato (Italy)". GCatholic.org. (for Chronology of Bishops) ^{[self-published]}

Catholic Church titles
Preceded by Angelo Pichi	Bishop of San Miniato; 1654	Succeeded by Giovanni Battista Barducci
