= Mansueto Bianchi =

Italian Catholic bishop

His Excellency Mansueto Bianchi
- Bishop of Volterra, Bishop of Pistoia
- Church: Roman Catholic Church
- Diocese: Roman Catholic Diocese of Acireale

Orders
- Ordination: 29 June 1974
- Consecration: 3 May 2000 by Bruno Tomasi

Personal details
- Born: Manueto Bianchi; 4 November 1949 Lucca, Tuscany
- Died: 3 August 2016 (aged 66) Rome

Styles of Mansueto Bianchi
- Reference style: His Excellency
- Spoken style: Your Excellency
- Religious style: bishop

Mansueto Bianchi (Lucca, 4 November 1949 − Rome, 3 August 2016) was an Italian Catholic bishop.

== Biography ==
Born in Lucca, Tuscany, ordained to the priesthood in 1974, Bianchi served as Bishop of Volterra, Italy from 2000 to 2006. He then served as Bishop of Pistoia from 2006 to 2014.

== Notes ==
Catholic Church titles
Preceded by Vasco Giuseppe Bertelli	Bishop of Volterra; 2000–2006	Succeeded by Alberto Silvani
Preceded by Simone Scatizzi	Bishop of Pistoia; 2006–2014	Succeeded by Fausto Tardelli
