= Michele Carlo Visdomini Cortigiani =

Most Reverend Michele Carlo Visdomini Cortigiani
- Bishop of Pistoia e Prato
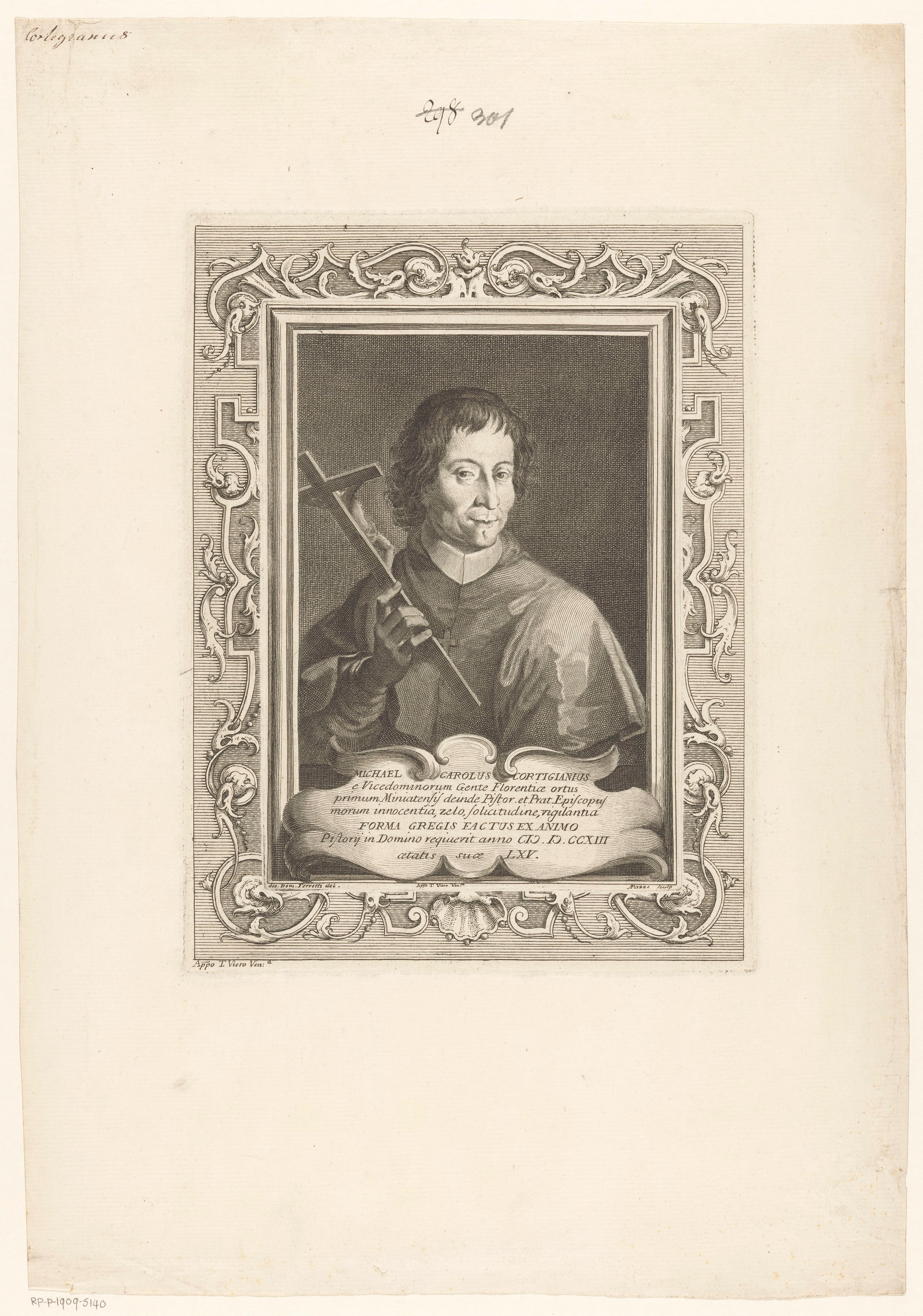
- Church: Catholic Church
- Diocese: Diocese of Pistoia
- In office: 1703–1713
- Predecessor: Francesco Frosini
- Successor: Colombino Bassi
- Previous post: Bishop of San Miniato (1683–1703)

Orders
- Ordination: 1677 by Francesco Nerli (iuniore)
- Consecration: 30 May 1683 by Francesco Nerli (iuniore)

Personal details
- Born: 4 Nov 1648 Florence, Italy
- Died: 14 Oct 1713 (age 64)

Michele Carlo Visdomini Cortigiani (1648–1713) was a Roman Catholic prelate who served as Bishop of Pistoia e Prato (1703–1713) and Bishop of San Miniato (1683–1703).

== Biography ==
Michele Carlo Visdomini Cortigiani was born on 4 Nov 1648 in Florence, Italy and ordained a priest in the Archdiocese of Florence in 1677. On 24 May 1683, he was appointed during the papacy of Pope Innocent XI as Bishop of San Miniato. On 30 May 1683, he was consecrated bishop by Francesco Nerli (iuniore), Cardinal-Priest of San Matteo in Merulana. On 15 Jan 1703, he was transferred by Pope Clement XI to the diocese of Pistoia and Prato. He served as Bishop of Pistoia e Prato until his death on 14 Oct 1713.

While bishop, he was the principal co-consecrator of Tommaso Vidoni, Titular Archbishop of Edessa in Osrhoëne and Apostolic Nuncio to Florence (1691). On 19 June 1685, Bishop Cortigiani held a diocesan synod; he held another on 3 October 1690; and another on 15 September 1699.

== Bibliography ==
- Danti, Andrea (1736). Vita di Monsignore Michel Carlo Visdomini Cortigiani, Patrizio Fiorentino, Vescovo di Samminiato (in Italian). Firenze: Bern. Paperini.

== External links and additional sources ==
Catholic Church titles
Preceded by Giacomo Antonio Morigia	Bishop of San Miniato; 1683–1703	Succeeded by Giovanni Francesco Maria Poggi
Preceded by Francesco Frosini	Bishop of Pistoia e Prato; 1703–1713	Succeeded by Colombino Bassi
