= Mauro Corsi =

17th-century Roman Catholic bishop

Most Reverend Mauro Corsi
- Bishop of San Miniato
- Church: Catholic Church
- Diocese: Diocese of San Miniato
- Predecessor: Giovanni Battista Barducci
- Successor: Giacomo Antonio Morigia

Orders
- Ordination: 23 Mar 1619

Personal details
- Born: 10 Mar 1595 Pecciolo, Italy
- Died: 30 Dec 1680 (age 85)

Mauro Corsi (1595–1680) was a Roman Catholic prelate who served as Bishop of San Miniato (1662–1680).

== Biography ==
Mauro Corsi was born in Pecciolo, Italy on 10 Mar 1595 and ordained a priest on 23 Mar 1619. On 31 Jul 1662, he was appointed during the papacy of Pope Alexander VII as Bishop of San Miniato. He served as Bishop of San Miniato until his death on 30 Dec 1680.

== External links and additional sources ==
- Cheney, David M. "Diocese of San Miniato". Catholic-Hierarchy.org. (for Chronology of Bishops) ^{[self-published]}
- Chow, Gabriel. "Diocese of San Miniato (Italy)". GCatholic.org. (for Chronology of Bishops) ^{[self-published]}

Catholic Church titles
Preceded by Giovanni Battista Barducci	Bishop of San Miniato; 1662–1680	Succeeded by Giacomo Antonio Morigia
