= Edoardo Ricci =

Italian Catholic bishop

- Bishop of San Miniato
- Church: Catholic Church
- Diocese: Diocese of San Miniato
- In office: 27 February 1987 – 6 March 2004
- Predecessor: Paolo Ghizzoni
- Successor: Fausto Tardelli

Orders
- Ordination: 8 October 1950 by Giuseppe Stella
- Consecration: 7 June 1987 by Silvano Piovanelli

Personal details
- Born: 27 April 1928 Pignona di Sesta Godano, Province of La Spezia, Kingdom of Italy
- Died: 28 November 2008 (aged 80) La Spezia, Province of La Spezia, Italy

Edoardo Ricci (27 April 1928 – 28 November 2008) was an Italian Bishop for the Catholic Church.

Born in 1928, Ricci was ordained as a Priest at the age of 23 on 8 October 1950. He was appointed Bishop of the Roman Catholic Diocese of San Miniato, Italy on 27 February 1987 by Pope John Paul II and ordained Bishop on 7 June that year. He retired as Bishop on 6 March 2004 after nearly 17 years. He died on 28 November 2008.
