= Ottavio Acquaviva d'Aragona (1609–1674) =

Roman Catholic cardinal

His Eminence Ottavio Acquaviva d'Aragona, iuniore
- Cardinal-Priest of Santa Cecilia
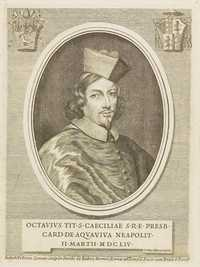
- Church: Catholic Church

Personal details
- Born: 23 Sep 1609 Naples, Italy
- Died: 26 Sep 1674 (age 65)
- Coat of arms

Ottavio Acquaviva d'Aragona, iuniore (1609–1674) was a Roman Catholic cardinal.

He was Camerlengo of the Sacred College of Cardinals between 1669 and 1671 and he participated in 3 conclaves (1665, 1667 and 1669–1670).

Catholic Church titles
Preceded by Agustín Spínola Basadone	Cardinal-Priest of San Bartolomeo all'Isola; 1654–1658	Succeeded by Francesco Nerli (seniore)
Preceded by Francesco Angelo Rapaccioli	Cardinal-Priest of Santa Cecilia; 1658–1674	Succeeded by Philip Thomas Howard of Norfolk
