= Pio Alberto del Corona =

Italian prelate

Blessed Pio Alberto del Corona OP
- Titular Archbishop of Serdica
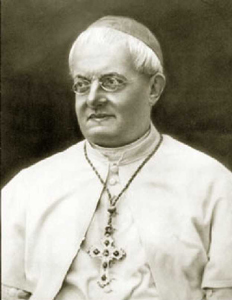
- c. 1900
- Church: Roman Catholic Church
- Appointed: 30 August 1907
- Term ended: 15 August 1912
- Predecessor: Paolo de Sanctis
- Successor: Antonio Augusto Intreccialagi
- Previous posts: Coadjutor Bishop of San Miniato (1874-1897); Titular Bishop of Draso (1874-1907); Bishop of San Miniato (1897-1907)

Orders
- Ordination: 5 February 1860
- Consecration: 3 January 1875 by Costantino Patrizi Naro
- Rank: Archbishop

Personal details
- Born: Alberto del Corona; 5 July 1837 Livorno, Grand Duchy of Tuscany
- Died: 15 August 1912 (aged 75) Florence, Kingdom of Italy

Sainthood
- Feast day: 19 September
- Venerated in: Roman Catholic Church
- Beatified: 19 September 2015; San Miniato, Italy by Cardinal Angelo Amato
- Attributes: Episcopal attire; Crucifix; Dominican habit
- Patronage: Dominican Sisters of the Holy Spirit

Pio Alberto del Corona (5 July 1837 – 15 August 1912), born Alberto del Corona, was an Italian prelate and the founder of the Suore Domenicane dello Spirito Santo. He served as the Bishop of San Miniato from 1897 until his resignation one decade later. The bishop served as a humble pastor though reluctant as he was to accept his episcopal appointment while even protesting against an idea to elevate him into the cardinalate. He exercised his duties until ill health forced him to resign from his see though was given a ceremonial position since Pope Pius X did not wish to relieve him of all his episcopal duties and functions.

His beatification was celebrated on 19 September 2015 in San Miniato; Cardinal Angelo Amato presided over the celebration on the behalf of Pope Francis.

== Life ==
Alberto del Corona was born in Livorno on 5 July 1837 to Giuseppe del Corona and Ester Bucalossi (d. 1839) as their fourth and final child; his parents served as humble footwear retailers. He was baptized on 8 July in the Siena Cathedral in the names of "Alberto Francesco Filomeno". He was often called "Albertino" as an affectionate name. His mother died in 1839 when he was barely two years old.

He spent some time of his childhood in Tremoleto and studied under the Barnabites at the Collegio di San Sebastiano. He made his First Communion on 16 April 1851 in a Barnabite church. At the age of fourteen he joined the Conference of St. Vincent de Paul, and was praised for his work with poor families by the founder, Frédéric Ozanam, when Ozanam visited Livorno in 1853.

Sometime between 1851 and 1854 del Corona became an associate member of the Third Order of Saint DominicDominic. He could not decide whether to join the Barnabites or the Dominicans, but after a visit to the Sanctuary of Montenero, he opted for the Dominicans. He first entered the Convent of San Marco in Florence on 4 December 1854 after pleading with his father to do so and he received the habit on 1 February 1855 after the Vespers. Del Corona became made his vows on 3 November 1859. He was later ordained to priesthood on 5 February 1860 in San Marco, Florence and he assumed the religious name Pio. He celebrated his first Mass on the following 12 February.

Del Corona — along with Pia Elena Bruzzi Bonaguidi (whom he first met in 1869) — was received in private audience to meet Pope Pius IX on 8 May 1872 and from him received his blessing and encouragement of his work. He was granted the pontiff's personal imprimatur to found the "Asilo" of Bolognese as well as a new religious congregation. In 1872 he was appointed as the prior of the convent of San Marco and held that position until 1874.

=== Bishop ===
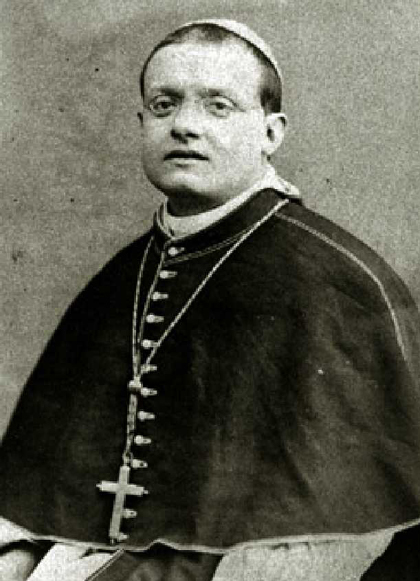
Pio Alberto del Corona in 1875

He founded the Suore Domenicane dello Spirito Santo in 1872 while in San Miniato culminating the work that he began almost a decade prior. Pius IX appointed him in 1874 as the Coadjutor Bishop of San Miniato. Del Corona received his episcopal consecration on 3 January 1875 from Costantino Patrizi Naro in the Saint Apollinaris church. In 1887 he preached the Lent sermons in San Miniato and consecrated the Diocese to the Sacred Heart. Pope Leo XIII appointed him as the Bishop of San Miniato in 1897 after the death of the-then bishop despite his great reluctance. In 1899 he was made an Assistant to the Pontifical Throne which made him a Monsignor.

His most prized possession was an episcopal ring with a topaz that Pius IX had given him in 1874. In 1897 he was present in Florence for the opening of the casket of Antoninus of Florence and removed the ring from the Antonninus's finger while replacing it with that of the one the pope had given him. On 17 April 1899 he was in Rome when he had learned of the death of his fellow Dominican - and the Cardinal Archbishop of Florence - Agostino Bausa. The pope received him in a private audience soon afterwards and suggested to him that he become the new archbishop and then be named as a cardinal. But he was horrified and protested against the idea though was later relieved when the pope decided to appoint another to the position.

The bishop decided to retire from the position in 1906 due to his serious ill health (on 4 August 1906 he was diagnosed with liver disease and was near-blind as well) however Pope Pius X refused to remove him from his episcopal duties in full and instead appointed the Cardinal Archbishop of Pisa Pietro Maffi as the apostolic administrator on 14 September until he could find a replacement; he settled on the latter in 1907 which legitimized his resignation. The Pope appointed him Titular Archbishop of Sardica which would be a ceremonial position in nature while raising him to the rank of archbishop. In 1910 the pope sent to him a personal and handwritten letter to him imparting to the archbishop his apostolic blessing due to it being the half-centennial of his ordination.

Del Corona fell ill and on 10 August 1912 received the last rites. Pius X also sent his blessing to him when he learned of his illness. He died at dawn on the Feast of the Assumption, looking outside the window. He was buried in Florence in the Cimitero della Misericordia where his tomb soon became one of pilgrimage for the faithful. His remains were later transferred on 12 October 1925 and exhumed in 2001 for canonical inspection in the presence of Cardinal José Saraiva Martins as well as four bishops and fifteen priests.

=== Views of contemporaries ===
His contemporaries of the age all held the late archbishop in great esteem. Pope Leo XIII once said that "he is one of the most learned and holy prelates of the Church". Pius X once held a private audience with the Dominican bishop Ludovico Ferretti and advised that the bishop "take good care of him, you know! That one is a saint!" The Cardinal Archbishop of Florence Ermenegildo Florit said that he was a "good and faithful disciple of Saint Dominic."

== Beatification ==
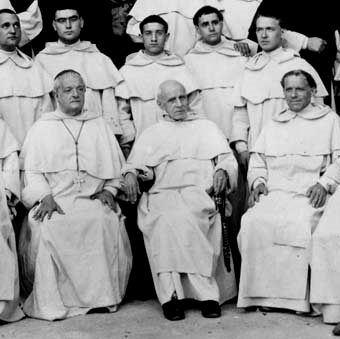
Pio Alberto del Corona (seated left) in 1908 with Hyacinthe-Marie Cormier (seated middle)

The cause for his beatification commenced in 1941 in both Florence and San Miniato which saw Del Corona titled as a Servant of God; this process closed in 1959 at which stage theologians examined and approved his spiritual writings on 3 December 1971 (writings possessing no doctrinal errors). But the cause remained dormant for sometime before it was reactivated and a diocesan process was held from 2000 until 28 August 2002; documents from that and the informative process were sent to officials in the Congregation for the Causes of Saints on 4 September 2002. The cause culminated on 9 October 2013 when Pope Francis declared him to have lived a life of heroic virtue and named him to be venerable.

A miracle attributed to Del Corona's intercession was examined and received approval from medical experts on 28 November 2013, while theologians also approved it on 29 April 2014. The cardinal and bishop members of the Congregation also approved this miracle on 16 September 2014. The pope confirmed this healing to be a legitimate miracle on 17 September 2014. Cardinal Angelo Amato presided over the beatification on the pope's behalf on 19 September 2015 in San Miniato. The postulator for this cause is Gianni Festa OP.
