= Diocese of San Miniato =

Roman Catholic diocese in Italy

Coordinates: 43.6833°N 10.8500°E

Diocese of San Miniato Dioecesis Sancti Miniati

Catholic
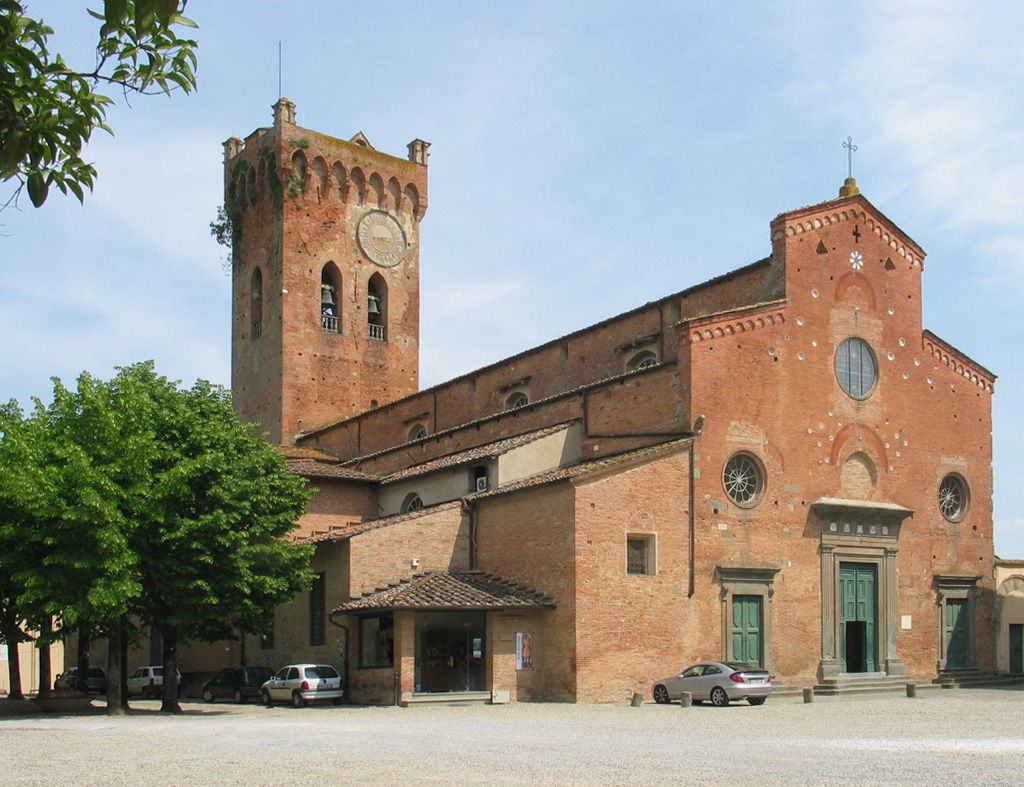
- San Miniato Cathedral

Location
- Country: Italy
- Ecclesiastical province: Florence

Statistics
- Area: 691 km^{2} (267 sq mi)
- Population: Total; Catholics: (as of 2020); 178,734; 165,394 (92.5%)
- Parishes: 91

Information
- Denomination: Catholic Church
- Rite: Roman Rite
- Established: 5 December 1622 (403 years ago)
- Cathedral: Cattedrale di Ss. Maria Assunta e Genesio
- Secular priests: 61 (diocesan); 16 (Religious Orders); 12 Permanent Deacons

Current leadership
- Pope: Leo XIV
- Bishop: Giovanni Paccosi (24 Dec 2022)

Map

Website
- www.sanminiato.chiesacattolica.it

The Diocese of San Miniato (Latin: Dioecesis Sancti Miniati) is a Latin diocese of the Catholic Church in Tuscany. It is a suffragan of the archdiocese of Florence.

== History ==
In 1248, San Genesio was completely destroyed. In 1397, the town was taken by Florence, and was placed under the control of a vicar appointed by the government of Florence. From 21 January 1529 to November 1530, San Miniato was attacked and besieged by Spanish forces. More than 300 inhabitants were killed.

From 1248, the Chapter of the collegiate church of San Genesio was transferred to San Miniato, and in 1527 the head of the Chapter was granted the privilege of wearing pontifical vestments, the mitre, and the use of the pastoral staff, inside the territory of San Miniato. In 1408, the Republic of Florence wished to have it made an episcopal see, being then a territory in the archdiocese of Lucca, but the effort failed.

The situation changed when Maria Maddelena of Austria, the wife of Duke Cosimo II of Tuscany took up residence in S. Miniato, and made herself its patron. She successfully put pressure on Pope Gregory XV. On 5 December 1622, the town (oppidum) of San Miniato was raised to the dignity of a city (civitas), and was named the seat of a bishop by Pope Gregory XV. The church of S. Maria and S. Genesius was elevated to the status of a cathedral. The cathedral Chapter was to consist of two dignities (the Provost and the Archpriest) and twelve Canons. In 1755, there was only one dignity, and fourteen Canons.

The first bishop was Francesco Nori (1624).

=== Diocesan synods ===
A diocesan synod was an irregularly held, but important, meeting of the bishop of a diocese and his clergy. Its purpose was (1) to proclaim generally the various decrees already issued by the bishop; (2) to discuss and ratify measures on which the bishop chose to consult with his clergy; (3) to publish statutes and decrees of the diocesan synod, of the provincial synod, and of the Holy See.

Bishop Alessandro Strozzi (1632–1648) held a diocesan synod on 1 December 1638. On 19 June 1685, Bishop Michele Carlo Cortigiani (1683–1703) held a diocesan synod; he held another on 3 October 1690; and another on 15 September 1699. Bishop Giovanni Francesco Maria Poggi, O.S.M. (1703–1719) held a diocesan synod on 21–22 May 1707. Bishop Torello Romolo Pierazzi (1834–1851) held a diocesan synod in 1843.

== Bishops ==
- Francesco Nori (1624–1631)
- Alessandro Strozzi (1632–1648)
- Angelo Pichi (Pico) (1648–1653 Died)
- Pietro Frescobaldi (1654–1655)
- Giovanni Battista Barducci (1656–1661)
- Mauro Corsi (1662–1680)
- Giacomo Antonio Morigia, B. (1681–1683)
- Michele Carlo Visdomini Cortigiani (1683–1703)
- Giovanni Francesco Maria Poggi, O.S.M. (1703–1719 Died)
- Andrea Luigi Cattani (1720–1734 Died)
- Giuseppe Suares de la Concha (1735–1754 Died)
- Domenico Poltri (1755–1778)
- Francesco Brunone Fazzi (1779–1806 Died)
- Pietro Fazzi (1806–1832 Died)
- Torello Romolo Pierazzi (1834–1851 Died)
- Francesco Marie Alli Maccarani (1854–1863 Died)
- Annibale Barabesi (1867–1897)
- Pio Alberto del Corona, O.P. (1897–1907 Retired)
- Carlo Falcini (1907–1928 Died)
- Ugo Giubbi (1928–1946 Died)
- Felice Beccaro (1946–1972 Died)
- Paolo Ghizzoni (1972–1986 Died)
- Edoardo Ricci (1987–2004 Retired)
- Fausto Tardelli (2004–2014 Appointed, Bishop of Pistoia)
- Andrea Migliavacca (2015–2022 Appointed, Bishop of Arezzo-Cortona-Sansepolcro)
- Giovanni Paccosi Carrai (24 Dec 2022– )

== Bibliography ==
=== Reference for bishops ===
- Gams, Pius Bonifatius (1873). Series episcoporum Ecclesiae catholicae: quotquot innotuerunt a beato Petro apostolo. Ratisbon: Typis et Sumptibus Georgii Josephi Manz. p. 751. (in Latin)
- Gauchat, Patritius (Patrice) (1935). Hierarchia catholica. Vol. Tomus IV (1592-1667). Münster: Libraria Regensbergiana. (in Latin)
- Ritzler, Remigius; Sefrin, Pirminus (1952). Hierarchia catholica medii et recentis aevi V (1667-1730). Patavii: Messagero di S. Antonio.
- Ritzler, Remigius; Sefrin, Pirminus (1958). Hierarchia catholica medii et recentis aevi. Vol. Tomus VI (1730-1799). Patavii: Messagero di S. Antonio. (in Latin)
- Ritzler, Remigius; Sefrin, Pirminus (1968). Hierarchia Catholica medii et recentioris aevi sive summorum pontificum, S. R. E. cardinalium, ecclesiarum antistitum series... A pontificatu Pii PP. VII (1800) usque ad pontificatum Gregorii PP. XVI (1846) (in Latin). Vol. VII. Monasterii: Libr. Regensburgiana.
- Remigius Ritzler; Pirminus Sefrin (1978). Hierarchia catholica Medii et recentioris aevi... A Pontificatu PII PP. IX (1846) usque ad Pontificatum Leonis PP. XIII (1903) (in Latin). Vol. VIII. Il Messaggero di S. Antonio.
- Pięta, Zenon (2002). Hierarchia catholica medii et recentioris aevi... A pontificatu Pii PP. X (1903) usque ad pontificatum Benedictii PP. XV (1922) (in Latin). Vol. IX. Padua: Messagero di San Antonio. ISBN 978-88-250-1000-8.

=== Studies ===
- Cappelletti, Giuseppe (1862). Le chiese d'Italia dalla loro origine sino ai nostri giorni (in Italian). Vol. Tomo decimosettimo (17). Venezia: Antonelli. pp. 305–347.
- Romby, Giuseppina Carla (2004). La Cattedrale di San Miniato (in Italian). Ospedaletto (Pisa): Pacini. ISBN 978-88-7781-629-0.
- Rondoni, Giuseppe (1877). Memorie storiche di S. Miniato al Tedesco con documenti inediti (in Italian). S. Miniato: Tip. Massimo Ristori.
- Simoncini, Vasco; Cinelli, Cristini; Desideri, Silvia (1989). San Miniato e la sua diocesi: I vescovi, le istituzioni, la gente (in Italian). San Miniato: Cassa di Risparmo di San Miniato.
- Ughelli, Ferdinando; Coleti, Niccolò (1718). Italia sacra sive De episcopis Italiæ, et insularum adjacentium (in Latin). Vol. Tomus tertius (3). Venice: apud Sebastianum Coleti. pp. 269–282.
