= Francesco Nerli (seniore) =

Roman Catholic cardinal (1594 - 1670)

His Eminence Francesco Nerli
- Cardinal-Priest of San Bartolomeo all'Isola; Archbishop of Florence
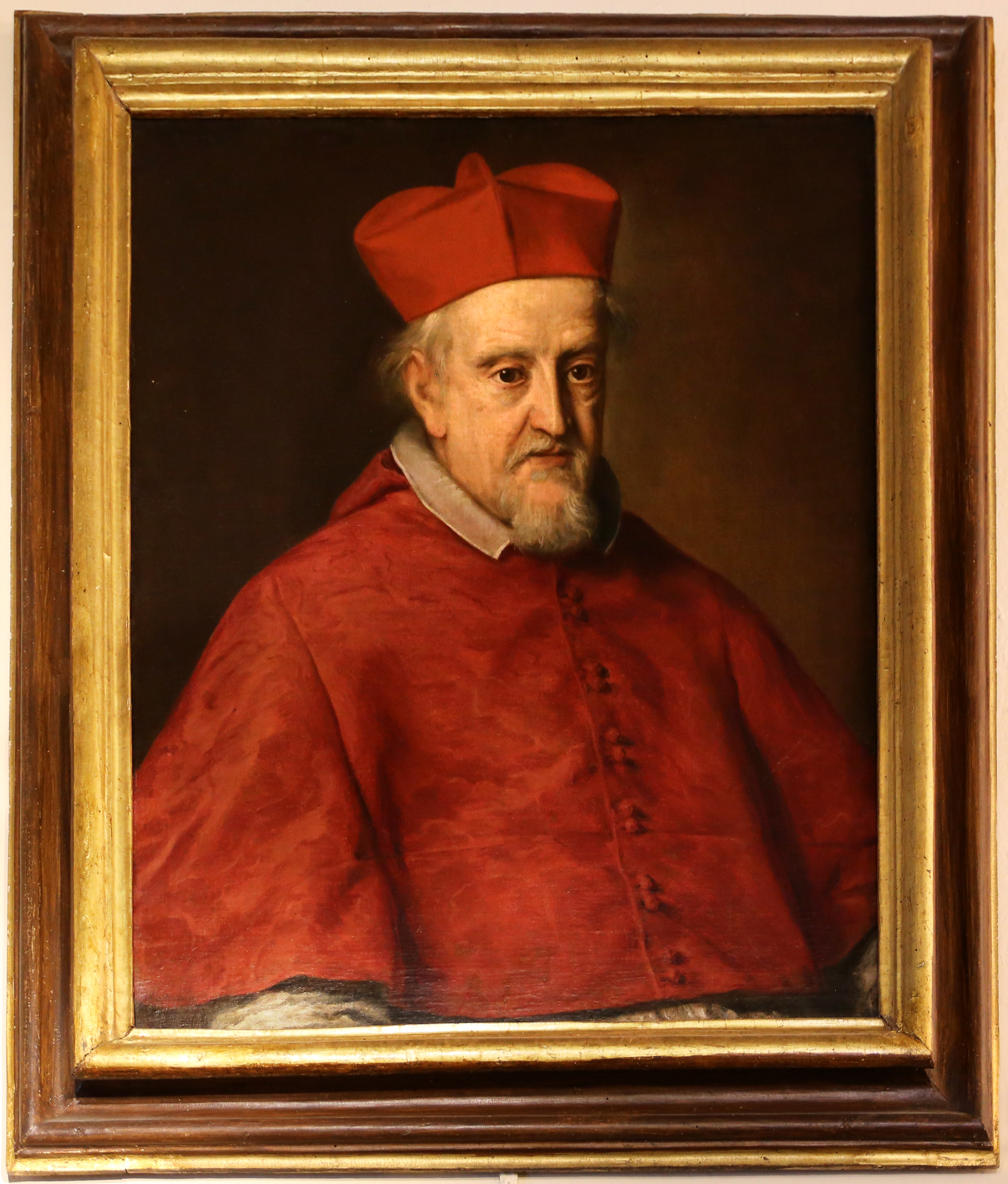
- Church: Catholic Church

Orders
- Consecration: 6 Jun 1650 by Giovanni Giacomo Panciroli

Personal details
- Born: 1594 Florence, Grand Duchy of Tuscany
- Died: 6 Nov 1670 (age 76) Rome, Papal States
- Coat of arms

Francesco Nerli, seniore (1594–1670) was a Roman Catholic cardinal.

== Biography ==
On 6 Jun 1650, he was consecrated bishop by Giovanni Giacomo Panciroli, Cardinal-Priest of Santo Stefano al Monte Celio, with Giovanni Battista Rinuccini, Archbishop of Fermo, and Luca Torreggiani, Archbishop of Ravenna, serving as co-consecrators.

While bishop, he was the principal consecrator of Francesco Pannocchieschi d'Elci, Archbishop of Pisa (1663).

Catholic Church titles
Preceded by Alessandro del Caccia	Bishop of Pistoia; 1650–1652	Succeeded by Giovanni Gerini
Preceded by Pietro Niccolini	Archbishop of Florence; 1652–1670	Succeeded by Francesco Nerli (iuniore)
Preceded by Ottavio Acquaviva d'Aragona (iuniore)	Cardinal-Priest of San Bartolomeo all'Isola; 1670	Succeeded by Johann Eberhard Nidhard
