= San Pietro Somaldi, Lucca =

Church building in Lucca, Italy

Coordinates: 43.8455°N 10.5083°E

San Pietro Somaldi is a Gothic- style, Roman Catholic church located on a Piazza of the same name, near the location of the old medieval walls, in central Lucca, region of Tuscany, Italy.

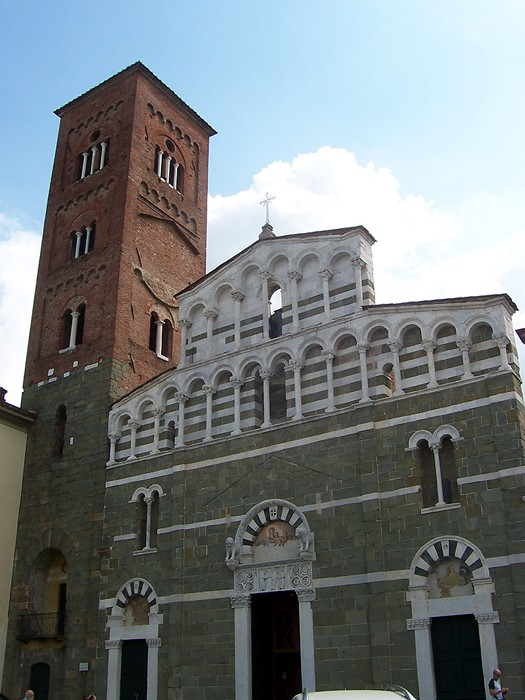
Facade

== History ==
A Lombard church, it was named in part after a bishop Sumualdo or Summal, who founded the church in 763. It was once property of the Lombard king Aistulf. Reconstruction of a new church started in the 12th-century, and was not complete until 14th-centuries.

The central portal has a sculpted relief depicting St Paul gaining keys (1248) by Guido Bigarelli of Como.
