= Giovanni Battista Barducci =

17th-century Roman Catholic bishop

Most Reverend Giovanni Battista Barducci
- Bishop of San Miniato
- Church: Catholic Church
- Diocese: Diocese of San Miniato
- Predecessor: Pietro Frescobaldi
- Successor: Mauro Corsi

Personal details
- Died: 17 September 1661

Giovanni Battista Barducci (died 1661) was a Roman Catholic prelate who served as Bishop of San Miniato (1656–1661).

== Biography ==
On 17 June 1656, Giovanni Battista Barducci was appointed Bishop of San Miniato by Pope Alexander VII. He served as Bishop of San Miniato until his death on 17 September 1661.

== External links and additional sources ==
- Cheney, David M. "Diocese of San Miniato". Catholic-Hierarchy.org. (for Chronology of Bishops) ^{[self-published]}
- Chow, Gabriel. "Diocese of San Miniato (Italy)". GCatholic.org. (for Chronology of Bishops) ^{[self-published]}

Catholic Church titles
Preceded by Pietro Frescobaldi	Bishop of San Miniato; 1656–1661	Succeeded by Mauro Corsi
