= Aligi Barducci =

Italian soldier and Resistance leader (1913–1944)

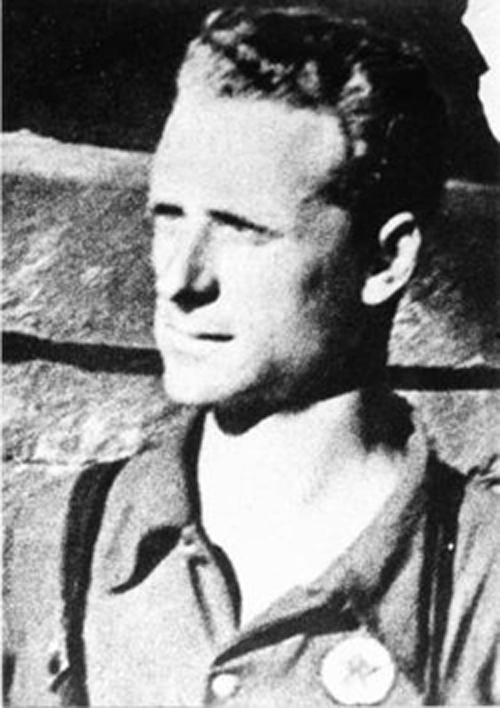
- Born: 10 May 1913; Florence, Kingdom of Italy
- Died: 9 August 1944 (aged 31); Greve in Chianti, Kingdom of Italy
- Military career
- Allegiance: Kingdom of Italy
- Branch: Royal Italian Army
- Service years: 1934–1936, 1940–1943
- Rank: Lieutenant
- Nickname: Potente
- Conflicts: Second Italo-Ethiopian War; World War II; Allied invasion of Sicily; Italian campaign
- Awards: Gold Medal of Military Valour (posthumous)

Aligi Barducci (10 May 1913 – 9 August 1944) was an Italian soldier and Resistance leader during World War II.

== Biography ==
He was born in Florence, in the working-class district of Pignone, on 10 May 1913, the son of Duilio Barducci and Brunetta Fanfani. He had to leave his studies early to start working, but continued to study privately. In 1934 he was called up for military service and sent to Somalia, where he remained for two years. After being discharged he returned to Florence and in the following years worked in his hometown, in Chieti and in Como; in October 1940 he obtained the diploma of accountant and enrolled in the Faculty of Economics of the University of Florence. In the same year he was recalled into service by the Royal Italian Army, promoted to corporal and enrolled in a course for officer cadets in Pisa, graduating as a second lieutenant (later promoted to lieutenant).

In 1942 he was stationed in Como, then in Liguria and subsequently assigned to the 10th Arditi Regiment in Santa Severa, where he was commander of one of the patrols nicknamed "la potente" ("the Powerful"). He was later transferred to Pola and in May 1943 he was deployed with the 2nd Arditi Battalion near Acireale, Sicily. There he participated in the fighting against the Allies during the unsuccessful defence of the island in July–August 1943, after which at the end of August he returned with the other survivors to Santa Marinella, where the 10th Arditi Regiment had its headquarters. There he was at the proclamation of the Armistice of Cassibile on 8 September 1943; while some of his comrades decided to continue the war alongside the Germans, he tried, without success, to organize the resistance against the former allies turned occupiers in the Roman countryside.

He returned to Florence on 3 October 1943, and soon entered into contact with members of the local anti-fascist movement. He was initially served as liaison with the first partisan bands organized on Monte Morello; he took up the nom de guerre of "Potente", from the name of the patrol he had commanded in the last period before the armistice, and joined a partisan group in the area of Montepulico, near Borgo San Lorenzo. Barducci did not immediately acquire a position of command, and had to overcome the distrust of the "old" anti-fascists, not an easy task for a former officer from a unit of the Royal Italian Army that was seen as Fascist-leaning. In the following months, he endeavoured to unite all partisan groups active in the area of Acone and Monte Giovi into a single, larger partisan unit, which became the 22nd Garibaldi Brigade "Lanciotto", of which he was elected commander.

On 23 May 1944 the brigade moved to the area of Montemignaio and Castel San Niccolò, establishing a free zone on the Pratomagno. On 29 June 1944 the brigade suffered heavy casualties during the so-called "battle of Cetica", a clash with troops of the Italian Social Republic supported by German Brandenburgers. On 6 July 1944 the "Lanciotto" Brigade, along with three more partisan brigades, gave birth to the Garibaldi Assault Division "Arno", consisting of some 2,400 partisans, of which Barducci became commander. In the following weeks, the division fought the Germans and Fascists in Mugello and assisted the local population, targeted by the reprisals. In mid-July 1944, as the Allies were advancing towards Florence, the "Arno" Division also started to move towards the city, participating in the battle for its liberation.

During the night of August 4, the Germans blew up the bridges over the Arno in Florence; in the morning the first units of the "Arno" Division entered the southern part the city, followed by Barducci and the men of the "Lanciotto" Brigade, after an exhausting march. Most German and Fascist troops had by this point retreated north of the Arno, but hundreds of snipers were left behind in the Oltrarno district with the task of delaying the Allied advance; the partisans started to hunt them down block by block. On the evening of 8 August, while clashes raged between the partisans and the snipers, Barducci was mortally wounded by a hand grenade in Oltrarno, while heading to Piazza Santo Spirito for talks with the local Allied command and with Angiolo Gracci, commander of the "Sinigaglia" Partisan Brigade. He was first taken to the district infirmary, then to a field hospital on the Pian dei Giullari and from there to the hospital of Greve in Chianti, where he died at dawn on the following day, 9 August 1944. Florence was fully liberated two days later. He was posthumously awarded the Gold Medal of Military Valor, and the Garibaldi Division "Arno" was renamed Garibaldi Division "Potente" in his honor.
