= Giacomo Antonio Morigia =

Roman Catholic Cardinal

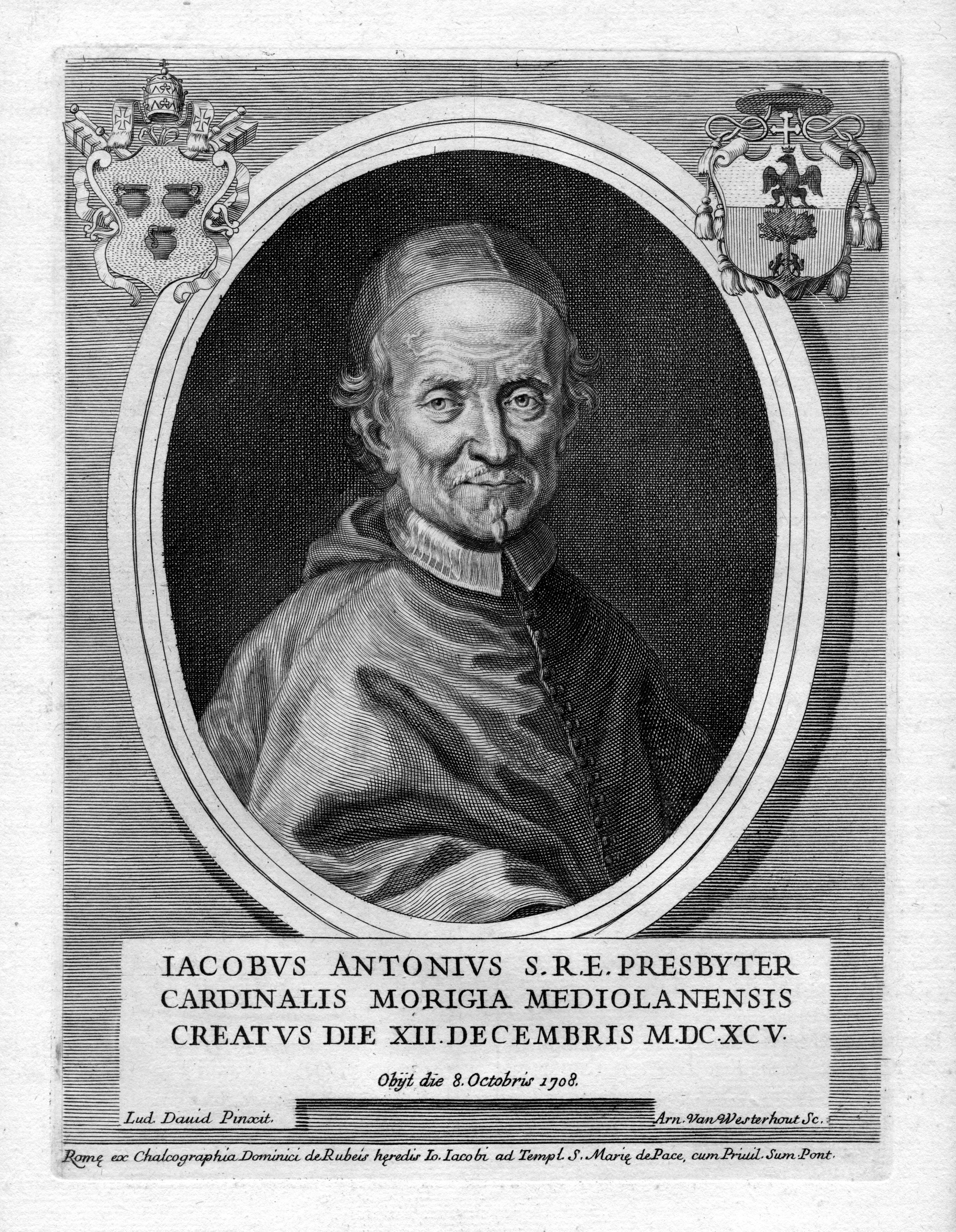
Cardinal Giacomo Antonio Morigia.

Jacopo Antonio Morigia also known as Giacomo Antonio Moriggia (Milan, 23 February 1633 – Pavia, 8 October 1708 ) was a cardinal and Italian Catholic archbishop.

He was Bishop of San Miniato from 1 September 1681 - 15 February 1683, Metropolitan Archbishop of Florence from 15 February 1683 - 23 October 1699, Cardinal Priest of Santa Cecilia from 11 April 1698 - 8 October 1708, Archpriest of the Liberian Basilica of Santa Maria Maggiore from 20 April - 28 October 1699 and also Bishop of Pavia from 24 January 1701 - 8 October 1708.

He was one of the Cardinals created by Innocent XII.

== Life ==
He came from the illustrious Milanese family of Moriggia, and studied mathematics and architecture, and only joined the church later in life.

On 15 April 1536 Morigia was elected Superior of the Barnabites, a society of priests who would concern themselves with the reformation of the laity and the clergy.

Catholic Church titles
Preceded by Mauro Corsi	Bishop of San Miniato; 1681–1683	Succeeded by Michele Carlo Visdomini Cortigiani
Preceded by Francesco Nerli (iuniore)	Archbishop of Florence; 1683–1699	Succeeded by Leone Strozzi
Preceded by Celestino Sfondrati	Cardinal-Priest of Santa Cecilia; 1699–1708	Succeeded by Francesco Acquaviva d'Aragona
Preceded by Benedetto Pamphilj	Archpriest of the Basilica di Santa Maria Maggiore; 1699–1701	Succeeded by Pietro Ottoboni
Preceded by Lorenzo Trotti	Archbishop (Personal Title) of Pavia; 1701–1708	Succeeded by Agostino Cusani
