= Diocese of Pistoia =

Roman Catholic diocese in Italy

Coordinates: 40.6167°N 16.1500°E

Diocese of Pistoia Dioecesis Pistoriensis

Catholic
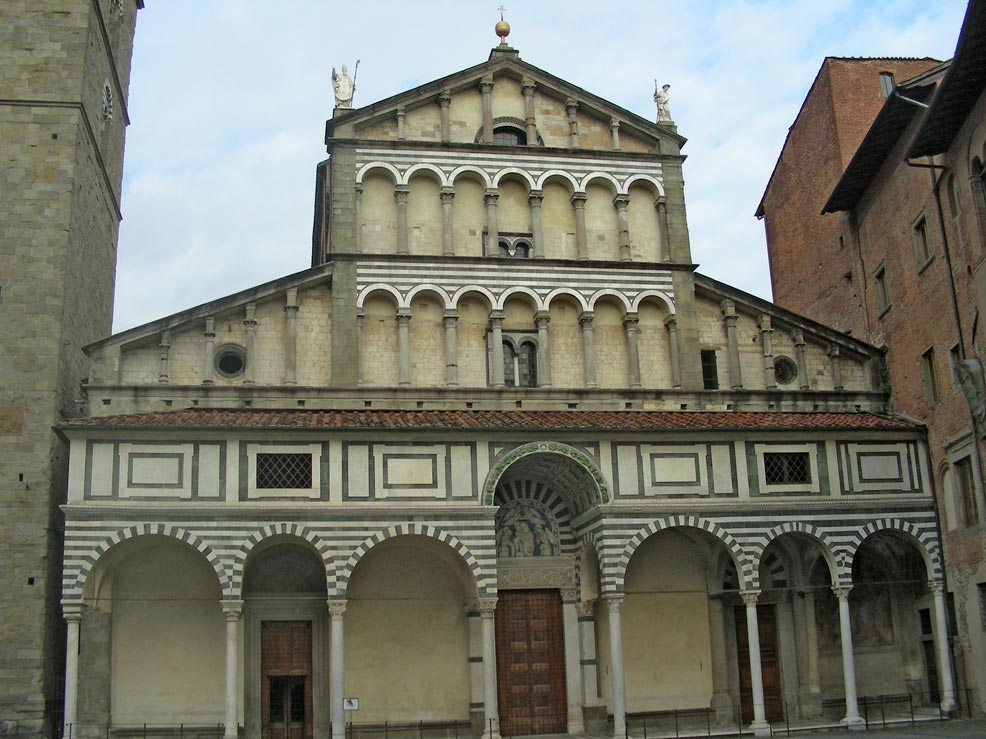
- Pistoia Cathedral

Location
- Country: Italy
- Ecclesiastical province: Florence

Statistics
- Area: 821 km^{2} (317 sq mi)
- Population: Total; Catholics: (as of 2023); 208,108; 203,900 (98.0%)
- Parishes: 160

Information
- Denomination: Catholic Church
- Sui iuris church: Latin Church
- Rite: Roman Rite
- Established: 3rd Century
- Cathedral: Basilica Cattedrale di S. Zenone
- Secular priests: 90 (diocesan); 15 (Religious Orders); 19 Permanent Deacons

Current leadership
- Pope: Leo XIV
- Bishop: Augusto Mascagna
- Bishops emeritus: Fausto Tardelli

Map

Website
- www.diocesipistoia.it

The Diocese of Pistoia (Latin: Dioecesis Pistoriensis) is a Latin diocese of the Catholic Church located in the Province of Florence. It has existed since the third century. From 1653 to 1954, the historic diocese was the diocese of Pistoia and Prato. The Diocese of Prato has been separate from 1954. The diocese is a suffragan of the archdiocese of Florence.

== History ==
The name of Pistoia appears for the first time in history in connection with the conspiracy of Catiline (62 BC), but it was only after the sixth century that it became important; it was governed, first, by its bishops, later by stewards of the Marquis of Tuscany. It was the first to establish its independence, after the death of Countess Matilda, and its municipal statutes were the most ancient of their kind in Italy.

Pistoia claims to have received the Gospel from Romulus of Fiesole, the first Bishop of Fiesole. There is no proof of this claim. Neither is there evidence of a 3rd century foundation of the diocese. The first documentary evidence of a Bishop of Pistoia, however, is c.492, though the name of this prelate is unknown.

In 998, the cathedral of Pistoia was dedicated in honor of Ss. Zeno, Rufinus and Felix, none of whom was a bishop of Pistoia.

As early as 1409, Florence had asked for the creation of a diocese at Prato, on account of the dissensions of the collegiate church of Prato with the Bishops of Pistoia; and in 1460, it had been made a prelatura nullius, and often given to some cardinal, in commendam.

On 22 September 1653, Prato was made a diocese by Pope Innocent X through the bull Redemptoris Nostri, and united aeque principaliter, with Pistoia.

In the first half of the 20th century, both the populations and the commercial activities of Pistoia and of Prato had greatly increased. Explicitly recognizing these facts, on 25 January 1954, by virtue of the bull Clerus Populusque, Pope Pius XII separated the diocese of Prato from the diocese of Pistoia, which had up to then been united through having one and the same bishop, though maintaining separate diocesan structures. Prato was to have its own bishop, and any adjustments which had to be made between the two dioceses were to be adjudicated by the Metropolitan, the Archbishop of Florence.

On 14 October 2023, with the appointment of Fausto Tardelli as bishop of Pescia, the Diocese of Pescia was united with the Diocese of Pistoia in the person of a single bishop.

=== Chapter and cathedral ===
The cathedral, which was dedicated to S. Zeno, was originally administered by a Chapter, composed of twenty-two Canons, led by four ancient dignities; to these four were later added six more. The dignities included: the Archdeacon, the Dean, the Primicerius, the Treasurer, the Prior, the Sacristan, the Rector, and the Custos. At Pistoia the right of patronage over individual dignities was recognized: the Pandolfini of Florence over the Archdeaconate; the Panciatici over the Deanship; the Conversini over the Primicerius; the Bracciolini over the Treasurership; the Panciatici over the Priorate; the Alfarali over the Sacristan; the Gualfreducci over the Rectorate; and the Marchettae over the Custos.

In 1667, Bishop Francesco Rinuccini (1656–1678) and the cathedral Chapter clashed over the right to appoint to vacant canonries, which were supposed to be done jointly by the bishop and Chapter. The matter was settled in an agreement of 27 September 1667, in which it was agreed that the bishop and the Chapter would make appointments alternately.

In 1776 the Chapter of the cathedral of Pistoia was composed of eleven dignities and twenty-seven Canons. The Chapter of Prato was composed of five dignities (originally six: the Provost, the Primicerius, the Archpriest, the Archdeacon, the Dean, and the Treasurer) and twenty-six Canons.

=== Diocesan synods ===
A diocesan synod was an irregularly held, but important, meeting of the bishop of a diocese and his clergy. Its purpose was (1) to proclaim generally the various decrees already issued by the bishop; (2) to discuss and ratify measures on which the bishop chose to consult with his clergy; (3) to publish statutes and decrees of the diocesan synod, of the provincial synod, and of the Holy See.

Bishop Thomas held a synod in 1322. Bishop Hermannus Anastasi (1307–1321) presided over a diocesan synod on 8 December 1308. He held another synod in 1313. Bishop Baronto Ricciardi (1322–1348) held a diocesan synod on 7 September 1322, at which the bishop and synod ratified the decrees of the synods of Bishop Thomas and Bishop Ermanno Anastasi.

Bishop Francesco Rinuccini (1656–1678) held a diocesan synod in Prato in 1662. He held synods in Pistoia in 1662 and 1669.

Bishop Gherardo Gherardi (1679–1690) held three diocesan synods in Pistoia, the third of which was celebrated on 21 May 1685. Bishop Leone Strozzi, O.S.B. (1690–1700) held a diocesan synod in Pistoia in the cathedral on 19 September 1694.

Bishop Michele Cortigiani (1703–1713) held a diocesan synod in the cathedral of Pistoia on 28 April 1707. Bishop Colombino Bassi, O.S.B. (1715–1732) held a diocesan synod on 5 June 1721.

In September 1786, Bishop Scipione de' Ricci (1780–1791) held a diocesan synod, and published the constitutions and decrees. Eighty-five of the propositions in the decrees were condemned by Pope Pius VI in the bull Auctorem fidei of August 28, 1794, four of which were specifically labeled as heretical.

== Bishops ==
=== Diocese of Pistoia ===
==== to 1200 ====
...

- Anonymous (c.492–496)

...

- Joannes (700)

...

- Willretradus (Guillerado) (attested 806–812)

...

- Lamprandus (attested 826)

...

- Gausprandus (attested 844)
- Oschisius (attested 850, 877)

...

- Asterius (attested c. 901, 904)
- Wido (Guido) (attested 916, c.937)
- Hubertus (Uberto)
- Raimbaldus (attested 940, 941)
- Joannes (attested 951, 982)
- Antoninus (attested 985, 1011)
- Wido (attested 1012)
- Restaldus (attested 1018, 1023)
- Wido (attested 1024–1042)
- Martinus (attested 1043–1057)

...

- Leo (attested 1065, 1085)
- Petrus, O.S.B.Vall. (attested 1086, 1100)
- Ildebrando, O.S.B.Vall. (1105–1131)
- Atto (1135–1153);
- Tracia (1154–1175)
- Raynaldus Guidi (attested 1178–1187)
- Bonus (1187–1208)

=== from 1200 to 1500 ===
- Soffredus (1208–1210)
- Soffredus Soffredi (c. 1211–1222 resigned)
- Thomas (1222)
- Gratiadeus Berlinghieri (1223–1250)
- Guidalostus Vergiolesi (1252–1286)
- Thomas Andrei (1286–1303)
- Bartholomaeus Sinibaldi (1303–1307)
- Hermannus Anastasi (1307–1321)
- Barontius Ricciardi (1322–1348)
- Andreas Ciantori (1349–1356)
- Remigius di Bartolomeo, O.E.S.A. (1357-1370)
- Giovanni Vivenzi (1370–1381)
- Andrea Franchi, O.P. (1381–1400 Resigned)
- Matteo Diamanti (1400–1425 Died)
- Ubertino Albizi, O.P. (1426–1434 Died)
- Donato de' Medici (1436–1474)
- Niccolò Pandolfini (1474–1518)

=== from 1500 to 1652 ===
- Cardinal Lorenzo Pucci (1518)
- Cardinal Antonio Pucci 1518–1541 Resigned)
- Cardinal Roberto Pucci (1541–1546)
- Francesco da Galliano (1546–1559 Died)
- Giovambattista Ricasoli (1560–1572 Died)
- Alessandro Ottaviano de' Medici (1573–1574)
- Ludovico Antinori (1574–1575)
- Lattanzio Lattanzi (1575–1587 Died)
- Ottavio Abbiosi (1587–1599 Resigned)
- Fulvio Passerini (1599–1599 Died)
- Alessandro del Caccia (1600–1649 Died)
- Francesco Nerli (seniore) (1650–1652)

=== Diocese of Pistoia e Prato ===
Name Changed: 22 September 1653

- Giovanni Gerini (1653–1656)
- Francesco Rinuccini (1656–1678)
- Gherardo Gherardi (1679–1690)
- Leone Strozzi, O.S.B. (1690–1700)
- Francesco Frosini (1701–1702)
- Michele Carlo Visdomini Cortigiani (1703–1713 Died)
- Colombino Bassi, O.S.B. (1715–1732)
- Federico Alamanni (1732–1775 Died)
- Giuseppe Ippoliti (1776–1780 Died)
- Scipione de' Ricci (1780–1791 Resigned)
- Francesco Falchi Picchinesi (1791–1803 Died)
- Francesco Toli (1803–1833 Died)
- Angiolo Maria Gilardoni (1834–1835 Died)
- Giovanni Battista Rossi (1837–1849 Died)
- Leone Niccolai, O. Cart. (1849–1857 Died)
- Enrico Bindi (1867–1871 Appointed, Archbishop of Siena)
- Niccola Sozzifanti (1871–1883 Died)
- Donato Velluti Zati di San Clemente (1883–1885 Resigned)
- Marcello Mazzanti (1885–1908 Died)
- Andrea Sarti (1909–1915 Died)
- Gabriele Vettori (1915–1932 Appointed, Archbishop of Pisa)
- Giuseppe Debernardi (1933–1953)

=== Diocese of Pistoia ===
25 January 1954: Split into the Diocese of Pistoia and Diocese of Prato

- Mario Longo Dorni (1954–1985 Died)
- Simone Scatizzi (1981–2006 Retired)
- Mansueto Bianchi (2006–2014 Resigned)
- Fausto Tardelli (2014–2026 Retired)
- Augusto Mascagna (2026–)

== See also ==
- Timeline of Pistoia

== Bibliography ==
=== Reference for bishops ===
- Gams, Pius Bonifatius (1873). Series episcoporum Ecclesiae catholicae: quotquot innotuerunt a beato Petro apostolo. Ratisbon: Typis et Sumptibus Georgii Josephi Manz. pp. 750–751. (in Latin)
- Gauchat, Patritius (Patrice) (1935). Hierarchia catholica. Vol. Tomus IV (1592-1667). Münster: Libraria Regensbergiana. (in Latin)
- Ritzler, Remigius; Sefrin, Pirminus (1952). Hierarchia catholica medii et recentis aevi V (1667-1730). Patavii: Messagero di S. Antonio.
- Ritzler, Remigius; Sefrin, Pirminus (1958). Hierarchia catholica medii et recentis aevi. Vol. Tomus VI (1730-1799). Patavii: Messagero di S. Antonio. (in Latin)
- Ritzler, Remigius; Sefrin, Pirminus (1968). Hierarchia Catholica medii et recentioris aevi sive summorum pontificum, S. R. E. cardinalium, ecclesiarum antistitum series... A pontificatu Pii PP. VII (1800) usque ad pontificatum Gregorii PP. XVI (1846) (in Latin). Vol. VII. Monasterii: Libr. Regensburgiana.
- Remigius Ritzler; Pirminus Sefrin (1978). Hierarchia catholica Medii et recentioris aevi... A Pontificatu PII PP. IX (1846) usque ad Pontificatum Leonis PP. XIII (1903) (in Latin). Vol. VIII. Il Messaggero di S. Antonio.
- Pięta, Zenon (2002). Hierarchia catholica medii et recentioris aevi... A pontificatu Pii PP. X (1903) usque ad pontificatum Benedictii PP. XV (1922) (in Latin). Vol. IX. Padua: Messagero di San Antonio. ISBN 978-88-250-1000-8.

=== Studies ===
- Beani, Gaetano (1912). La Chiesa pistoiese dalla sua origine ai tempi nostri. Appunti storici. Pistoia: D. Pagani 1912 (in Italian) [Chapter IV, pp. 41–85]
- Cappelletti, Giuseppe (1862). Le chiese d'Italia dalla loro origine sino ai nostri giorni (in Italian). Vol. 17 (Tomo decimosettimo). Venezia: Antonelli. pp. 282–340.
- Capponi, Vittorio (1883). Biografia pistoiese, o Notizie della vita e delle opere dei pistoiesi illustri nelle scienze, nelle lettere, nelle arti, per azioni virtuose, per la santità della vita (in Italian). Pistoia: Tipografia Rossetti.
- Kehr, Paul Fridolin (1908). Italia pontificia (in Latin). Vol. Tomus Tertius: Etruria. Berlin: Weidmann. pp. 118–143.
- Lanzoni, Francesco (1927). Le diocesi d'Italia dalle origini al principio del secolo VII (an. 604), Faenza 1927, pp. 573–584. (in Italian)
- Rosati, Antonio Maria (1766). Memorie per servire alla storia dei vescovi di Pistoja (in Italian). Pistoja: Bracali.
- Schwartz, Gerhard (1907). Die Besetzung der Bistümer Reichsitaliens unter den sächsischen und salischen Kaisern: mit den Listen der Bischöfe, 951-1122. Leipzig: B.G. Teubner. pp. 219–221. (in German)
- Ughelli, Ferdinando; Coleti, Niccolò (1718). Italia sacra sive De episcopis Italiæ, et insularum adjacentium (in Latin). Vol. Tomus tertius (3). Venice: apud Sebastianum Coleti. pp. 282–340.
