= 1741 in architecture =

The year 1741 in architecture involved some significant events.

== Buildings and structures ==
=== Buildings ===
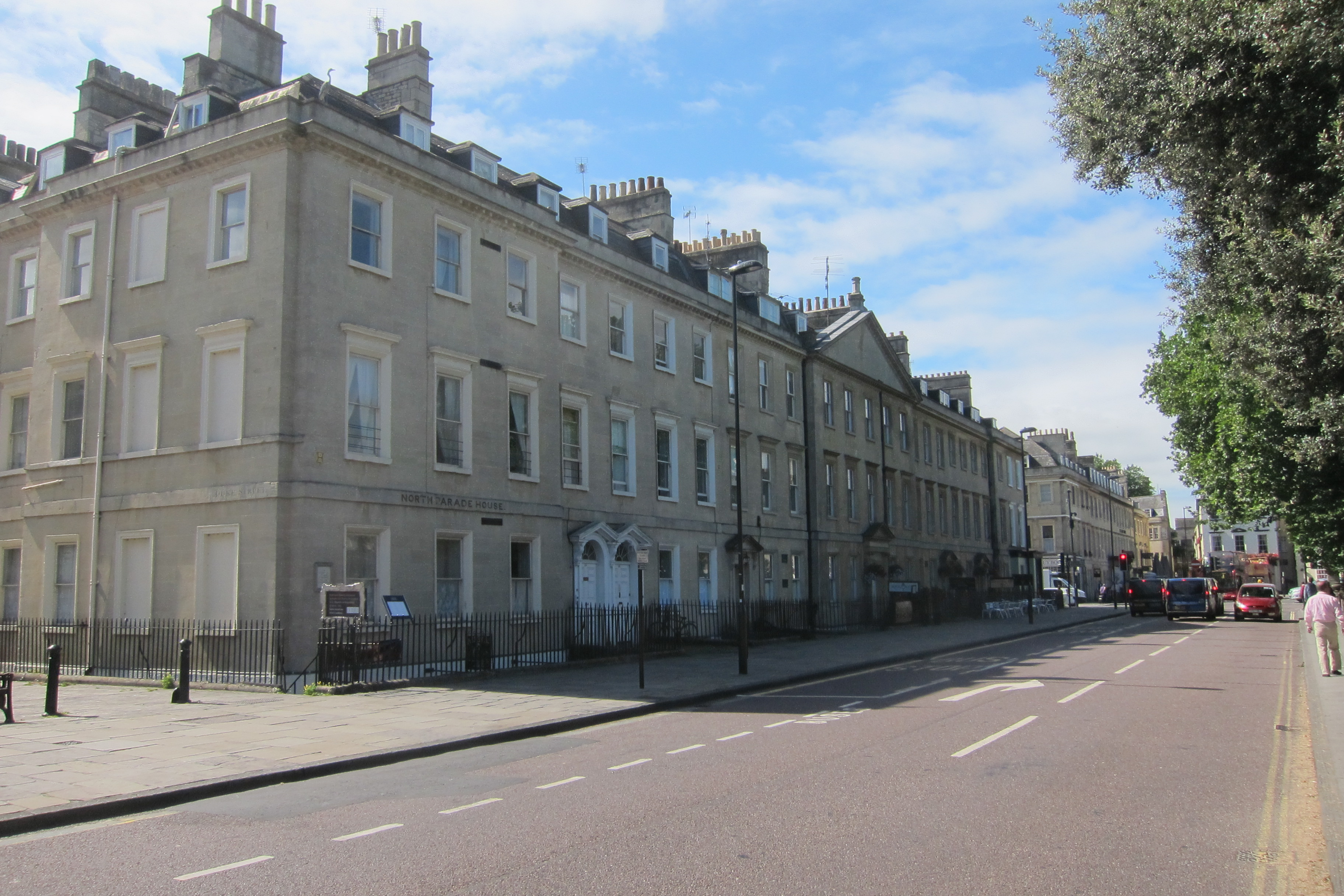
North Parade, Bath

- Auberge de Castille in Valletta, Malta, remodelled to a plan attributed to Andrea Belli.
- New building for the Royal Infirmary of Edinburgh in Scotland, designed by William Adam, opens.
- Mineral Water Hospital, Bath, England, designed by John Wood, the Elder, completed
- North Parade, Bath, designed by John Wood, completed about this date.
- Santissimo Nome di Maria al Foro Traiano in Rome, designed by Antoine Derizet, completed about this date.
- Construction begins on the following Palladian style buildings
  - The Berlin Court Opera, to a design by Georg Wenzeslaus von Knobelsdorff.
  - Russborough House in Ireland, to a design by Richard Cassels.
- Construction begins on Hôtel de Ville, Wissembourg

== Births ==
- April 1 – George Dance the Younger, English architect (d. 1825)
- October 3 – Johann Christian von Mannlich, German painter and architect (d. 1822)
- December 16 – Erik Palmstedt, Swedish architect (d. 1803)

== Deaths ==
- May 3 – Josef Munggenast, Austrian architect (b. 1680)
- October 13 – Jean Aubert, French architect (b. c.1680)
