= San Bernardo della Compagnia =

Church building in Rome, Italy

San Bernardo della Compagnia (also known as San Bernardo a Colonna Traiani, San Bernardi ad Columnam Traiani or San Bernardo della Compagnia al Foro) was a small church in Rome, next to Trajan's Column, dedicated to Saint Bernard and the Virgin Mary.

== History ==
The church was first built in 1418 by Francesco dei Foschi of a noble Roman family, near his house next to the column of Trajan under the pontificate of Martin V. He transferred into it a fraternity of laymen and of priests from the small church of three fountains outside the Porta San Paolo. Annexed to the church in the garden he established a small cemetery for the fraternity and to this he also gave all his rich property in 1440 to use for the church and for the poor. He wanted two days' food to be distributed free to forty poor families every Sunday. These brothers lived in the house. Pope Eugene IV gave them an ancient icon of the Virgin that used to be venerated in the Oratory of San Lorenzo in Laterano. On festival days they would gathered in their church to pray in front an icon.

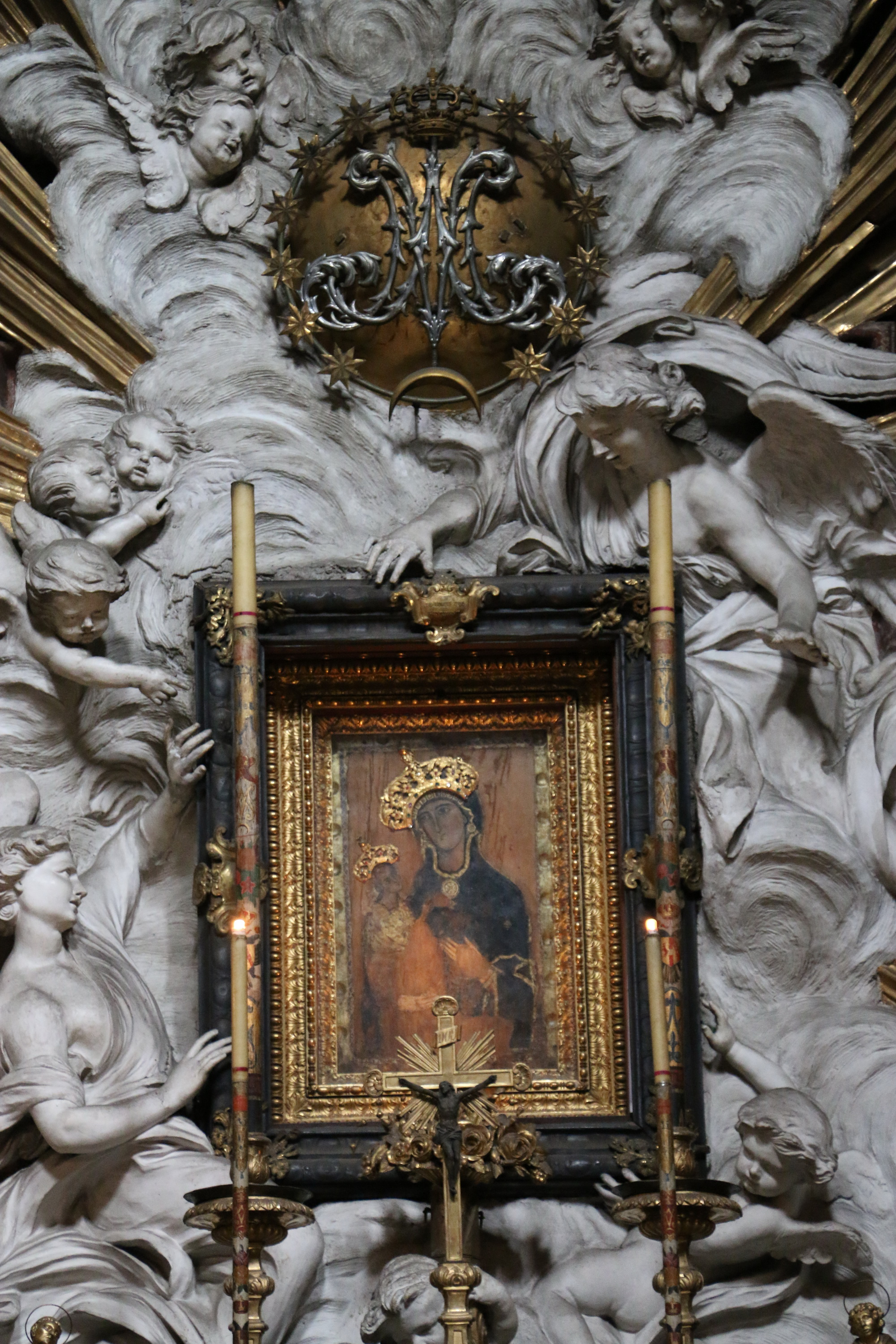
Rome, Chiesa del Santissimo Nome di Maria al Foro Traiano

In 1563, Pope Pius IV assigned the Church of Santo Stefano de Pinea to the Sylvestrine Fathers. In 1685, in celebration of the victory of the Holy League against the Ottoman Empire at the Battle of Vienna on 12 September 1683, Abbot Giuseppe Bianchi, O.S.B. Silv., instituted the devotion of the Most Holy Name of Mary at Santo Stefano del Cacco, and soon afterwards established the Confraternity of the Most Holy Name of Mary dedicated to feeding the poor. The confraternity was formally approved in 1688.

By the 17th century the ancient company of S. Bernardo was almost extinguished. In September 1694, the Confraternity of the Most Holy Name of Mary moved to San Bernardo a Colonna Traiani. It was subsequently raised to an Archconfraternity. In 1703, the icon was crowned by the Vatican Chapter.

Realizing that they needed to build a new church, the Archconfraternity acquired the adjacent plot and had Santissimo Nome di Maria built. It was completed in 1741, and the icon was transferred to the new church. San Bernardo was demolished in 1748. Every year up until 1870, the members would walk in procession on the Feast of the Holy Name of Mary to the church of Santa Maria della Vittoria, stopping at the Quirinal Palace for the pope's blessing.

The icon of Mary now hangs above the high altar of Santissimo Nome di Maria. On its case is the inscription: FRANCSICVS DE FUSCIS HUIUS ECCLESIAE ET SOCIETATIS FUNDATOR HIC IACET ANNO MCCCCLXVIII. Once a year, it is taken in solemn procession from the site of the now destroyed church of San Bernardo to its present place in the Nome di Maria church.
