= Borgognoni =

Borgognoni is an Italian surname that may refer to

- Luciano Borgognoni (1951–2014), Italian cyclist
- Theodoric Borgognoni (1205–1296/8), Italian surgeon

== See also ==
- Santi Claudio e Andrea dei Borgognoni, a French Roman Catholic national church in Rome, Italy
