= Special Administration of the Holy See =

The Special Administration of the Holy See (Italian: Amministrazione Speciale della Santa Sede, nicknamed La Speciale, abbreviated ASSS) was a dicastery of the Roman Curia from 1929 to 1967. It was established motu proprio by Pope Pius XI on 7 June 1929 to manage the ₤750 million in cash and 1,000 million in Italian government bonds transferred to the Holy See in implementation of the Financial Convention attached to the Lateran Treaty of 1929. The ASSS depended directly on the Supreme Pontiff. The ASSS marked the Vatican's transition from being financed by collecting from its faithful organization, to being financed through capitalistic investments.

Bernardino Nogara managed the Administration's fund, diversifying its assets to become a shareholder in most of Italia's large companies. The Banco di Roma fell under his administration. In 1941, Nogara turned the CPAOR (former structure used to receive donations) into a private bank to facilitate La Speciale's management.

Numerous investments were made in the USA after the 1929 crisis. The goal was to safeguard the Vatican's large funds and assets by transferring them from Europe to US-managed structures through the ASSS during the rise of the Third Reich. Significant gold reserves were also moved overseas, and hefty investments were made in U.S. Treasury Bills. The Vatican's money was arguably a major dynamic in the US' financing of WWII.

The ASSS purchased many lands in Switzerland before the Lex Koller.

Henry de Maillardoz from Freiburg was also a director of the ASSS from 1954 to 1967. During his mandate, he slowly transferred the Special Administration's assets to the CPAOR private bank.

In 1967, Pope Paul VI combined the Special Administration of the Holy See and the Administration of the Property of the Holy See into one office, the Administration of the Patrimony of the Apostolic See, erected on 15 August 1967.

== See also ==
- Administration of the Patrimony of the Apostolic See
- Administration of the Property of the Holy See

== Directors ==
1. Bernardino Nogara (1929—1954)
2. Henri de Maillardoz (1954—1967)

== Secretaries of the Cardinalitial Commission ==
- Alberto di Jorio (1940 — 1947)
- Nicola Canali (1952 — 1961)

== Bibliography ==
- Lo Bello, Nino (1968). The Vatican Empire. Trident Press, New York.
- Pollard, John F. (1999). "The Vatican and the Wall Street Crash: Bernardino Nogara and the Papal Finances in the early 1930s." The Historical Journal, 42: 1077-1091.
- Pollard, John F. (2005). Money and the Rise of the Modern Papacy: Financing the Vatican, 1850–1950. Cambridge University Press.
- Malachi Martin - Rich Church, Poor Church (Putnam, New York, 1984) ISBN 0-399-12906-5
- Williams, Paul L. (1 May 2003). Vatican Exposed: Money, Murder, and the Mafia. Prometheus. ISBN 978-1591020653.
