= Santo Stefano del Cacco =

Church in Rome

Santo Stefano de Pinea
- Santo Stefano del Cacco
- Click on the map for a fullscreen view
- 41°53′50″N 12°28′45″E
- Location: Via di Santo Stefano del Cacco 26, Rome
- Country: Italy
- Denomination: Roman Catholic

History
- Dedication: Saint Stephen

Santo Stefano de Pinea (Note: Its most ancient name, referring to its Rione – the Rione Pigna – and to the "pigna" or pine cone that surmounts its bell-tower.) or more commonly Santo Stefano del Cacco is a church in Rome dedicated to Saint Stephen, located at Via di Santo Stefano del Cacco 26.

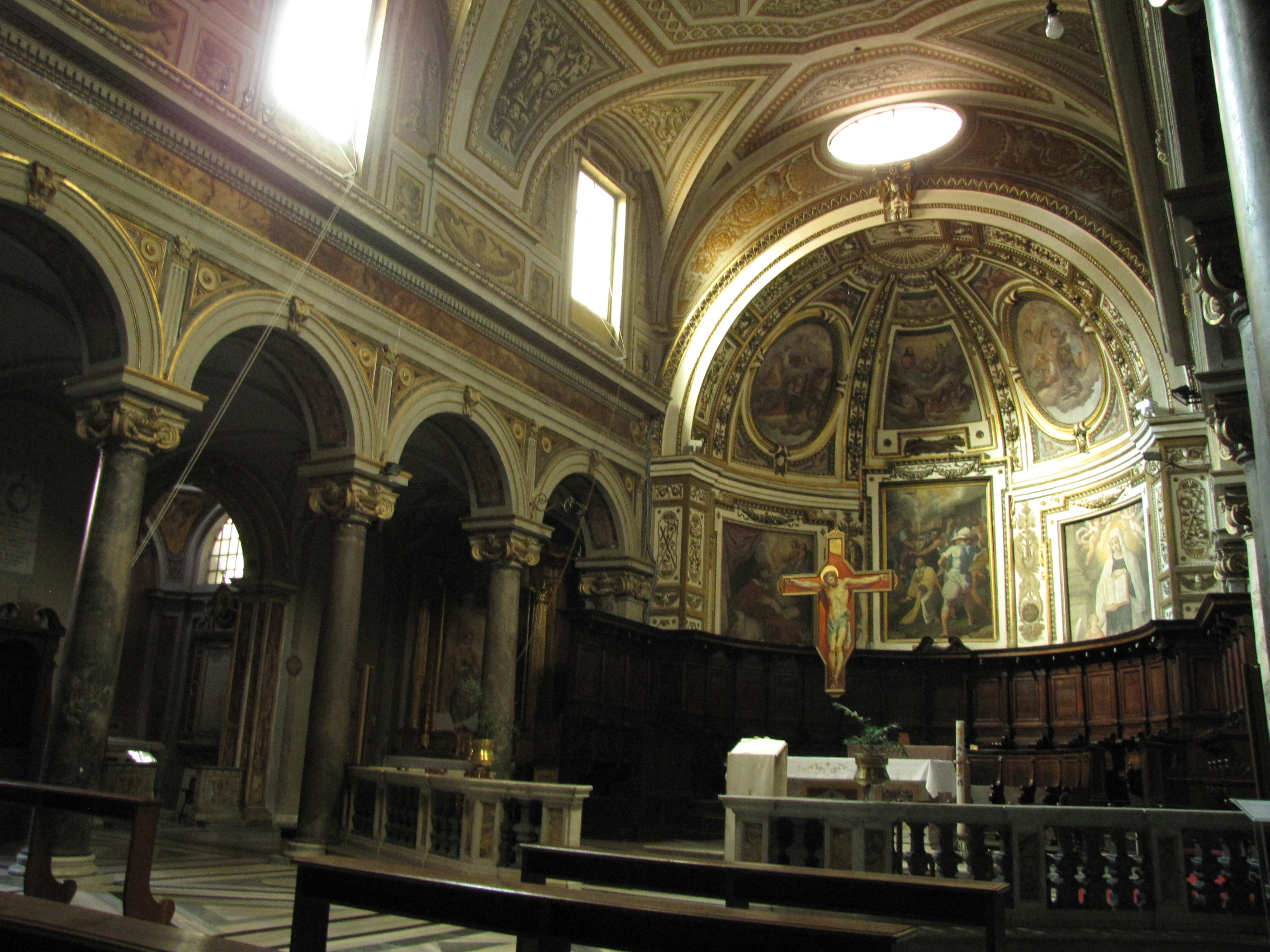
Santo Stefano del Cacco (Roma)

== Name ==
The name "del Cacco" may refer to the Roman deity Cacus, or more likely to a statue of the dog-headed (baboon, actually) ancient Egyptian god Thoth (from the temple of the ancient Egyptian deities Isis and Serapis, the Iseum Campense, built in 43 BC, on whose ruins the church was originally built and twelve columns from which were re-used in the church's nave), misunderstood as a monkey or "Macaco" (later corrupted to Cacco).

== History ==
Its construction date is uncertain, though it is assumed to have been in the reign of Pope Hadrian I (772–795). It was definitely in existence at the time of Pope Paschal I (817-824), who added an apsidal mosaic (lost in the 1607 rebuild) of himself. Under Paschal II (1099–1118), the painters Gregorius and Petrolinus were employed to work on the church's apsidal decoration. A new bell-tower (not visible from the street) was built in 1160, and still survives as part of the nearby monastery.

In 1563, it was assigned by Pope Pius IV (1559–1565) to the Sylvestrine Fathers, by whom it is still run, and they soon carried out a minor restoration. Abbot Giuseppe Bianchi, O.S.B. Silv., from Sabina, instituted the devotion of the Most Holy Name of Mary in 1685 at Santo Stefano del Cacco, and soon afterwards established the Confraternity of the Most Holy Name of Mary dedicated to feeding the poor, which was formally approved in 1688. The confraternity moved to Santissimo Nome di Maria al Foro Traiano in Rome in 1694.

In 1940, the church was threatened with demolition due to the expansion of the central police station in the neighbouring former monastery of Santa Marta, although this was averted.

== Architecture ==
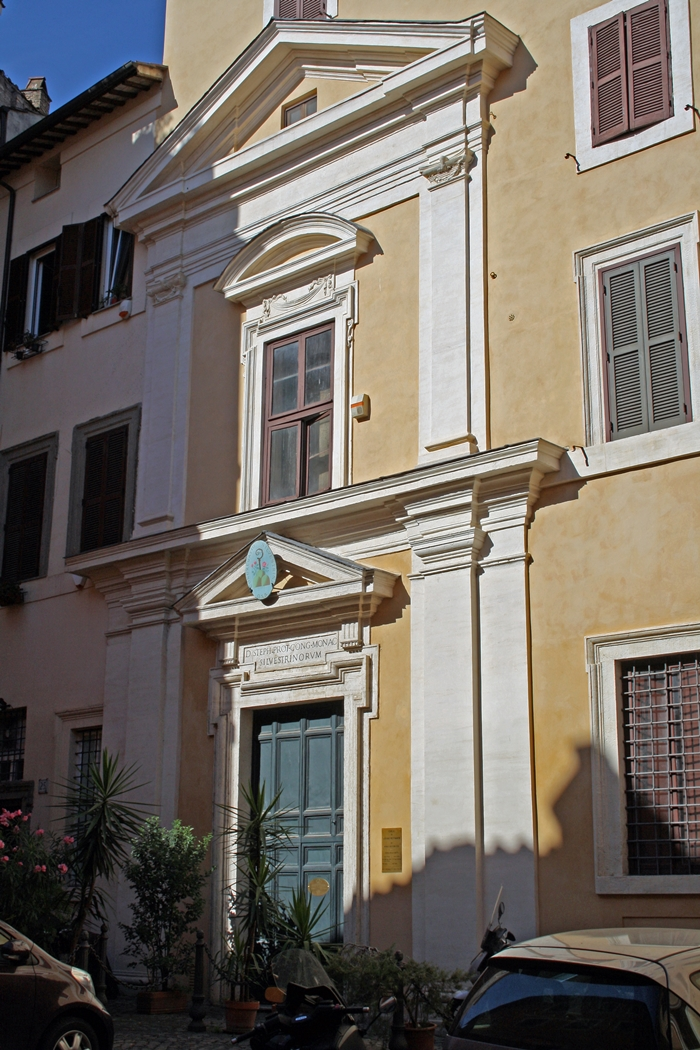
Facade.

Paolo Marucelli (1594–1649) designed the church's travertine portal, flanked by pilasters and surmounted by a triangular pediment, and the plate above it reads: D. STEPH. PROT. CONG. MONAC. / SILVESTRINORVM ("Dedicated to St. Stephen the Protomartyr, the Congregation of the Silvestrine Monks"). On the sides of the portal were once located the two basalt lions, coming from the "Temple of Isis", and subsequently placed by Michelangelo at the base of the Cordonata.

The façade's second order includes a window crowned with a segmented pediment and flanking pilasters, and right at the top is a triangular pediment with a small window, a rare feature in Roman churches.

Restorations and renovations occurred in 1607 (gutting the apse), c.1640 (giving the church its current baroque appearance, with a simple 2-storey façade, probably by Antonio Canziani).

== Interior ==
There is a frescoed Pieta by Perino del Vaga, and in the apse the "Martyrdom of S.Stefano by Cristoforo Casolani. In the mid-19th century, the floor was re-laid with marble salvaged from the burnt-out San Paolo fuori le Mura.

== Sources ==
- Santo Stefano del Cacco
