= San Luigi dei Francesi =

Church of St. Louis of the French
- San Luigi dei Francesi (Italian); S. Ludovici Francorum de Urbe (Latin); Saint Louis des Français (French)
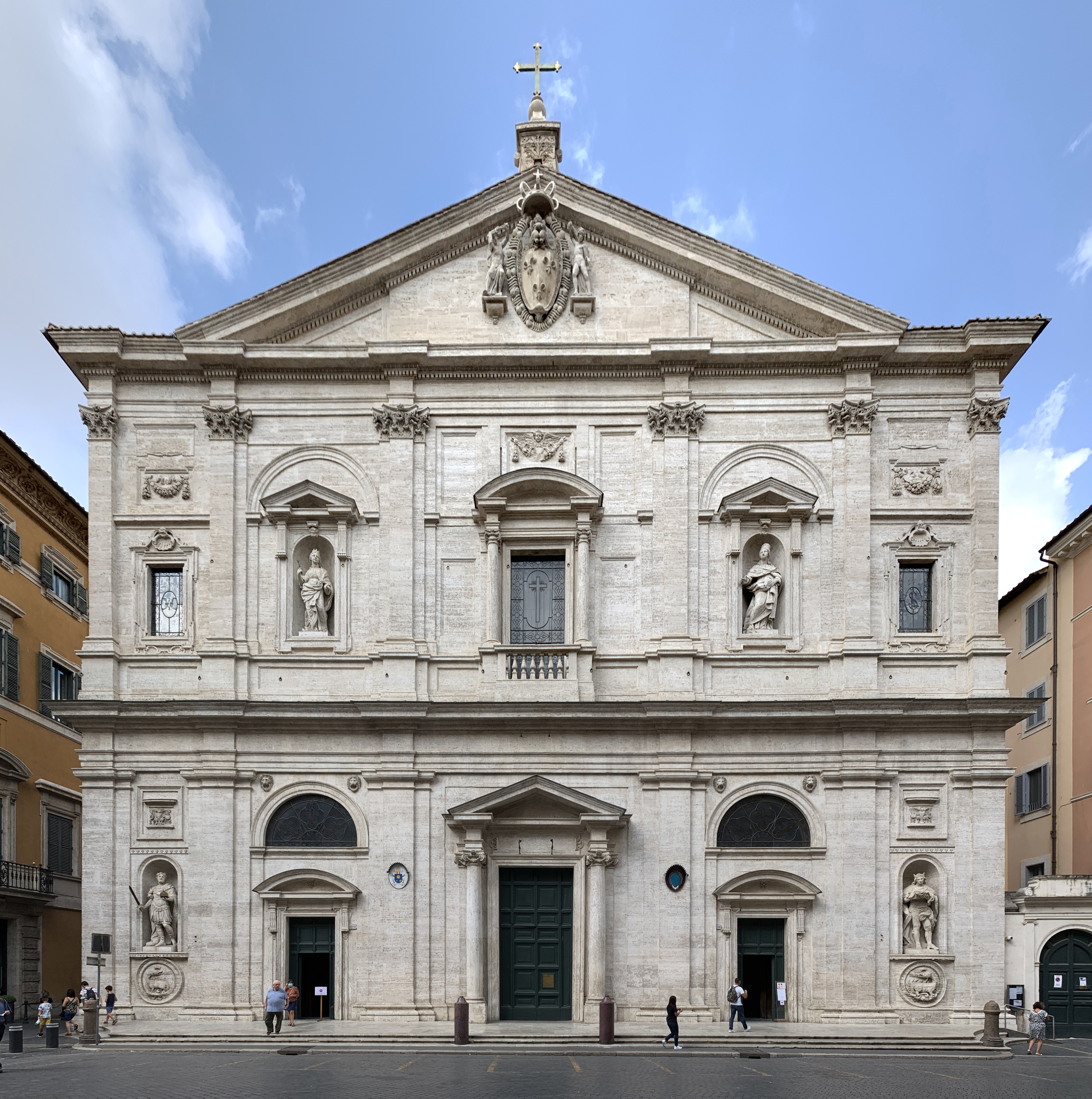
- Façade of San Luigi dei Francesi, National Church in Rome of France.
- Click on the map to see marker
- 41°53′59″N 12°28′29″E
- Location: Piazza di S. Luigi de Francesi, Rome
- Country: Italy
- Denomination: Catholic Church
- Tradition: Latin Church
- Website: www.saintlouis-rome.net

History
- Status: Titular church, national church
- Dedication: Saint Louis IX of France

Architecture
- Architect(s): Giacomo della Porta; Domenico Fontana
- Architectural type: Church
- Style: Baroque
- Completed: 1589

Specifications
- Length: 51 metres (167 ft)
- Width: 35 metres (115 ft)

The Church of St. Louis of the French (Italian: San Luigi dei Francesi, French: Saint Louis des Français, Latin: S. Ludovici Francorum de Urbe) is a Catholic church near Piazza Navona in Rome. The church is dedicated to the patron saints of France: Virgin Mary, Denis of Paris, and King Louis IX of France.

The church was designed by Giacomo della Porta and built by Domenico Fontana between 1518 and 1589, and completed through the personal intervention of Catherine de' Medici, who donated to it some property in the area. It is the national church in Rome of France. It is also a titular church.

== History ==
When the Saracens burned the Abbey of Farfa in 898, a group of refugees settled in Rome. Some monks remained in Rome even after their abbot Ratfredus (934–936) rebuilt the abbey. By the end of the tenth century, the Abbey of Farfa owned in Rome churches, houses, windmills and vineyards. A bull of Holy Roman Emperor Otto III in 998 confirms the property of three churches: Santa Maria, San Benedetto and the oratorio of San Salvatore. When they ceded their property to the Medici family in 1480, the church of Santa Maria became the church of St. Louis of the French. Cardinal Giulio di Giuliano de' Medici commissioned Jean de Chenevières to build a church for the French community in 1518. Chenevières' design was for an octagonal, centrally planned edifice. Building was halted when Rome was sacked in 1527, and the church was finally completed in 1589 by Domenico Fontana and Giacomo della Porta, who designed the façade, according to an entirely different design. The church was consecrated by the Cardinal François de Joyeuse, Protector of France before the Holy See, on 8 October 1589. The interior was restored by Antoine Dérizet between 1749 and 1756.

The foundation Pieux Etablissements de la France à Rome et à Lorette is responsible for the five French churches in Rome and apartment buildings in Rome and in Loreto. The foundation is governed by an "administrative deputy" named by the French Ambassador to the Holy See.

== Exterior ==
Giacomo della Porta made the façade as a piece of decorative work entirely independent of the body of the structure, a method much copied later. The French character is evident from the façade itself, which has several statues recalling national history: these include Charlemagne, Saint Louis, Saint Clothilde and Saint Jeanne of Valois. The interior also has frescoes by Charles-Joseph Natoire recounting stories of Saint Louis IX, Saint Denis and Clovis.

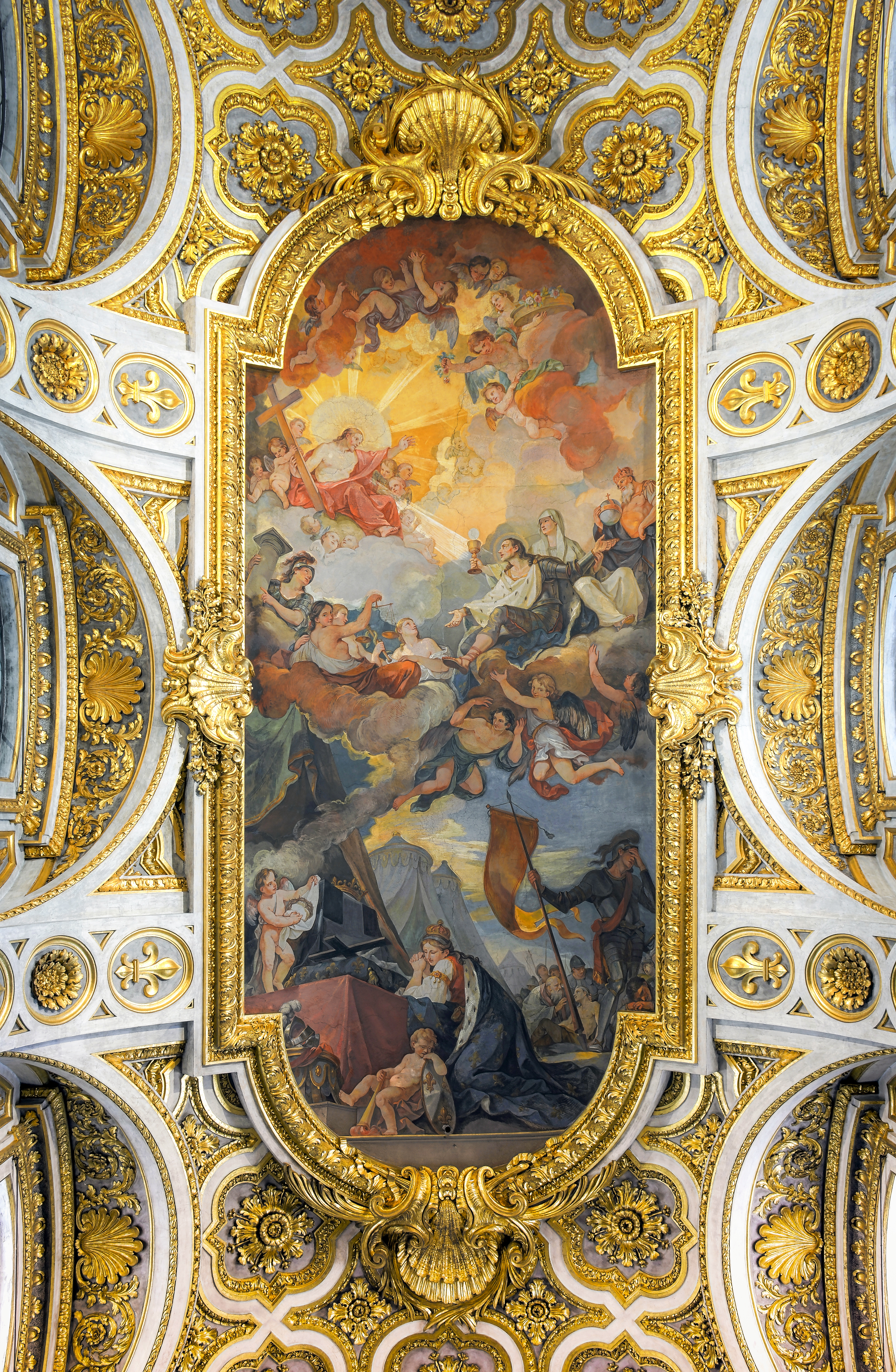
Ceiling by Charles-Joseph Natoire

== Interior ==
=== Contarelli (St. Matthew) Chapel ===
The Contarelli Chapel contains a cycle of paintings by the Baroque master Caravaggio in 1599–1600 about the life of Saint Matthew. This includes the three world-renowned canvases of The Calling of Saint Matthew (on the left wall), The Inspiration of Saint Matthew (above the altar), and The Martyrdom of Saint Matthew (on the right wall).

=== Polet Chapel ===
The Polet Chapel contains frescoes by Domenichino portraying the Histories of Saint Cecilia.

=== Other works ===
Other works in the church include pieces by Cavalier D'Arpino, Francesco Bassano il Giovane, Muziano, Giovanni Baglione, Siciolante da Sermoneta, Jacopino del Conte, Tibaldi and Antoine Derizet.

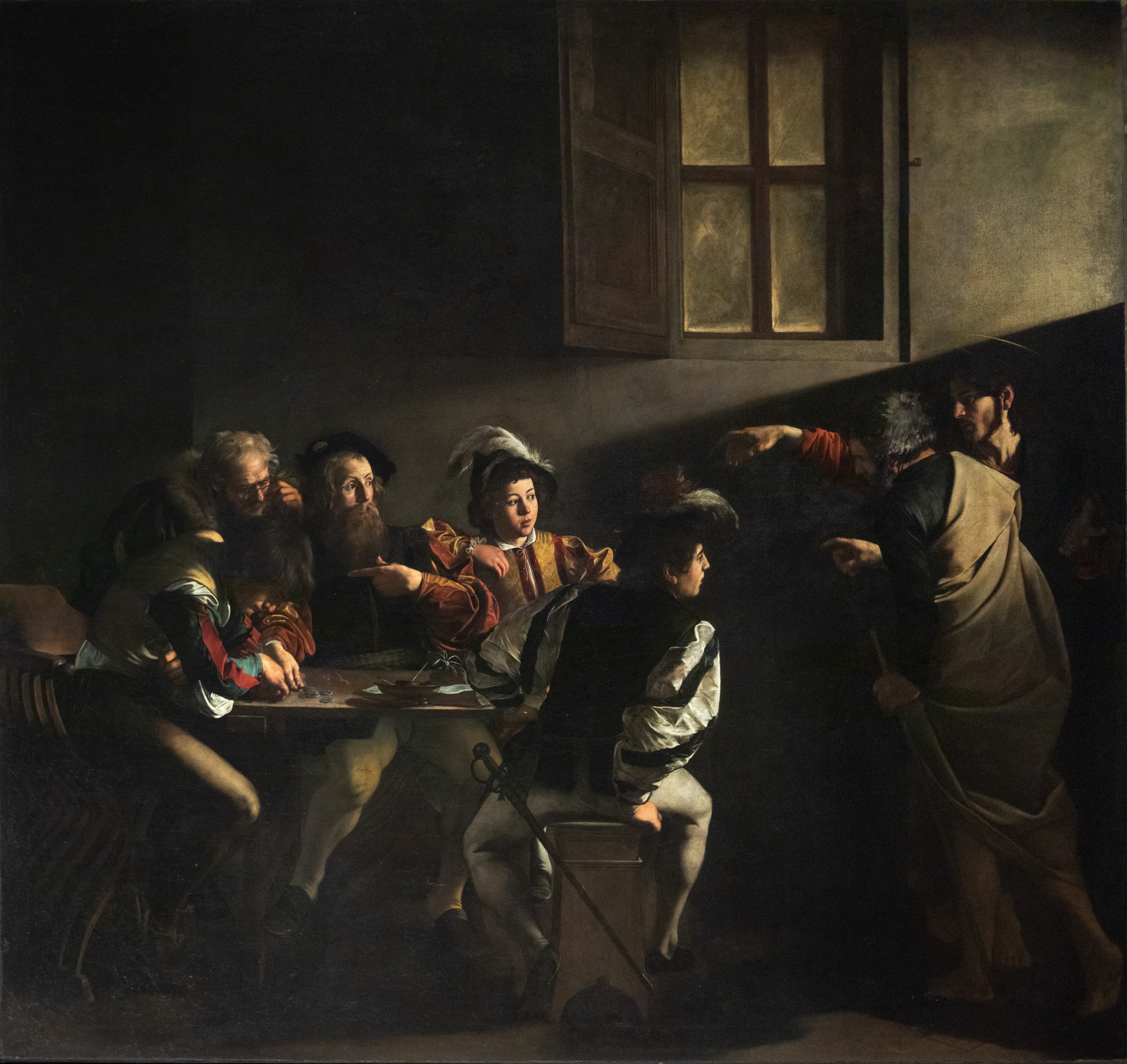
The Calling of Saint Matthew

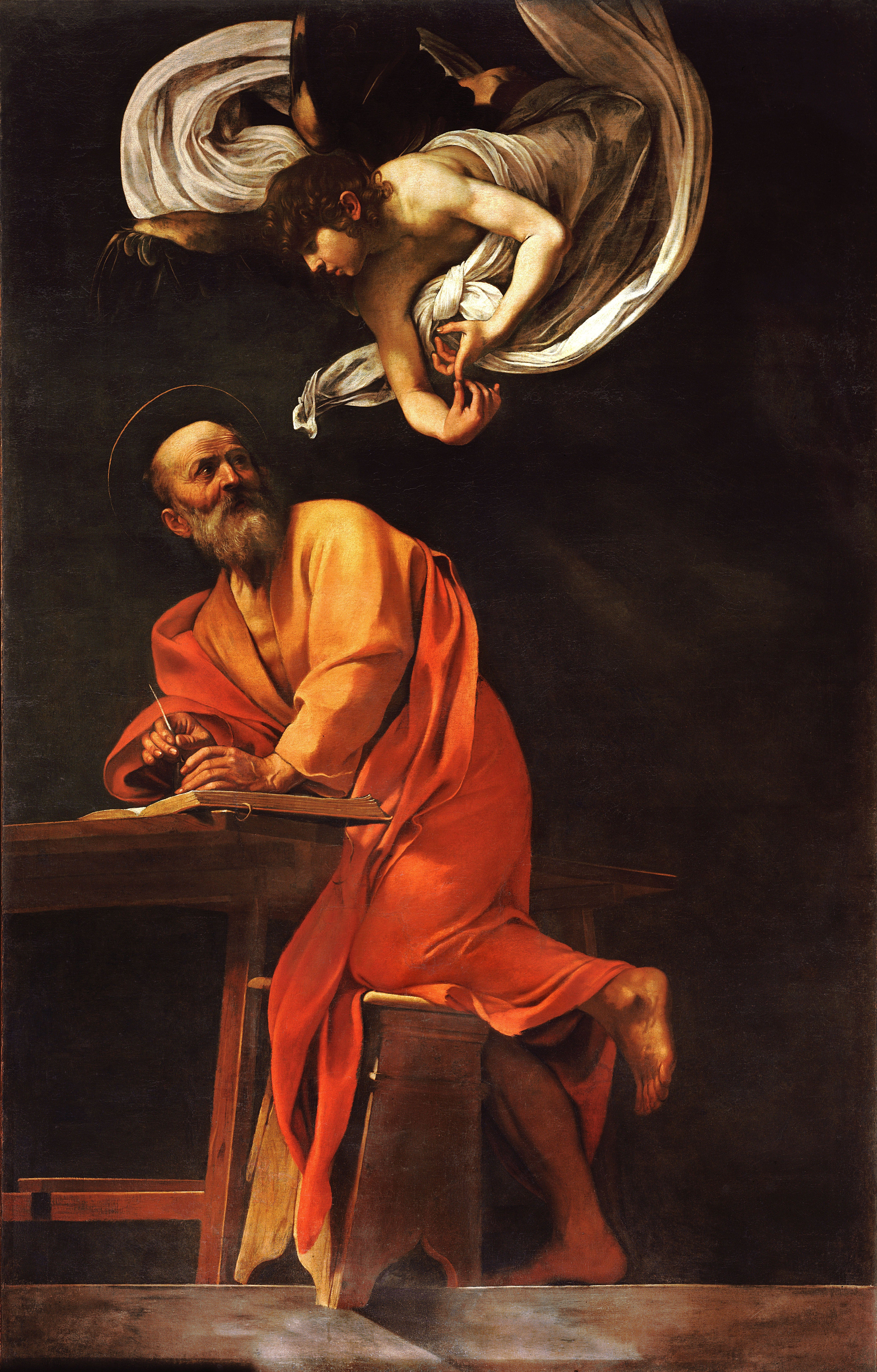
The Inspiration of Saint Matthew

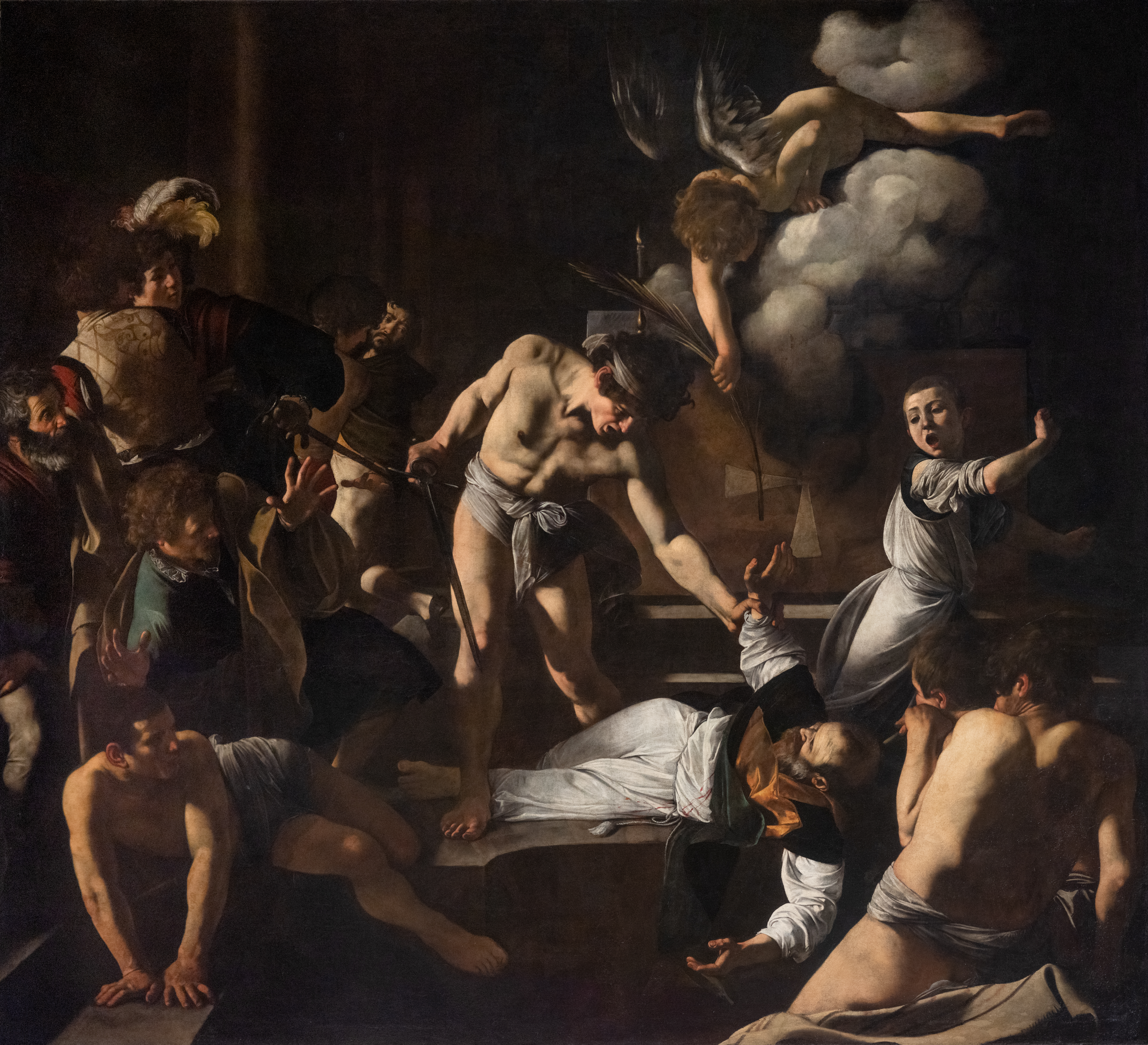
The Martyrdom of Saint Matthew

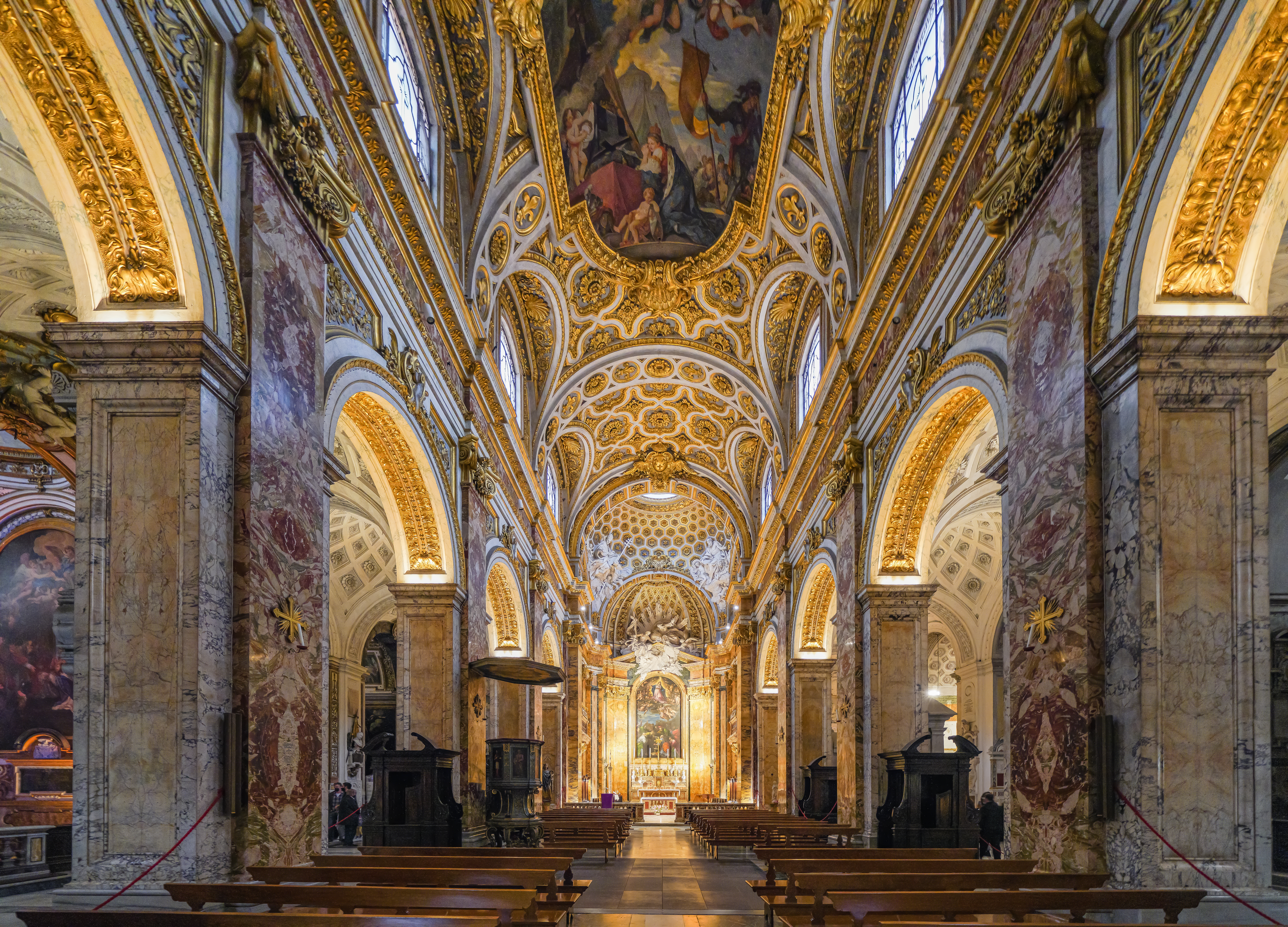
Interior

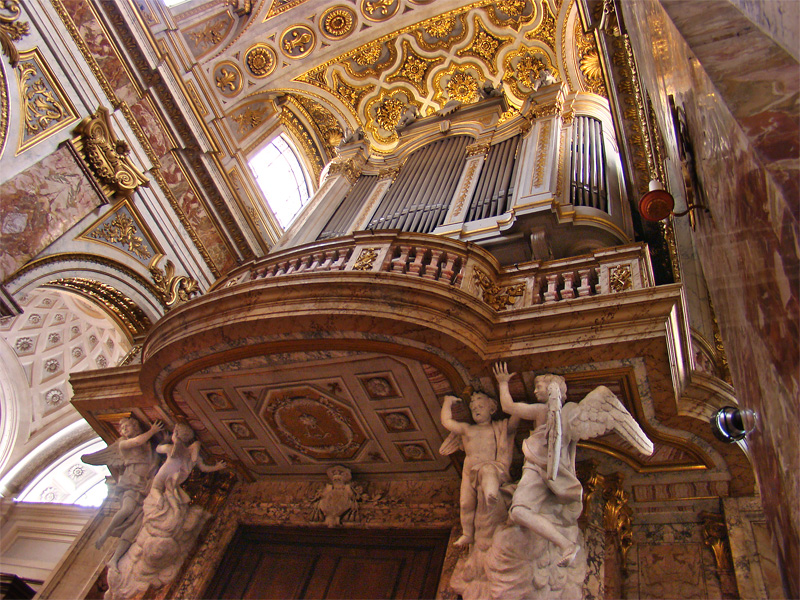
Merklin organ

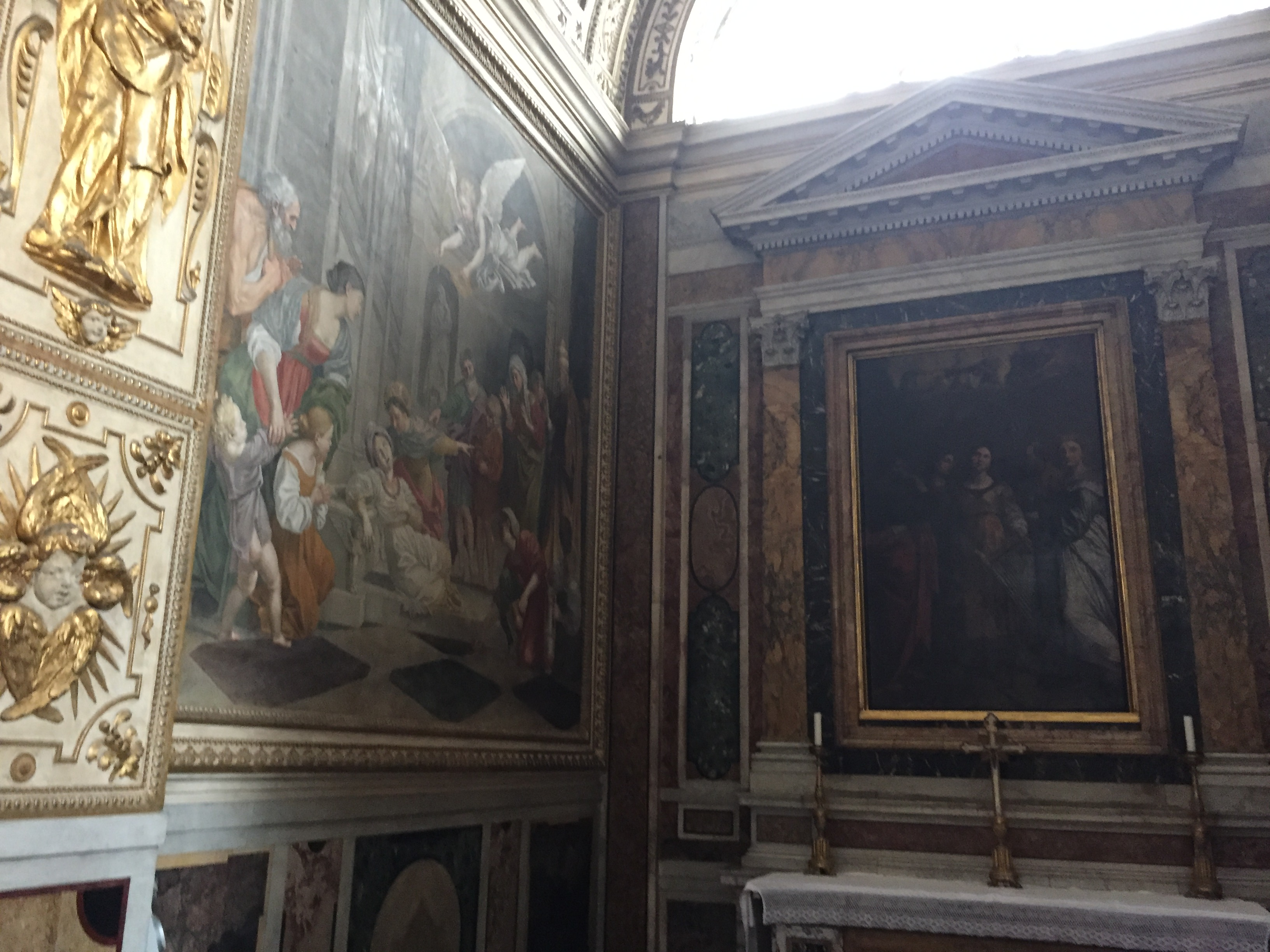
Polet Chapel

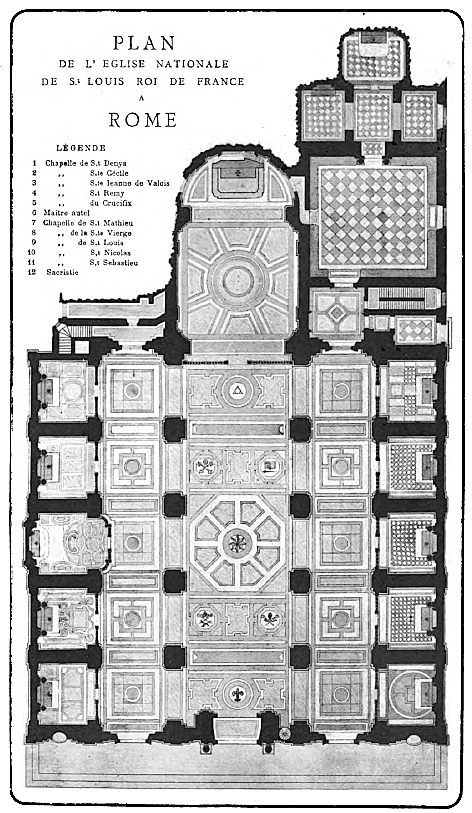
Plan of the church

=== Burials ===
The church was chosen as the burial place for a number of higher prelates and members of the French community of Rome: these include the classic liberal economist Frédéric Bastiat, Cardinal François-Joachim de Pierre de Bernis, ambassador in Rome for Louis XV and Louis XVI, and Henri Cleutin, the French Lieutenant in 16th-century Scotland. There is also the tomb of Pauline de Beaumont, who died of consumption in Rome in 1805, erected by her lover Chateaubriand. The sculptor Pierre Le Gros the Younger is buried here in an unmarked grave. The painter Antoniazzo Romano is buried here as well.

The inscriptions found in San Luigi dei Francesi, a valuable source illustrating the history of the church, have been collected and published by Vincenzo Forcella.

== Ospizio San Luigi dei Francesi ==
Adjacent to the church is the late-Baroque Ospizio San Luigi dei Francesi. It was built in 1709–1716 as a place to stay for the French religious community and pilgrims without resources. Its porch has a bust of Christ whose face is traditionally identified as Cesare Borgia's. The interior houses a gallery with portraits of the French kings and a notable Music Hall.

== Cardinal-Priests of San Luigi dei Francesi ==
The Church of St. Louis was designated as a cardinalatial titulus on 7 June 1967, by Pope Paul VI. Its titulars have to date all been archbishops of Paris:

- Pierre Veuillot (29 June 1967 – 14 February 1968)
- François Marty (30 April 1969 – 16 February 1994)
- Jean-Marie Lustiger (26 November 1994 – 5 August 2007)
- André Armand Vingt-Trois (24 November 2007 – 18 July 2025)

== Organists ==
- Giovanni Marciani, organist from 1649-1653

== Sources ==
- Patrizia Tosini, Natalia Gozzano (editors), La Cappella Contarelli in San Luigi dei Francesi (Roma: Gangemi Editore, 2012).
- Calogero Bellanca, Oliva Muratore, O. Muratore, Una didattica per il restauro II: esperienze a San Luigi dei Francesi e San Nicola dei Lorenesi (Firenze: Alinea, 2009).
- Sebastiano Roberto, San Luigi dei Francesi: la fabbrica di una chiesa nazionale nella Roma del '500 (Roma: Gangemi, 2005).
- Claudio Rendina, Enciclopedia di Roma. Newton Compton, Rome, 1999.
- Francesco Quinterio, Franco Borsi, Luciano Tubello, Il palazzo dei senatori a San Luigi de' Francesi (Roma: Editalia, 1990).
- Albert Armailhacq, L' église nationale de Saint Louis des Français a Rome: notes historiques et descriptives (Rome: Philip Cuggiani 1894).
- Jean Arnaud, Mémoire historique sur les Institutions de la France à Rome, 2nd edition (Rome: Editrice Romana 1892).
