= Santissimo Nome di Maria al Foro Traiano =

Church of the Most Holy Name of Mary at the Trajan Forum
- Santissimo Nome di Maria al Foro Traiano (in Italian); Ss. Nominis Mariae ad forum Traiani (in Latin)
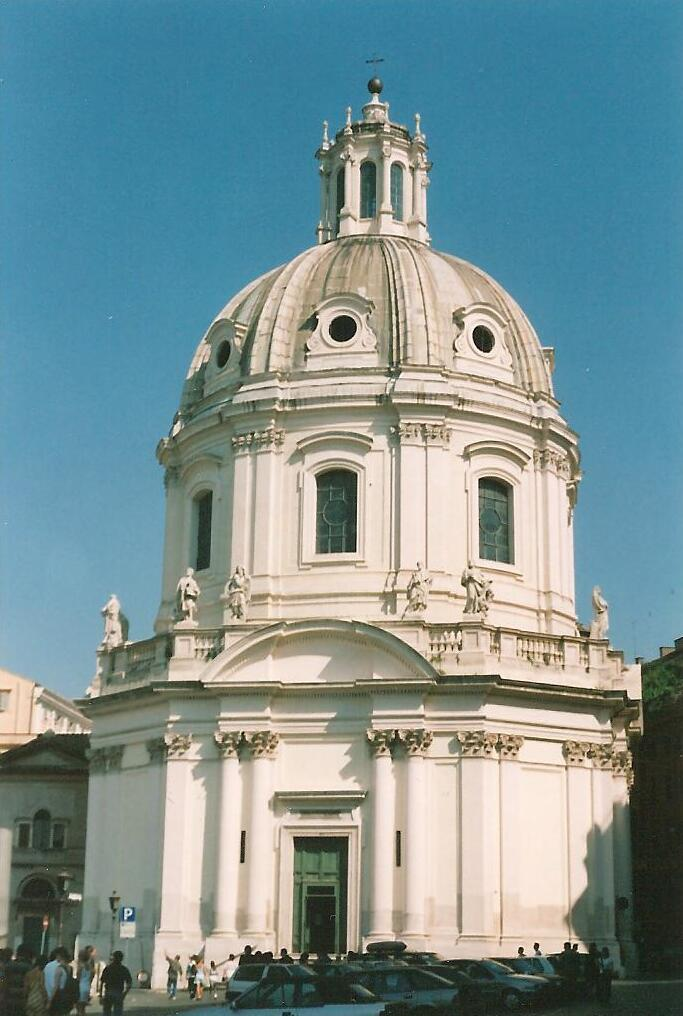
- Facade
- Click on the map for a fullscreen view
- 41°53′46.11″N 12°29′04.40″E
- Location: Foro Traiano 89, Rome
- Country: Italy
- Denomination: Roman Catholic
- Tradition: Roman Rite

History
- Status: Titular Church
- Dedication: Most Holy Name of the Blessed Virgin Mary

Architecture
- Architect: Antoine Derizet
- Architectural type: Church
- Style: Baroque
- Groundbreaking: 1736
- Completed: 1751

Specifications
- Length: 30 metres (98 ft)
- Width: 25 metres (82 ft)

The Church of the Most Holy Name of Mary at the Trajan Forum (Italian: Santissimo Nome di Maria al Foro Traiano, Latin: Ss. Nominis Mariae ad forum Traiani) is a Roman Catholic church in Rome, Italy. This church should not be confused with the church Santissimo Nome di Maria in Via Latina in south-east Rome.

The pale marble church stands in front of the Column of Trajan, a few dozen steps from the similarly domed, but externally more colorful, church of Santa Maria di Loreto.

== History ==
The feast of the Holy Name of Mary was instituted by Pope Innocent XI after the victory of the Austrian-Polish armies under the command of John III Sobieski over the Turks at the Battle of Vienna in 1683. Abbot Giuseppe Bianchi instituted devotion to the most holy name of Mary in 1685 at Santo Stefano del Cacco, and soon afterwards established the Confraternity of the Most Holy Name of Mary, which was formally approved in 1688. Members included Pope Innocent XI and Leopold I, Holy Roman Emperor. It was later raised to an Archconfraternity. Every year up until 1870, the members would walk in procession on the Feast of the Holy Name of Mary to the church of Santa Maria della Vittoria, stopping at the Quirinal Palace for the pope's blessing.

In 1694, the confraternity moved to San Bernardo a Colonna Traiani, but the next year, realizing that they needed to build a new church, they acquired the adjacent plot and had Santissimo Nome di Maria built by the French architect Antoine Derizet (1736-1741).

In 1748, San Bernardo was demolished, but the icon of Mary had been transferred from it to the new church in 1741. The icon, previously in the Sancta Sanctorum at the Lateran Palace, had been given to San Bernardo in the 15th century by Pope Eugene IV. Once a year, it is carried in solemn procession from the site of San Bernardo to its present place above the high altar of Santissimo Nome di Maria.

During the Nazi persecution, some Jews found refuge in the church's basement.

The church is owned by the “Archconfraternity of the Most Holy Name of Mary at the Trajan Forum” and is still its seat. The church is also a subsidiary place of worship of the parish of the Holy Twelve Apostles.

In addition, the church is under the protection of the House of Habsburg, and after the fall of the Austro-Hungarian Empire under the protection of the Austrian nation.

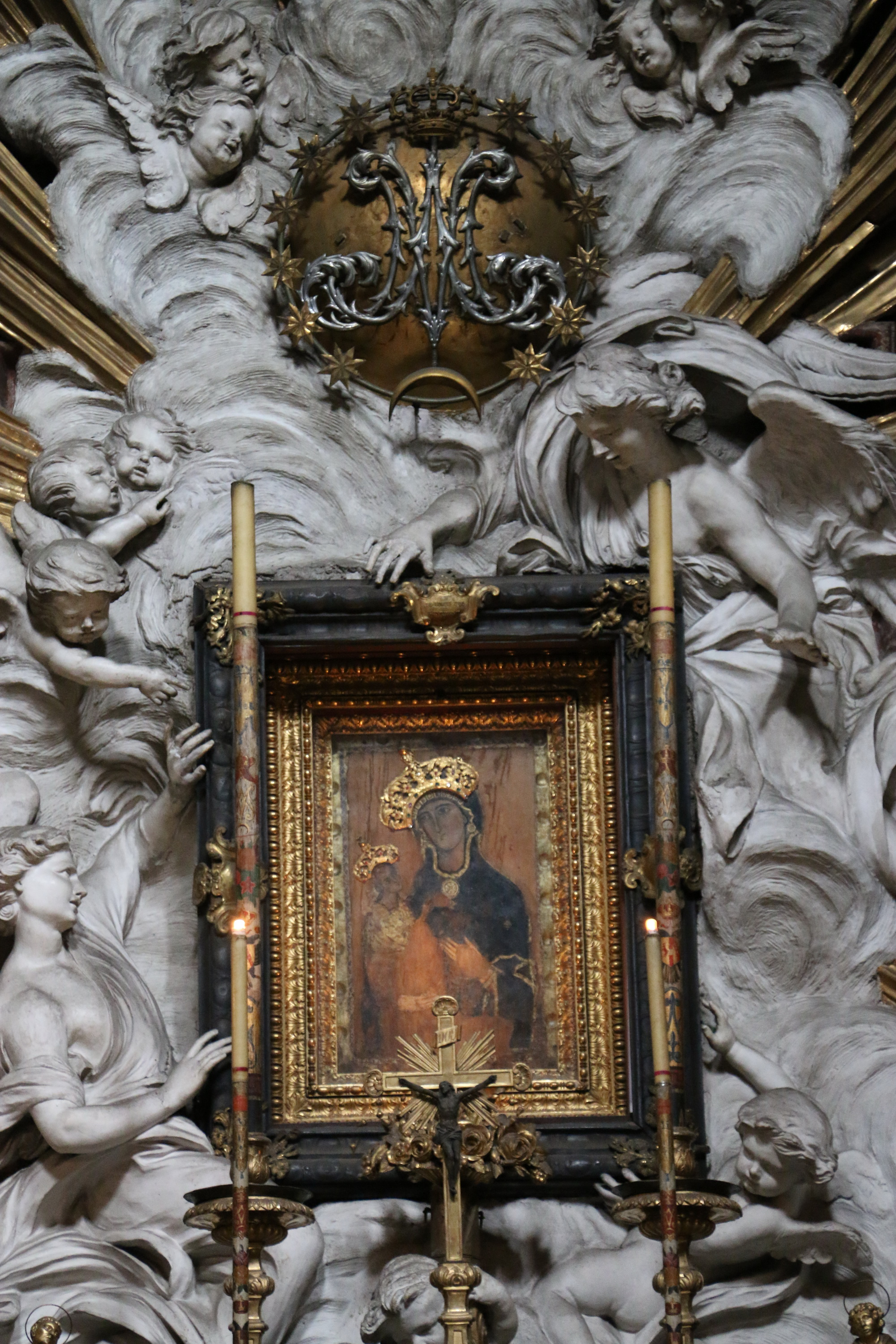
Chiesa del Santissimo Nome di Maria al Foro Traiano

== Description ==
The lower exterior is decorated by columns and pilasters. The balustrade separating the two orders features statues of the evangelists and prophets. At the top of the dome is a lantern. In 2020 new stained glass door was installed in the entrance.

The interior is elliptical. Mauro Fontana and Agostino Masucci oversaw the interior decoration of the church. The medallions adorning the dome are frescoed with “Stories from the Life of Mary.” A 12th century image of the Virgin and Child painted on wood is above on the high altar. Two double-head eagles with triple crowns are on the flanking pilasters of the high altar in memory of the special protection that the Emperor Leopold I wanted to grant from himself and his heirs. There are seven small chapels, decorated in polychrome marble.

== Titular holders ==
In 1969, Pope Paul VI made it a Titular Church. Cardinal-deacons of Santissimo Nome di Maria al Foro Traiano:

1. Sergio Guerri (28 April 1969 – 15 March 1992)
2. Darío Castrillón Hoyos (21 February 1998 – 18 May 2018)
3. Mauro Gambetti (28 November 2020 – present)

== See also ==
- 18th-century Western domes
