= The Calling of Saint Matthew =

Painting by Caravaggio

- Vocazione di San Matteo (Italian)
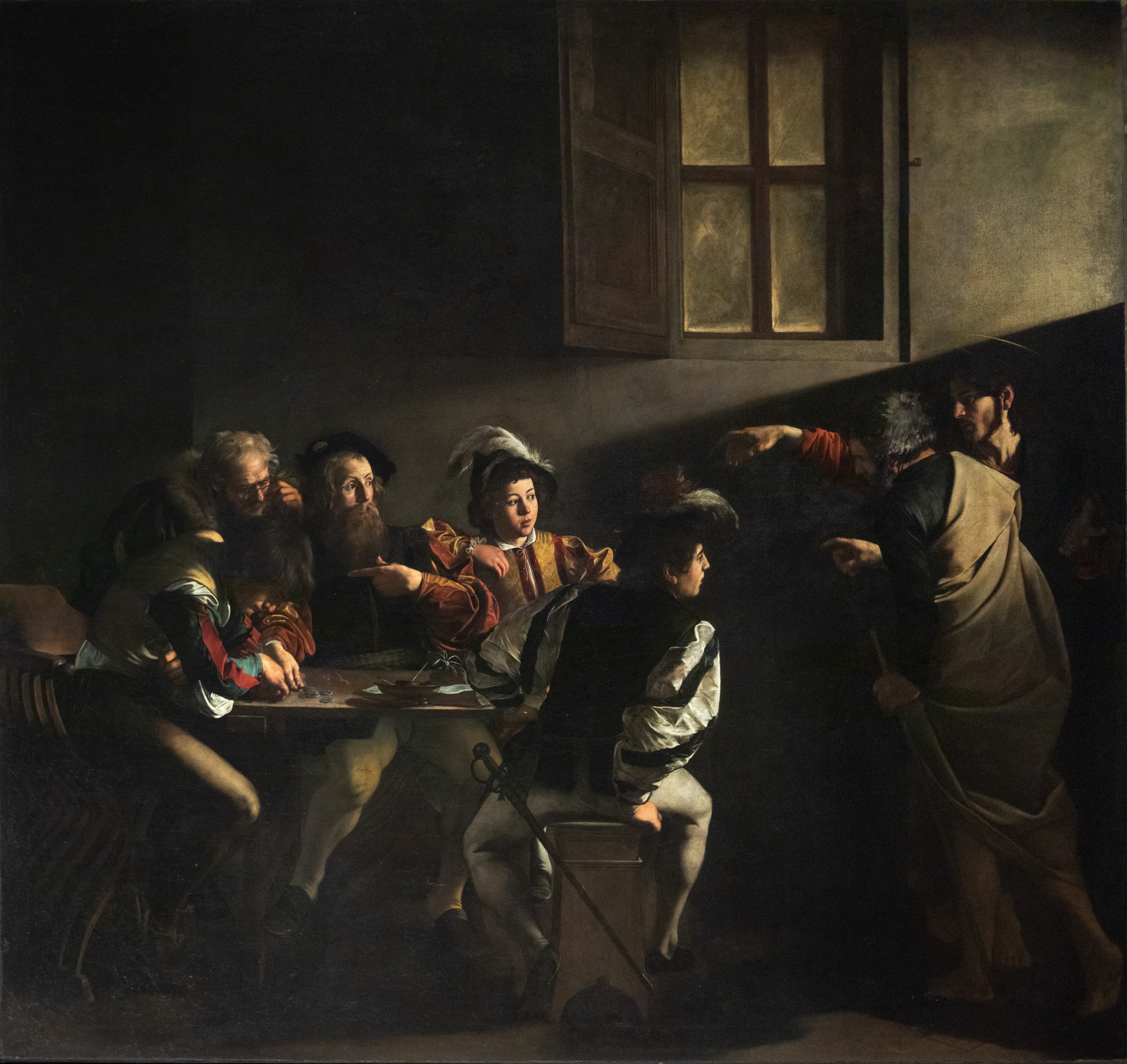
- Artist: Caravaggio
- Year: 1599–1600
- Medium: Oil on canvas
- Dimensions: 322 cm × 340 cm (127 in × 130 in)
- Location: San Luigi dei Francesi, Rome

The Calling of Saint Matthew is an oil painting by the Italian Baroque master Caravaggio that depicts the moment Jesus Christ calls on the tax collector Matthew to follow him. It was completed in 1599–1600 for the Contarelli Chapel in the church of the French congregation, San Luigi dei Francesi in Rome, where it remains. It hangs alongside two other paintings of Matthew by Caravaggio: The Martyrdom of Saint Matthew (painted around the same time as the Calling) and The Inspiration of Saint Matthew (1602).

== Commission ==
More than a decade earlier, Cardinal Matthieu Cointerel had left funds and specific instructions in his will for the decoration of a chapel based on themes related to his namesake, Saint Matthew. The dome of the chapel was decorated with frescoes by the late Mannerist artist Giuseppe Cesari, Caravaggio's former employer and one of the most popular painters in Rome at the time. But as Cesari became busy with royal and papal patronage, Cardinal Francesco Maria del Monte, Caravaggio's patron and also the prefect of the Fabbrica of St Peter's (the Vatican office for Church property), intervened to obtain for Caravaggio his first major church commission and his first painting with more than a handful of figures.

Caravaggio's Calling of Saint Matthew hangs opposite The Martyrdom of Saint Matthew. While the Martyrdom was probably the first to be started, the Calling was, by report, the first to be completed. The commission for these two lateral paintings — the Calling and the Martyrdom — is dated July 1599, and final payment was made in July 1600. Between the two, at the altar, is The Inspiration of Saint Matthew (1602).

== Subject matter ==
The painting depicts the story from the Gospel of Matthew (Matthew 9:9): "Jesus saw a man named Matthew at his seat in the custom house, and said to him, 'Follow me', and Matthew rose and followed Him." Caravaggio depicts Matthew the tax collector sitting at a table with four other men. Jesus Christ and Saint Peter have entered the room, and Jesus is pointing at Matthew. A beam of light illuminates the faces of the men at the table who are looking at Jesus Christ. This is a depiction of a moment of spiritual awakening and conversion, which was something many Baroque artists were interested in painting, especially Caravaggio.

== Identity of Matthew ==
Art historians generally identify Saint Matthew as the bearded man in the center. In this reading, he points to his own chest in disbelief ("Me?"), reacting to Christ's summons while preparing to rise. This identification is reinforced by the two companion paintings in the Contarelli Chapel (The Martyrdom and The Inspiration), where the same bearded model portrays Matthew.

An alternative hypothesis argues that the bearded man points instead at the young man counting coins at the far left ("Him?"), identifying the slumped youth as Matthew before his awakening. However, the consensus remains that the bearded man is the apostle.

== Identity of Christ ==
Some scholars speculate that Jesus is portrayed as the Last Adam or Second Adam as titled in the New Testament. This is displayed in Christ's hand as it reaches out towards Matthew. It is almost a mirrored image of Adam's hand in The Creation of Adam by Michelangelo, the namesake of Caravaggio. Twice in the New Testament, an explicit comparison is made between Jesus and Adam. In Romans 5:12–21, Paul argues that "just as through the disobedience of the one man the many were made sinners, so also through the obedience of the one man the many will be made righteous" (Romans 5:19, NIV). In 1 Corinthians 15:22, Paul argues that "as in Adam all die, so in Christ, all will be made alive," while in verse 45 he calls Jesus the "last/ultimate/final Adam".

== Style ==
"This clear legibility, so different from many Mannerist paintings, ... accounted for the work's enormous popularity." The position of Christ's hand, however, reflects that of Adam's in the Sistine Chapel; the Church considered Christ to be the Second Adam. But instead of being gifted life, as the first Adam was, Christ is instead the one who bestows it, calling Levi to a new life as Matthew.

Created during the Baroque era, the painting is an iconic example of the style, featuring conventions like naturalism and tenebrism, or a stark contrast between light and dark.

== Responses ==
Pope Francis has said that he often went to San Luigi as a young man to contemplate the painting. Referring both to Christ's outstretched arm and Matthew's response, Francis said, "This is me, a sinner on whom the Lord has turned his gaze."

== Other paintings of the same topic ==
There are many other early modern representations of the calling of Matthew. Two were painted prior to Caravaggio's but it is unlikely that Caravaggio would have encountered them.

- Vittore Carpaccio's version in the Accademia in Venice
- Marinus van Reymerswaele's version (1536)
- Giovanni Lanfranco's derivative version (1626–28)
- Spanish painter Juan de Pareja's version (1661) found in the Prado Museum in Madrid.
- Hendrick ter Brugghen
- Bernardo Strozzi's version (1620) in the Art Museum in Worcester, Massachusetts

== See also ==
- List of paintings by Caravaggio
