= Alberto di Jorio =

Roman Catholic Cardinal

His Eminence Alberto di Jorio
- Pro-President Emeritus of the Pontifical Commission for the Vatican City State
- Church: Roman Catholic Church
- Appointed: 14 August 1961
- Term ended: 4 November 1968
- Successor: Sergio Guerri
- Other post: Cardinal-Priest of Santa Pudenziana (1967–1979)
- Previous posts: Secretary General of the Administrative Office of the Institute for Works of Religion (1942–1944); Secretary of the College of Cardinals (1947–1958); Cardinal-Deacon of Santa Pudenziana pro illa vice (1958–1967); Titular Archbishop of Castra Nova (1962)

Orders
- Ordination: 18 April 1908
- Consecration: 19 April 1962 by Pope John XXIII
- Created cardinal: 15 December 1958 by Pope John XXIII
- Rank: Cardinal-Deacon (1958–1967); Cardinal-Bishop (1967–1979)

Personal details
- Born: Alberto di Jorio; 18 July 1884 Rome, Kingdom of Italy
- Died: 5 September 1979 (aged 95) Rome, Italy
- Buried: Santa Pudenziana
- Education: Pontifical Roman Seminary
- Motto: Innova
- Coat of arms: Alberto di Jorio's coat of arms

Styles of Alberto di Jorio
- Reference style: His Eminence
- Spoken style: Your Eminence
- Informal style: Cardinal

Alberto di Jorio (18 July 1884 – 5 September 1979) was a cardinal of the Catholic Church and for many years along with the layman Bernardino Nogara the powerhouse behind the growing wealth of the Vatican and the Istituto per le Opere di Religione (popularly known as the "Vatican Bank").

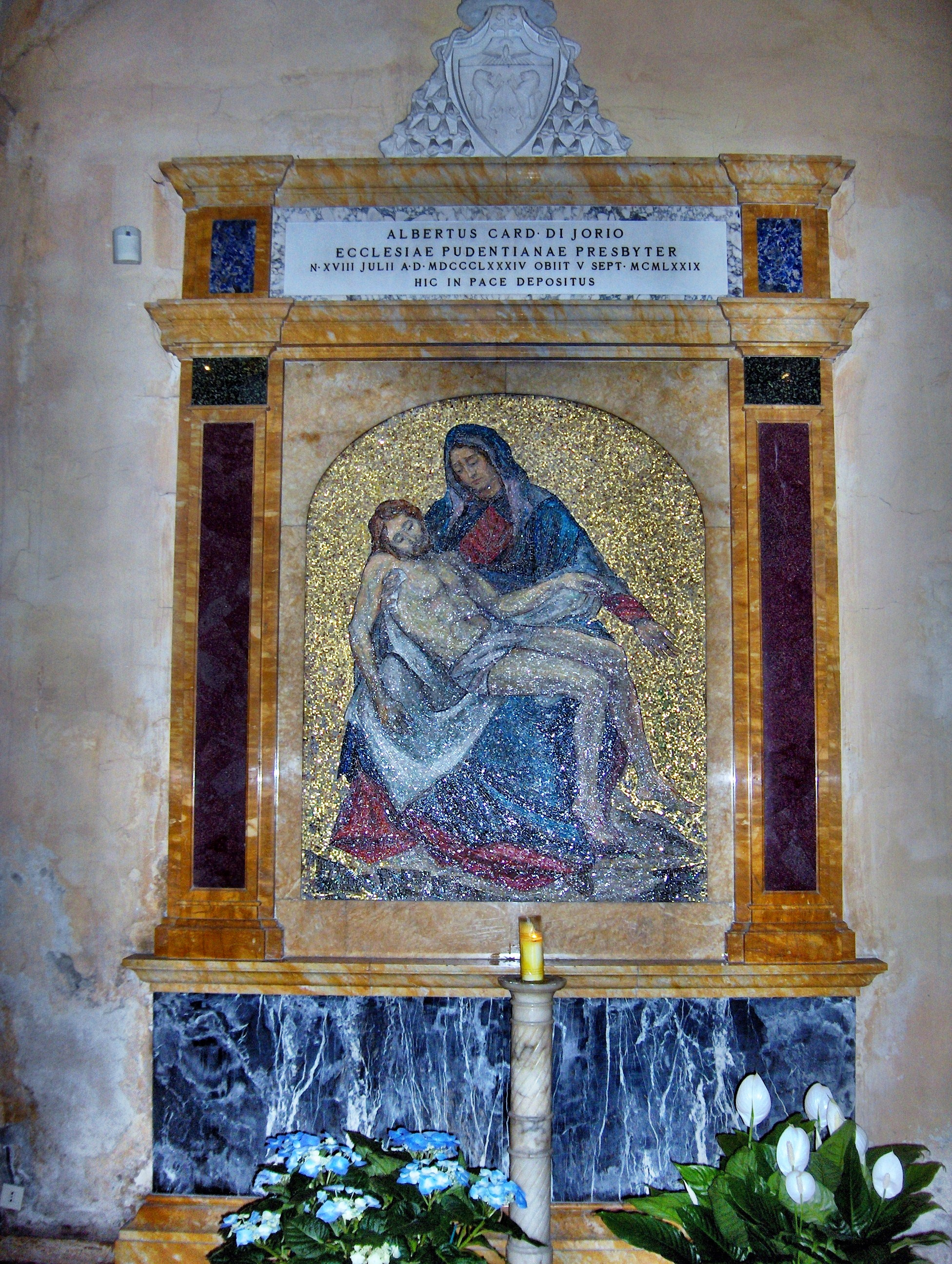
Tomb of Cardinal di Jorio in Santa Pudenziana, Rome

== Early life ==
Alberto di Jorio was born in Rome on 18 July 1884. From his earliest years di Jorio was destined for a career in the Roman Curia. He entered the most prestigious of Roman seminaries, the Pontifical Roman Seminary, and after becoming a priest in 1908 soon took up a role as an official in the vicariate of Rome. Despite doing some work as a pastor in Rome, di Jorio was always chiefly concerned with his work in the Vatican bureaucracy, and in 1918 he took up a role as president of the Istituto per le Opere di Religione ("Institute for Works of Religion").

Under the direction of Pope Pius XI, who was eager to settle the "Roman Question" that had kept the Pope as a "prisoner of the Vatican" since Italian unification in 1870, di Jorio formed a close association with Bernardino Nogara in the 1920s. After the Lateran Treaty settled the "Roman Question" and made the Vatican an independent state, di Jorio was chosen by Nogara to run the Vatican Bank, and aided by laws that allowed Nogara to freely buy shares in any company even if its business activities did not align with Catholic Church teaching, the Vatican grew immensely wealthy, buying extensively into such wealthy corporations as General Motors, Standard Oil, General Electric and IBM – as well as Italgas, the major supplier of gas in Italy at the time.

== Episcopal career ==
Di Jorio continued to run the Istituto per le Opere di Religione until after Vatican II, but he also played many other roles in the Curia during these years. He became Secretary of the College of Cardinals in 1947 and in that role was secretary of the 1958 conclave that elected Pope John XXIII. Immediately following his election, Pope John put his cardinal's red zucchetto on di Jorio's head, a traditional promise that he would make di Jorio a cardinal. Six weeks after the conclave, on 15 December 1958, di Jorio was elevated to Cardinal-Deacon of S. Pudenziana. After Pope John decided that all cardinals should be bishops, di Jorio was consecrated titular archbishop of Castra Nova on 19 April 1962 in St. John Lateran by Pope John, along with 11 other cardinal deacons. He opted for the order of cardinal priests on 26 June 1967.

Di Jorio participated in the Second Vatican Council and in the conclave of 1963 that elected Pope Paul VI. He continued to lead the Vatican Bank until 1968. On 4 November 1968, Pope Paul accepted di Jorio's resignation–which he had submitted several times in recent years–as pro-president of the Pontifical Commission for the Vatican City State.

He was one of the cardinals immediately affected when, in 1970, Pope Paul determined that only cardinals who had not reached 80 years of age would be allowed to participate in the election of a pope. Upon the death of José da Costa Nunes on 29 November 1976, di Jorio became the oldest member of the College of Cardinals. Pope Paul VI preached the homily at a Mass celebrating the seventieth anniversary of di Jorio's priestly ordination.

He died at home in Rome on 5 September 1979, at age 95.

Records
Preceded by José da Costa	Oldest living Member of the College of Cardinals; 29 November 1976 – 5 September 1979	Succeeded by Antonio Caggiano
