= Sergio Guerri =

Italian Cardinal (1905–1992)

His Eminence Sergio Guerri
- Pro-President Emeritus of the Pontifical Commission for the Vatican City State
- Church: Roman Catholic Church
- Appointed: 6 November 1968
- Term ended: 26 September 1981
- Predecessor: Alberto di Jorio
- Successor: Paul Casimir Marcinkus
- Other post: Cardinal-Priest of Santissimo Nome di Maria al Foro Traiano (1979–92)
- Previous posts: Pro-Secretary of the Administration of the Patrimony of the Apostolic See (1948–51); Secretary of the Administration of the Patrimony of the Apostolic See (1951–69); Vice-President of the Pontifical Commission for the Vatican City State (1968); Titular Archbishop of Trevi (1969); Cardinal-Deacon of Santissimo Nome di Maria al Foro Traiano (1969–79)

Orders
- Ordination: 30 March 1929 by Basilio Pompili
- Consecration: 27 April 1969 by Amleto Giovanni Cicognani
- Created cardinal: 30 April 1969 by Pope Paul VI
- Rank: Cardinal-Deacon (1969–79); Cardinal-Priest (1979–92)

Personal details
- Born: Sergio Guerri; 25 December 1905 Tarquinia, Kingdom of Italy
- Died: 15 March 1992 (aged 86) Vatican City
- Education: Pontifical Roman Athenaeum S. Apollinare
- Motto: Fides et labor
- Coat of arms

Styles of Sergio Guerri
- Reference style: His Eminence
- Spoken style: Your Eminence
- Informal style: Cardinal
- See: none

Sergio Guerri (25 December 1905 – 15 March 1992) was an Italian Cardinal of the Roman Catholic Church who served as personal theologian to five popes from 1955 to 1989, and was elevated to the cardinalate in 1969.

== Biography ==
Guerri was born in Tarquinia, and studied at the inter-diocesan Seminary of Montefiascone, Seminary of Viterbo, Pontifical Roman Seminary, Pontifical Lateran University, and the Pontifical Roman Athenaeum S. Apollinare. Ordained to the priesthood on 30 March 1929, he finished his studies in 1931, when he began pastoral work in Tarquinia. Guerri then served as Administrator of the Pontifical Urbaniana University from 1937 to 1941. He was raised to the rank of a Privy Chamberlain of His Holiness on 11 April 1940, and later a Domestic Prelate of His Holiness 19 June 1949.

He was also an official (1941–1946) and substitute secretary (1946–1948) of the Institute for Works of Religion in the Roman Curia. On 9 March 1948, Guerri was named Pro-Secretary of the Administration of the Patrimony of the Holy See, becoming its full Secretary on 1 January 1951.

He was later made a canon of St. Peter's Basilica on 25 April 1952. Named Secretary of the Central Preparatory Commission on 22 June 1960, Guerri was administrative secretary of the Second Vatican Council from 1960 to 1965. He was made Secretary of the Administration of the Patrimony of Holy See (7 May 1968) before becoming Pro-President of the Pontifical Commission for Vatican City State on 6 November 1968. A close friend of Paolo Bertoli and Umberto Mozzoni, he remained in this post until he was succeeded in 1969 by Giuseppe Caprio.

On 11 April 1969, in advance of his cardinalatial promotion, Guerri was appointed Titular Archbishop of Trebia. He received his episcopal consecration on the following 27 April from Cardinal Amleto Giovanni Cicognani, with Bishops Joseph Mark McShea and Plinio Pascoli, serving as co-consecrators, in the chapel of the Lateran Seminary. Shortly afterwards, Pope Paul VI created him Cardinal-Deacon of SS. Nome di Maria al Foro Troiano in the consistory of 28 April 1969.

Cardinal Guerri was one of the cardinal electors who participated in the conclaves of August and October 1978, which selected Popes John Paul I and John Paul II respectively. After ten-years' standing as a Cardinal Deacon, he opted to become a Cardinal Priest, with the same titular church, on 30 June 1979. He resigned as Pro-President of Vatican City State on 26 September 1981, following almost fourteen years of service.

Cardinal Guerri died in Vatican City, at age 86. He is buried in his family's chapel at the cemetery of Tarquinia.

Catholic Church titles
Preceded by Giulio Guidetti	Secretary of the Administration of the Patrimony of the Holy See; 1951–1969	Succeeded by Giuseppe Caprio
Preceded by Alberto di Jorio	Pro-President of the Pontifical Commission for Vatican City State; 1969–1981	Succeeded by Paul Marcinkus
