= Bernardino Nogara =

Italian financial advisor (born 1870)

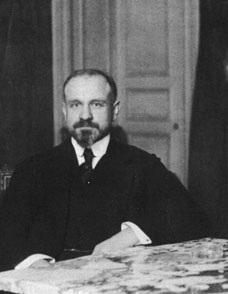
Bernardino Nogara c. 1912

Bernardino Nogara (June 17, 1870 — November 15, 1958) was the financial advisor to the Vatican between 1929 and 1954, appointed by Pope Pius XI and retained by Pope Pius XII as the first Director of the Special Administration of the Holy See. According to historian John F. Pollard, Nogara laid "the foundations" for "one of the biggest pillars for the Vatican's post-Second World War financial strength."

Nogara's career was characterized by an "ability to move fluidly in the highest circles of industry and politics as well as the Church". In his role as Director of the Special Administration, Nogara made large investments in many of the largest companies in Europe, personally becoming a board member of a "mind-boggling" number of firms, and appointing directors to many others.

Though a Catholic with several close relatives in the Holy Orders, Nogara insisted that his investments remain unrestricted by religious or doctrinal considerations. Under Pius XI, Nogara made large investments in firms contrary to Catholic social teaching and made direct loans to Mussolini's government prior to Mussolini's 1935 invasion of Ethiopia. Under Pius XII, Nogara routinely invested in firms that profited from and enabled the war effort of the Axis powers during World War II. Though these investments were hidden from the Allies (with whom Nogara also transacted), through the use of holding companies and offshore banking centres, under Nogara "like water finding a downhill path, Vatican money found its way to the grisly side of the Holocaust". However, other than a Vatican purchase in May 1940 of a minor shareholding in an Italian insurance company, La Fondaria, no primary source evidence has ever been offered in support of these latter claims, while documents recently discovered in The National Archives, London (in the T231 and T160 series) reveal that Nogara transferred the Vatican's entire foreign investment portfolio to the United States at the beginning of the war, and throughout the duration of the war was actively accumulating a substantial portfolio of stocks in British and American war-related industries in support of the Allied war effort. By contrast, no document has yet been produced to substantiate the claim that any funds were invested in Germany.

== Early financial career ==
Nogara was trained as an engineer at the Politecnico di Milano. He managed mining projects in Wales (where he learned fluent English), Bulgaria, and the Ottoman Empire. While in Istanbul, he was appointed a representative to the Italian Banca Commerciale and then the Italian representative to an international committee overseeing the Ottoman Empire's debt and the Italian delegation to the economic committee at the Versailles Peace Conference in 1919, after which he remained on the permanent reparations committee. He was later appointed to manage the industry section of the Inter-Allied Commission that enacted the Dawes Plan in Berlin.

Within the Banca Commerciale Italiana, Italy's largest private bank, he became a member of the board of directors and later the vice-president. He was also a member of the board of Commissioni Economiche e Finanziarie alle Conferenze (Comofin).

Nogara's dealings with the Vatican began in 1914, when he purchased a variety of bonds on behalf of Pope Benedict XV.

== Director of the Special Administration ==
=== Appointment ===
The Vatican finances were on the verge of bankruptcy prior to being bolstered by $92.1 million (750 million lire cash and another 1 billion lire in Italian government bonds) which the Vatican received as a consequence of the Lateran treaties in 1929, as compensation for the occupation and annexation of the Papal States by the Italian Government in 1861 and 1870.

In 1929, Pope Pius XI, a family friend, appointed Nogara director of the Special Administration of the Holy See, charged with the financial dealings of the Vatican. In theory, the director of the Special Administration reported to a three cardinal committee—which included Eugenio Pacelli (who became the next pope) and Pietro Gasparri; in practice, Nogara reported directly to the Pope, meeting with him more frequently than any official in the Curia, with the exception of the Cardinal Secretary of State. The Special Administration was independent of the other two Vatican financial offices, although Nogara may have exercised considerable influence over the other branches of Vatican finances as well.

Nogara accepted Pius XI's appointment on one condition: that he would not "be restricted by religious or doctrinal considerations". Nogara's promotion was just one of many where Pius XI favoured other natives of Lombardy with promotions within the Roman Curia. At the time, one of his brothers, Bartolomeo, was the superintendent of the Vatican museums, two were archbishops, one was the rector of an Apulian seminary, and his sister was a mother superior.

=== Under Pius XI ===
Nogara's tenure at the Special Administration came on the heels of the Wall Street crash of 1929, and its many after-effects in Europe. Nogara immediately restructured the holdings of the Holy See, moving approximately 100 million lire in gold reserves and moving aggressively into real estate as an entrepreneur rather than an arms-length investor. Nogara created many companies, and appointed equally many chief executive officers to firms that still exist today. Grolux, the holding company for the profits of the Special Administration between 1932 and 1935, was housed in Luxembourg due to its dearth of public disclosure laws.

Nogara became a board member of many Italian firms due to the Vatican's controlling interests, including Assicurazioni Generali, Italy's largest insurer (and one of the largest in the world), and Società Generale Immobiliare, the largest construction company in Italy (which went on to become one of the largest in the world). The Mafia's interest in these activities is fictionalized in the 1990 movie The Godfather Part III.

Nogara was a party to the negotiations on the reorganization of Italy's banks, which followed 1929 legislation bailing out the banks. With this inside information, Nogara knew exactly which industries and firms would benefit from the bailout and purchased large positions in these companies.

Nogara's seat on the boards ensured that he could direct the firm toward the interests of the Vatican and the other equity holders. Nogara, through shrewd investing in stocks, gold, and futures markets, vastly increased the Roman Catholic Church's financial holdings. By 1935, Nogara had vastly expanded the Vatican treasury in a sum estimated in the hundreds of millions of dollars (the Holy See kept the exact amount confidential).

Nogara was a controversial figure with the Roman Curia because many of his investments were perceived to violate the church's doctrines. For example, Nogara purchased a controlling share in Istituto Farmacologico Serono di Roma, Italy's largest manufacturer of birth control products. Nogara also invested in Italy's munitions plants and other war industries, including direct loans to Mussolini's government prior to his invasion of Ethiopia in 1935. However, Nogara was highly regarded by many cardinals for bolstering the church's finances, which had been declining since 1870.

=== Under Pius XII ===
After his election in 1939, Pope Pius XII retained Nogara as the head of the Special Administration. Pius XII met regularly with Nogara, as had his predecessor, keeping a close eye on the investment holding of the Holy See. Pius XII managed Nogara directly, with no intermediaries, and no notes were taken during their conferences (nor do any documents relating to Nogara exist in the ADSS). The information from this period of Nogara's tenure is relatively "scanty" (compared to the period 1931–1939, documented by Nogara himself), although much is contained in the US national archives due to Nogara's transactions with New York banks. However, a new and vast set of documents became available in 2012 when the day to day records of the Vatican's financial transactions for this period were discovered in The National Archives, London, (files T231/140 to T231/142, T231/1131 and T160/369) which throw new and interesting light on the Vatican's financial dealings throughout the duration of the war.

The immediate concern for Nogara upon the outbreak of World War II was that the Vatican assets in the various Allied and Axis countries not be seized or frozen. Nogara's "cloaked real estate companies" continued to operate throughout Europe, in Allied and Axis controlled territory, for the entire war. Although Germany otherwise had a policy of blocking funds that might reach Allied countries, the Vatican—which had, and used, an account at the Reichsbank—was excluded and enjoyed relative freedom. Reference does not support statement.

Nogara arranged the Vatican purchase of Profima, a Swiss property owner, into a full-fledged holding company, by 1938 "being able to participate in all forms of commercial, industrial, property and financial enterprises". It was through Profima, and other similarly organized holding companies, that the Vatican was able to purchase blacklisted companies, such as Banco Sudameris (blacklisted by both the US and Great Britain for its financing of the Axis war effort). There are reasons other than profit why Nogara may have been interested in Sudameris—for example, he helped found the bank prior to World War I—but it was without question that the purchase could only have produced a large return if Axis won the war.

Although Harold Tittmann, the American envoy, bypassed Nogara and warned the Cardinal Secretary of State against the purchase of Sudameris, once the Vatican went ahead with the purchase in 1941 it "left no stone unturned" in its quest to get the company removed from the Allied blacklists, petitioning nearly every relevant government in the world. According to Phayer, the confrontation over the delisting of Sudameris "boiled down to two views of fascism. For the Vatican, which had done business with the fascists during the prewar days, Sudameris was "business as usual".

Similarly, Nogara bought shares in Italian insurer La Fondiaria for the Vatican in May 1940, acting on a tip that Mussolini's government would soon nationalize many Italian assets of English insurer Norwich Union and hand them over to Fondiaria. Even at the time the purchase was controversial because only two months earlier the insurer had made clear its fascist sympathies by firing all of its Jewish employees. While the Allies would not have required the Vatican to sell its assets in Fondiaria if they had been acquired before the war, had they learned of this mid-war transaction, they would have blocked all the banking accounts of the Holy See in New York as well as its business interests in the United States and Great Britain. According to Phayer, both Nogara and Pius XII were well aware that their covert purchase of Fondiara amounted to a "betrayal of trust" of their agreements with the Allied powers. However, Italy did not declare war on Britain and France until June 1940, the US Freezing Orders were not applied to Italy and Continental Europe until July 1941 and the United States did not enter the war until after Pearl Harbor in December 1941, thus it is not clear in what sense this purchase in May 1940 involved the "betrayal of trust" asserted by Phayer.

Fondiaria would go on to collaborate with the Nazi expropriation of Eastern European insurance companies, both directly and indirectly (by working with collaborating re-insurers to pool risk). According to Phayer, "like water finding a downhill path, Vatican money found its way to the grisly side of the Holocaust". Phayer cites Nogara's timely purchases of firms about to benefit from fascist and Nazi expropriation as proof that Nogara "knew which way the wind was blowing". Another firm that Nogara invested the Vatican heavily in, Assicurazioni Generali, was the prime beneficiary of the fact that "fascist countries were about to remake the European insurance industry" at the expense of the European Jewry.

In 1941, Phayer suggests that Nogara may have been planning a substantial investment in Iberian tungsten carbonate mining operations (the "high tech metal of the conflict"), the same year that Germany's invasion of Russia cut off their previous supply of Russian metals. According to Phayer, "the conclusion is unavoidable: Nogara indirectly trafficked in the arms race and did so knowing that any resulting profit would be derived from stolen property". As the US would have blocked the transaction had they known it was for tungsten mining, the Vatican labelled the funds as earmarked for "food exports". But Phayer's contention is convincingly undermined by British Foreign Office file FO371/28930 which reveals that the pesetas and escudos supplied by the US Government for food exports were in fact used by Carlo Pacelli, Pius XII's nephew, to purchase food from Spain and Portugal with which the Vatican was feeding half the starving population of Rome. Thus no evidence whatsoever exists to support Phayer's speculation.

Based on a reference to one "Noraga", an Abwehr agent, in the interrogation report of Abwehr recruiter Karl Wilhelm Reme, Gerald Posner argues that this could only be Bernardino Nogara who would thereby be able "to sabotage the Allied war effort and at the same time find ways to help finance the Axis powers". However, John Pollard, reviewing Posner's book in The Tablet, points out that the interrogation report of this selfsame Nogara is found in The National Archives, London, where he is identified as Bruno Nogara, a Venice school teacher and Blackshirt fanatic who was arrested by the Allies in April 1945.

Faced with this evidence, Posner has amended his recently published paperback version of God’s Bankers and now says, on page 137, that there were in fact two Abwehr agents named Nogara: Bruno Nogara, whose Interrogation Report is found in The National Archives, London, and Branch Nogara, listed in Appendix C of the Interrogation Report of Reinhard Reme, Abwehr II Recruiter, found in the National Archives and Records Administration, Washington, D.C. His argument is that the former, Bruno Nogara, is listed as a member of Abwehr Unit 257 under Reichsstatthalter Hubert Pfannenstiel, while the latter, Branch Nogara, is listed under Abwehr Unit 254 commanded by Reichsstatthalter Ernst Schmidt-Burck – thus, two different Abwehr Units under two different commanders and therefore two different Nogaras. “The Tablet”, however, reports that the very source cited by Posner clearly identifies "Branch Nogara", not as a person, but as the small town of Nogara located just north of the river PO where Abwehr Unit 254 maintained its supply depot. According to The Tablet, there is no second Nogara, only Bruno Nogara, an Abwehr agent, and the small Italian town of Nogara which Posner claims refers to Bernardino Nogara, the Vatican's Financial Director, when actually it refers a town of the same name.

According to Pollard, it became public in Nogara's obituary in 1958 that in WWII, Nogara was the Vatican's representative in Rome's underground resistance movement, the Committee of National Liberation. Nogara's grandson, Ambassador Osio, in his interviews with Pollard, said that Nogara did not invest in German securities, or in tungsten, and that he disliked the Nazis.

In 1954, Nogara was succeeded as director of the Special Administration of the Holy See by Henri de Maillardoz, a director of Credit Suisse.

== Diary ==
Nogara kept a diary recording his audiences with Pius XI from 1931 to 1939, which remains unpublished. The diary is supplemented by a variety of papers in the Nogara Archives (AFN), which provide detailed information about the finances of the Vatican and Nogara's involvement.
