= Santi Claudio e Andrea dei Borgognoni =

Church of SS. Claudius and Andrew of the Burgundians
- Saints-Claude-et-André-des-Bourguignons(in French)
- Santi Claudio e Andrea dei Borgognoni (in Italian)
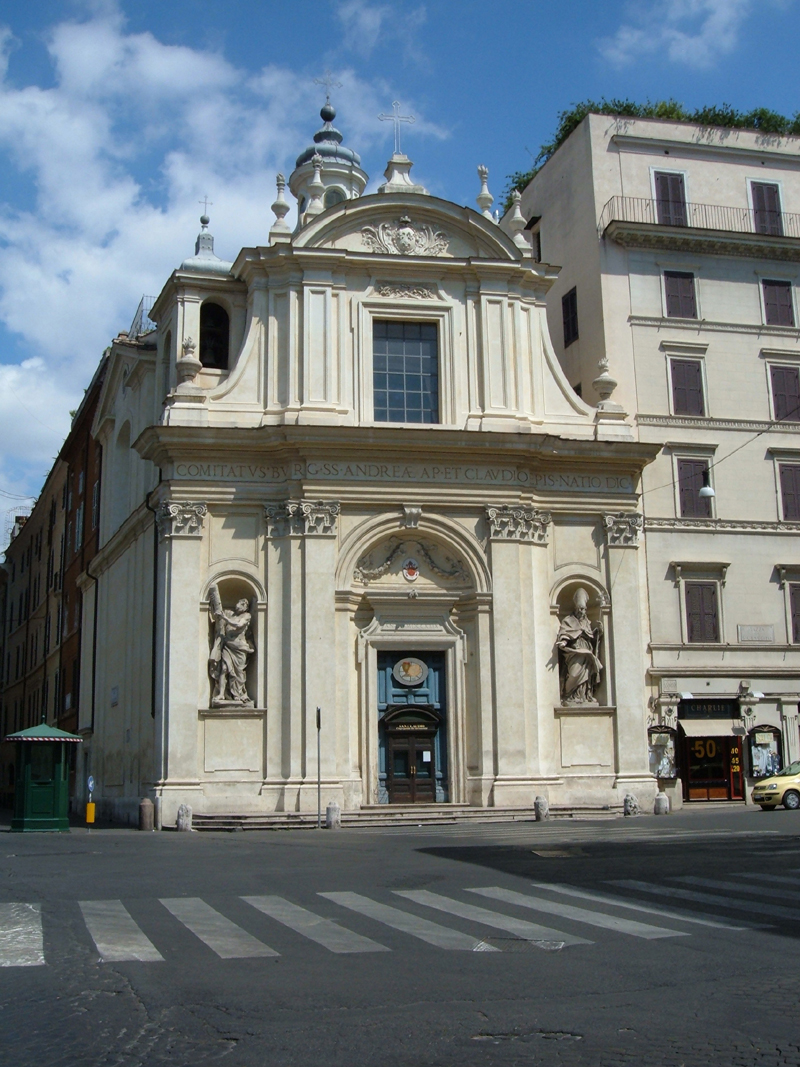
- Façade of Santi Claudio e Andrea dei Borgognoni, National Church in Rome of France (Burgundy).
- Click on the map for a fullscreen view
- 41°54′8.3″N 12°28′53.5″E
- Location: Via del Pozzetto 160, Trevi, Rome
- Country: Italy
- Denomination: Roman Catholic
- Tradition: Roman rite
- Website: Official website

History
- Status: national church
- Dedication: Claudius of Besançon and Andrew the Apostle
- Consecrated: 1731

Architecture
- Architect: Antoine Dérizet
- Architectural type: Church
- Style: Baroque
- Groundbreaking: 1728
- Completed: 1730

The Church of SS. Claudius and Andrew of the Burgundians (Italian: Santi Claudio e Andrea dei Borgognoni, French: Saints-Claude-et-André-des-Bourguignons) is a Roman Catholic church dedicated to Saint Claudius of Besançon and the apostle Saint Andrew. It is one of the national churches in Rome dedicated to France (Free County of Burgundy). Built from 1728 to 1730, the church was designed by French architect Antoine Dérizet.

== History ==
Burgundians, mostly bankers and merchants, were present in Rome since the 15th century. Following the Thirty Years' War (1618–1648) and the annexation by the Kingdom of France of the Free County of Burgundy (previously ruled by the Holy Roman Empire and today's Franche-Comté), the community grew up to twelve thousand people. In 1652 founded a national brotherhood and bought an oratory near the present Place of San Silvestro. In 1662, a hospice for pilgrims was opened near the church. Pope Innocent XI proclaimed the oratory national church of the Burgundians.

In 1726, the old church was demolished. In June 1728, construction of the new building designed by Antoine Dérizet began. The church was consecrated in 1731 and dedicated to Saint Claudius of Besançon and Saint Andrew the Apostle. Since 1866, the fathers of Congregation of the Blessed Sacrament officiate in the Church, holding the perpetual adoration of the Eucharist.

== Interior ==
The plan of the church is a Greek cross, with a hemispherical dome; pendentives are decorated with stuccoes of the Four Evangelists, while the four arches supporting the dome are decorated with stuccoes of angels and allegories of the Passion, Hope and Faith. Above the main altar, a fresco of Antonio Bicchi depicts the Lord blessing.

On the left side chapel is the polychrome marble urn, work of Corrado Mezzana, containing the relics of Peter Julian Eymard, founder of the Congregation of the Blessed Sacrament. The altar is decorated with a painting by Placido Costanzi which depicts a vision of St. Charles Borromeo (1731).

The side chapel on the right is dedicated to Saint Joseph and is decorated with modern works of Cleto Luzi (1949), "Dream of St. Joseph" and "the Flight into Egypt". On the altar stands a sculpture representing St. Joseph between two angels made by Guido Francisci.

== Exterior ==
The façade is decorated with two large statues of Saint Andrew by Luc Breton and Saint Claudius of Besançon by Guillaume Antoine Grandjacquet, made in 1771.

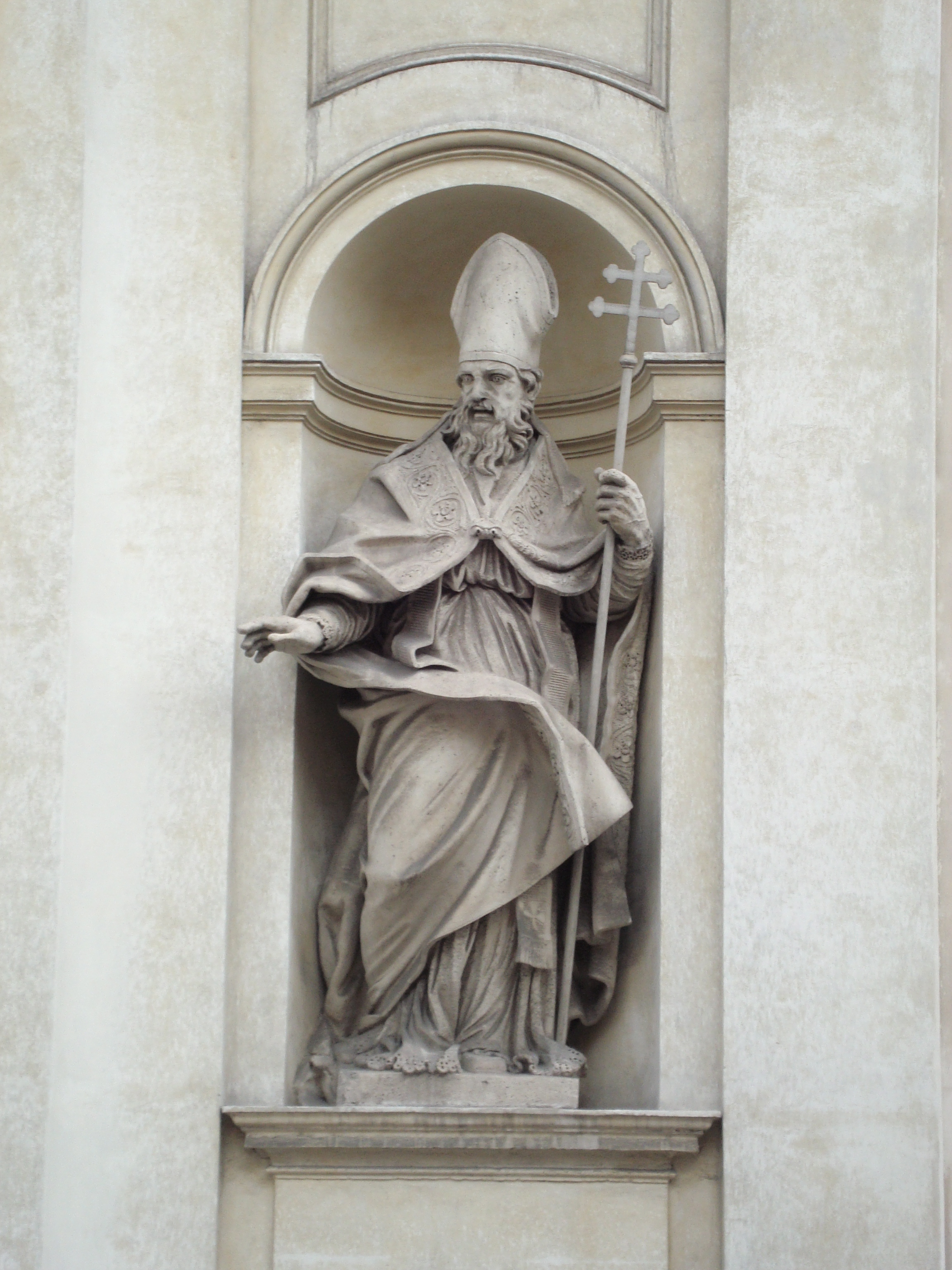
Statue of Saint Claudius of Besançon

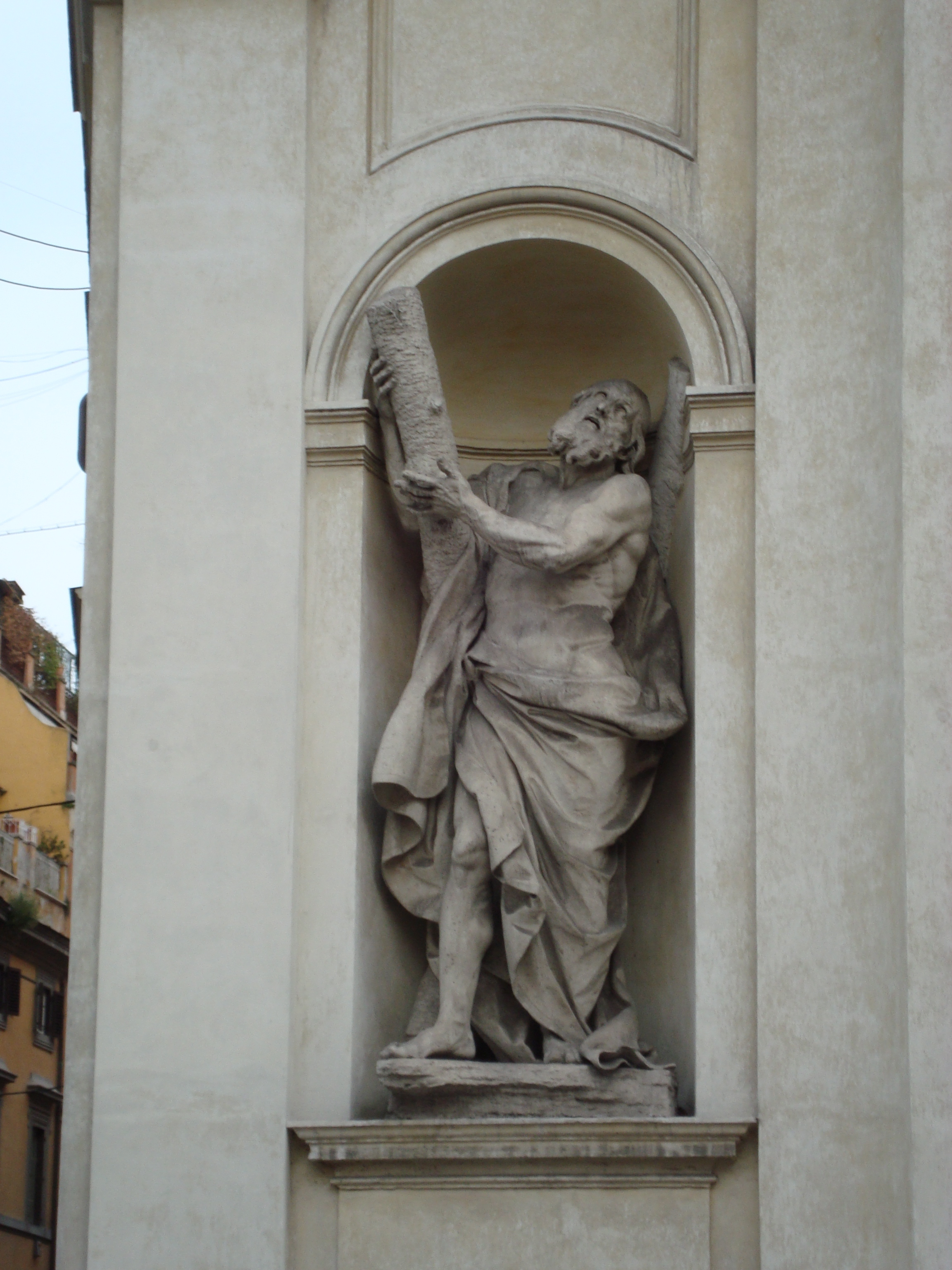
Statue of Saint Andrew

== See also ==
- San Silvestro in Capite
