= Antoine Derizet =

French architect

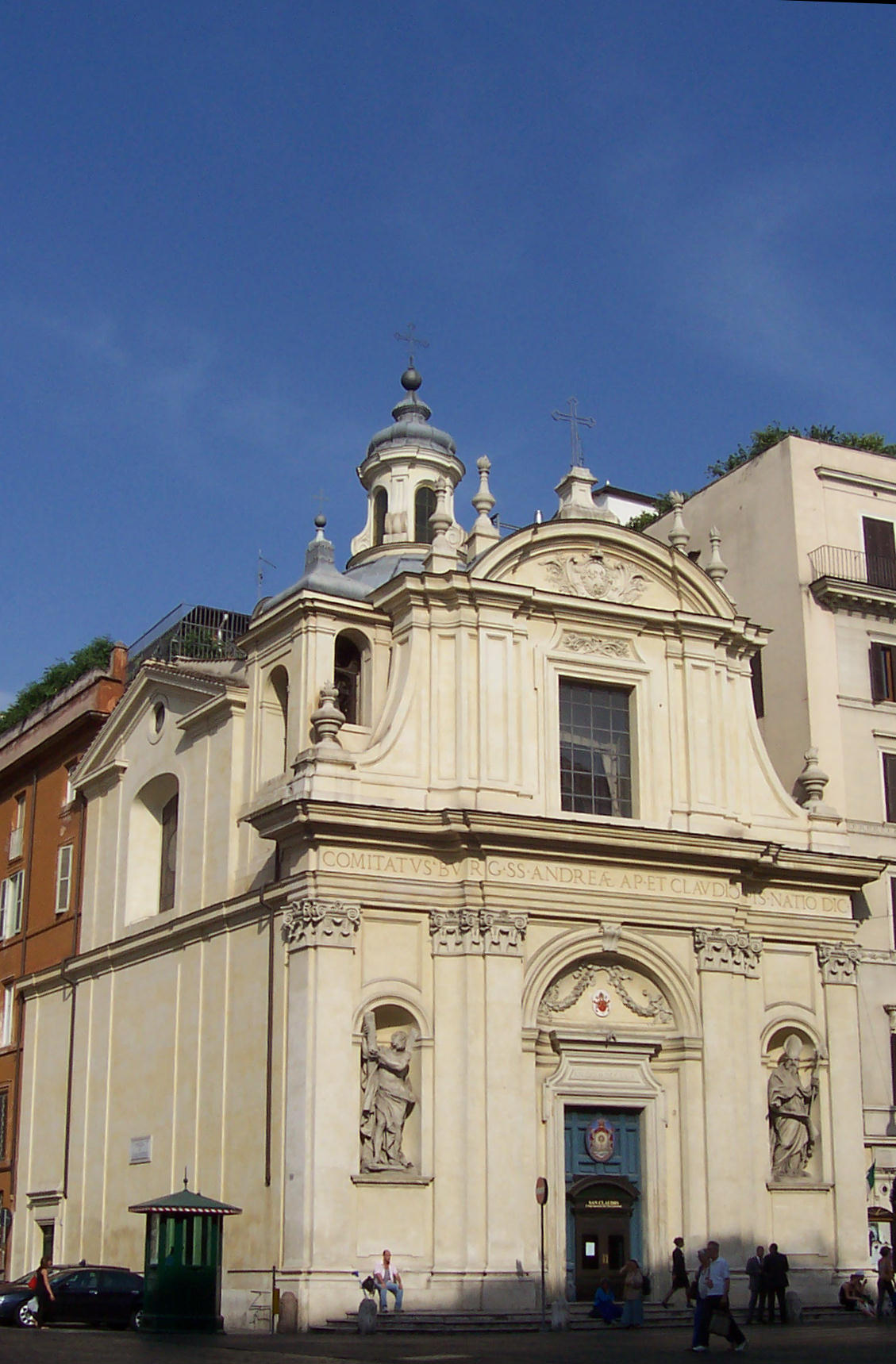
Dérizet 's Church of SS. Claudius and Andrew of the Burgundian, Rome

Antoine Dérizet (16 November 1685 – 6 October 1768), of Lyon, was an experimentally classicizing French Late Baroque architect who spent much of his career in Rome, where he designed the churches of Church of SS. Claudius and Andrew of the Burgundian (c.1729), where he experimented with reviving the High Renaissance central planning of a Greek cross surmounted by a central dome, and, facing Trajan's Forum, Santissimo Nome di Maria (1736–38), which is elliptical in plan, with radiating chapels. He also provided designs for the marble revetment and stuccoes added to the interior of San Luigi dei Francesi (1759–64).

Dérizet lectured at the Accademia di San Luca on his theory of proportional harmonies between music and architecture. These theories, akin to those common in the Renaissance but currently fallen into desuetude, failed to convince the architect Giacomo Quarenghi, who attended the lectures, according to his remarks in letters to the mathematician Alexander Barca in Padua. Quarenghi studied with Dérizet 'for about a year' just before the latter died of apoplexy. (Note: See the entry on Quarenghi in 'Vite de' pittori, scultori e archittetti Bergamaschi', Volume 2 by Francesco Maria Tassi online at Google Books.)

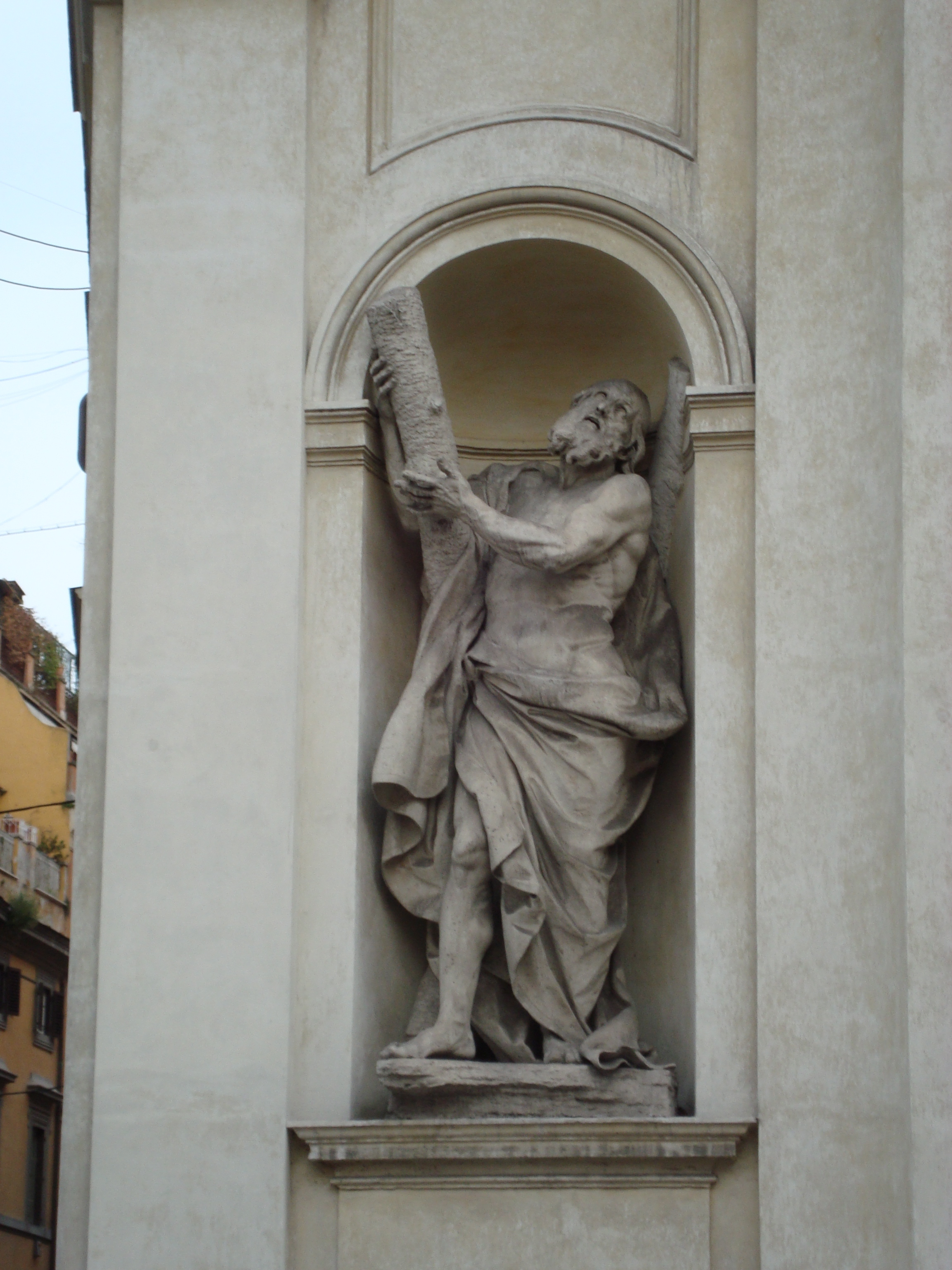
Saint Andrew in a niche

A close friend was the painter-collector Adrien Manglard (1695–1760), his compatriot at the Accademia.

There is a caricature of Dérizet by Pier Leone Ghezzi.
