= Most Holy Name of the Blessed Virgin Mary =

Catholic festivity

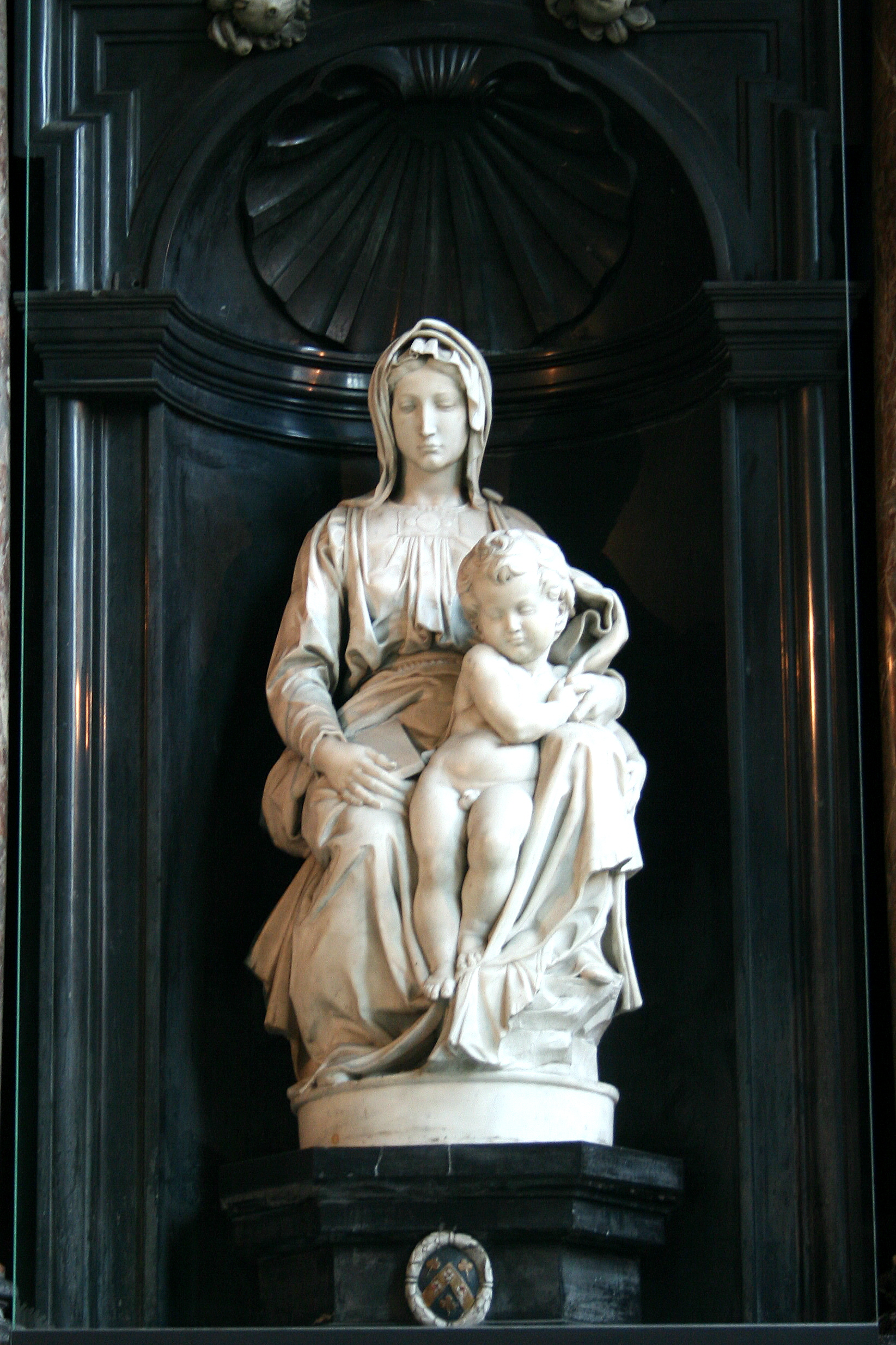
Virgin and Child in the Onze-Lieve-Vrouw church in Bruges by Michelangelo (early 16th century).

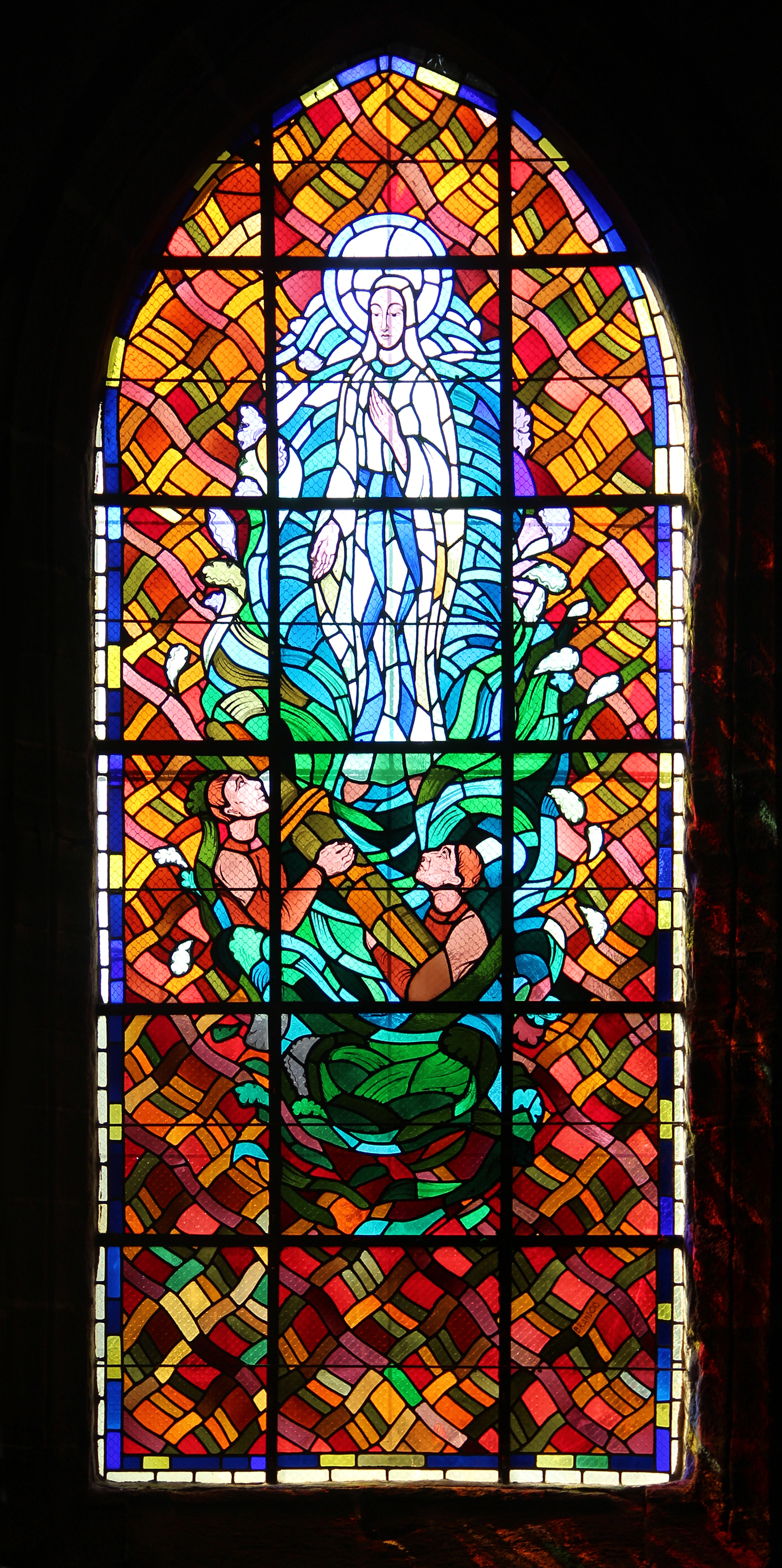
Stained glass window of the Virgin Mary - Notre-Dame Church of Larmor-Plage.

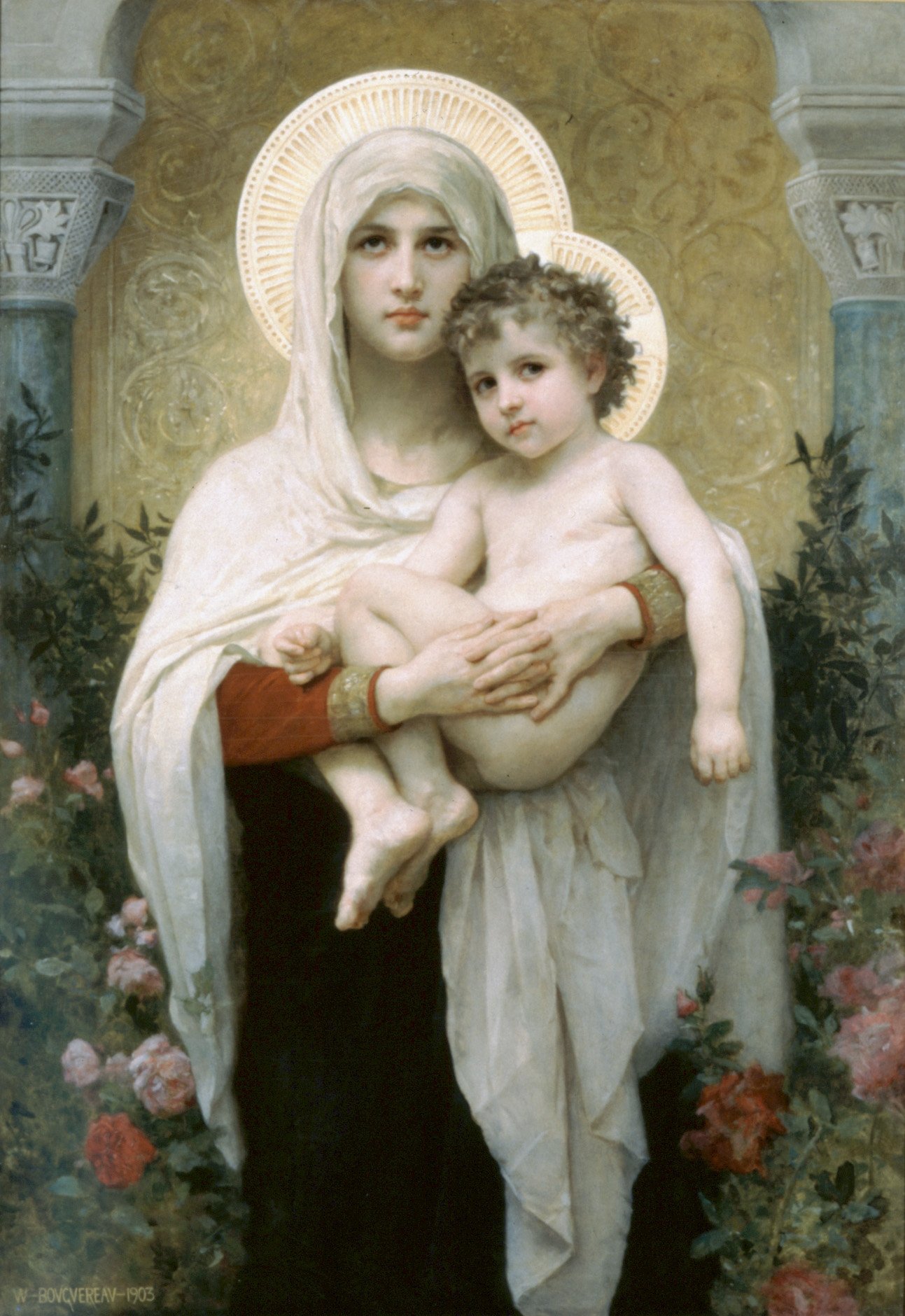
The Madonna of the Roses (1903) by William-Adolphe Bouguereau (1825-1905).

The Feast of the Most Holy Name of the Blessed Virgin Mary is an optional memorial celebrated in the liturgical calendar of the Catholic Church on 12 September. It has been a universal Roman Rite feast since 1684, when Pope Innocent XI included it in the General Roman Calendar to commemorate the victory at the Battle of Vienna in 1683. It was initially removed from the current Church calendar in the liturgical reform following Vatican II, but it was restored by Pope John Paul II in 2002 along with the Feast of the Holy Name of Jesus in January.

== Meaning of the name ==
In Hebrew, the name Mary is "Mīryam". In Aramaic, the language spoken in her own time, the form of the name was "Maryām". Based on the root "merur", the name signifies "bitterness". This is reflected in the words of Naomi, who, after losing a husband and two sons lamented, "Do not call me Naomi (‘Sweet’). Call me Mara (‘Bitter’), for the Almighty has made my life very bitter."

Meanings ascribed to Mary's name by the early Christian writers and perpetuated by the Greek Fathers include: "Bitter Sea," "Myrrh of the Sea", "The Enlightened One," "The Light Giver," and especially "Star of the Sea" (from Stella Maris, a scribal error of Stilla Maris, "Drop of the Sea"), Stella Maris was by far the favored interpretation. Jerome suggested the name meant "Lady", based on the Aramaic "mar" meaning "Lord". In the book, The Wondrous Childhood of the Most Holy Mother of God, St. John Eudes offers meditations on seventeen interpretations of the name "Mary," taken from the writings of "the Holy Fathers and by some celebrated Doctors". The name of Mary is venerated because it belongs to the Mother of God.

== Veneration ==
Mary's name occurs in the first and second parts of the Hail Mary.

At Rome, one of the twin churches at the Forum of Trajan is dedicated to the Name of Mary (Santissimo Nome di Maria al Foro Traiano).

Promoters of veneration of the Holy Name of Mary include Saints Anthony of Padua, Bernard of Clairvaux, and Alphonsus Maria de Liguori. A number of religious orders such as the Cistercians and the Servites, customarily give each member "Mary" as part of his/her religious name as a sign of honor and of entrustment to the Virgin.

=== Feast day ===
The feast is a counterpart to the Feast of the Holy Name of Jesus (January 3). Its object is to commemorate all the privileges bestowed upon Mary by God and all the graces received through her intercession and mediation.

The entry in the Roman Martyrology about the feast speaks of it in the following terms:

The Holy Name of the Blessed Virgin Mary, a day on which the inexpressible love of the Mother of God for her Holy Child is recalled, and the eyes of the faithful are directed to the figure of the Mother of the Redeemer, for them to invoke with devotion.

==== History ====
The feast day began in 1513 as a local celebration in Cuenca, Spain, celebrated on 15 September. In 1587 Pope Sixtus V moved the celebration to 17 September. Pope Gregory XV extended the celebration to the Archdiocese of Toledo in 1622. In 1666 the Discalced Carmelites received permission to recite the Divine Office of the Name of Mary four times a year. In 1671 the feast was extended to the whole Kingdom of Spain. From there, the feast spread, and soon extended to the Kingdom of Naples.

In 1683, the Polish king John Sobieski arrived at Vienna with his army. Before the Battle of Vienna, Sobieski placed his troops under the protection of the Blessed Virgin Mary. In the following year, to celebrate the victory, Pope Innocent XI added the feast to the Roman calendar, assigning to it the Sunday within the octave of the Nativity of Mary.

The reform of Pope Pius X in 1911 restored to prominence the celebration of Sundays in their own right, avoiding their being often replaced by celebrations from the sanctoral. The celebration of the Holy Name of Mary was therefore moved to 12 September. Later in the same century, the feast was removed from the General Roman Calendar in 1969 as part of its reform by Pope Paul VI, as something of a duplication of the 8 September feast of the Nativity of the Blessed Virgin Mary, but it did not cease to be a recognized celebration of the Roman Rite, being mentioned in the Roman Martyrology on 12 September. In 2002 Pope John Paul II restored the celebration to the General Roman Calendar.

== Legacy ==
Blessed William Joseph Chaminade chose the Feast of the Holy Name of Mary as the patronal feast of the Society of Mary (Marianists), rather than a day commemorating a particular dogma or devotion in order to focus on the person of Mary. For similar reasons, the similarly named but unrelated Society of Mary (Marists), was to adopt the same patronal feast.

A number of parishes and schools worldwide are dedicated to the Holy Name of Mary.

The Dulce Nombre de Maria Cathedral Basilica in Hagåtña, Guam, is the episcopal see of the Archbishop of Agaña.

== See also ==
- Ave Maris Stella
