= Madonna and Child with Saint Roch and Saint Sebastian =

Madonna and Child with Saint Roch and Saint Sebastian may refer to:

- Madonna and Child with Saint Roch and Saint Sebastian (Lotto)
- Madonna and Child with Saint Roch and Saint Sebastian (Moretto)
