= Pralboino Altarpiece =

C. 1540 painting by Moretto da Brescia

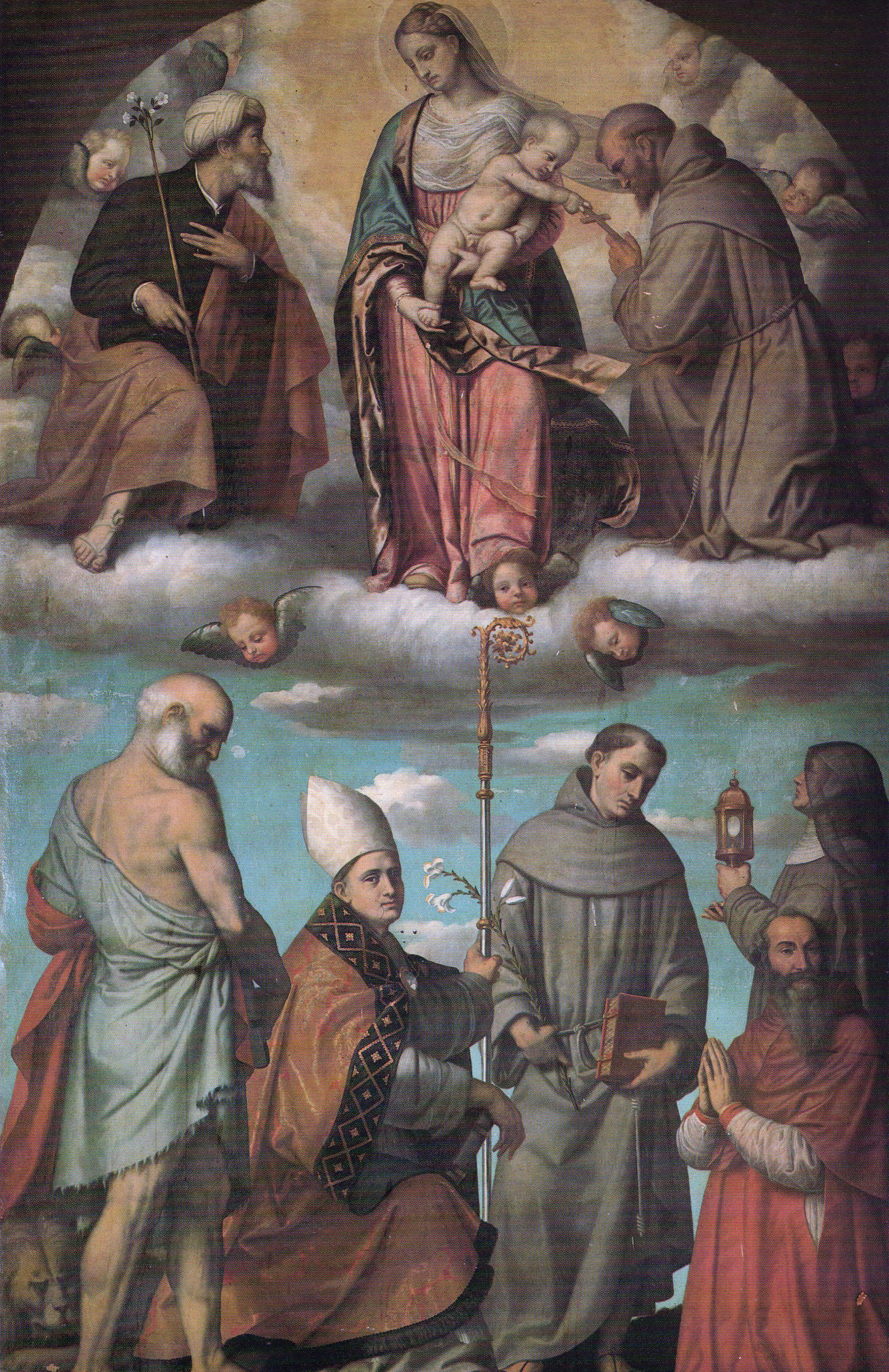
Pralboino Altarpeice (1540–1545) by Moretto da Brescia

The Pralboino Altarpiece is an oil on canvas altarpiece, of 1540–1545 and measuring 356 x 225 cm, by Moretto da Brescia in the church of Sant'Andrea in Pralboino, Province of Brescia, Italy. The work's upper register shows the Madonna and Child with Francis of Assisi and Saint Joseph, whilst below (from left to right) are saints Jerome, Louis of Toulouse, Anthony of Padua, Clare of Assisi and the painting's commissioner, cardinal Uberto Gambara, member of a local family. It was originally in the same town's Franciscan church of Santa Maria degli Angeli.

It was first recorded in the 17th century by Francesco Paglia, who described it after mentioning his Madonna and Child with Saint Roch and Saint Sebastian in the church of San Rocco, now in the parish church. It was probably moved to its present location after the first suppression of the Franciscans on 30 September 1797 - it was certainly there by 1858, when an engraving of the painting referred to it being in Sant'Andrea, as did Stefano Fenaroli's 1875 guidebook.

== Bibliography (in Italian) ==
- Pietro Da Ponte, L'opera del Moretto, Brescia 1898
- Stefano Fenaroli, Alessandro Bonvicino soprannominato il Moretto pittore bresciano. Memoria letta all'Ateneo di Brescia il giorno 27 luglio 1873, Brescia 1875
- György Gombosi, Moretto da Brescia, Basel 1943
- Mina Gregori, G. B. Moroni in I pittori bergamaschi dal XIII al XIX secolo - Il Cinquecento, Bergamo 1979
- Francesco Paglia, Il Giardino della Pittura, Brescia 1675
- Gaetano Panazza, Camillo Boselli, Pitture in Brescia dal Duecento all'Ottocento, exhibition catalogue, Brescia 1946
- Pier Virgilio Begni Redona, Alessandro Bonvicino – Il Moretto da Brescia, Editrice La Scuola, Brescia 1988
