= Vittorio Francesco Viola =

Italian catholic archbishop (born 1965)

His Excellency, The Most Reverend Vittorio Francesco Viola O.F.M.
- Archpriest of St Peter's Basilica, Vicar General for the Vatican City State
- Bishop Viola in 2018
- Church: Roman Catholic Church
- Appointed: 10 October 2026
- Predecessor: Mauro Gambetti
- Previous posts: Custos for the Basilica di Santa Maria degli Angeli (1999-2005); Custos for the Basilica di Santa Chiara (2005-14); Bishop of Tortona (2014-21); Secretary for the Congregation for Divine Worship and the Discipline of the Sacraments (2021-2026)

Orders
- Ordination: 3 July 1993 by Luca Brandolini
- Consecration: 7 December 2014 by Domenico Sorrentino

Personal details
- Born: Vittorio Francesco Viola; 4 October 1965 (age 61) Biella, Italy
- Education: Pontifical Institute of Sacred Liturgy
- Motto: In tuis te invenio sacramentis ("I discover You in Your sacraments")
- Coat of arms: Vittorio Francesco Viola's coat of arms

Vittorio Francesco Viola, O.F.M. (born 4 October 1965) is an Italian Catholic prelate who currently serves as the Archpriest of Saint Peter's Basilica and the Vicar General for the Vatican City State since 2026. He previously served as secretary of the Congregation for Divine Worship and the Discipline of the Sacraments from 2021 to 2026. A member of the Order of Friars Minor, he was Bishop of Tortona from 2014 to 2021.

Viola's education specialized in liturgy; he has taught sacred liturgy at several institutions, managed the liturgy office of the Ecclesiastical Region of Umbria for almost two decades, and served as a member of the Italian Bishops Conference's commission for liturgy.

== Early years ==
Vittorio Francesco Viola was born on 4 October 1965 in Biella. He concentrated on science in high school and enrolled in university planning to study medicine, but after participating in Franciscan programs for young people he entered the Order of Friars Minor. He studied at the Theological Institute of Assisi and the Pontifical Institute of Sacred Liturgy in Rome, where he obtained his licentiate in liturgy. At the same university in 2000 he obtained his doctorate in sacred liturgy. The school is well known for its commitment to the program of the Second Vatican Council and how it understands liturgy.

On 14 September 1991 he took his solemn vows in the Order of Friars Minor in Santa Maria degli Angeli. He was ordained as a deacon on 4 July 1992 and as a priest on 3 July 1993 by Luca Brandolini, Auxiliary Bishop of Rome.

After ordination, in the Order of Friars Minor he was definitor of the province of Umbria from 1999 to 2002, from 2003 to 2005, and from 2011 to 2014. He was Custodian of the Convent and the Papal Basilica of Santa Maria degli Angeli at the Porziuncola from 1999 to 2005 and Guardian of the Convent at the Basilica of Santa Chiara in Assisi from 2005 to 2014. At the diocesan level he was responsible for the liturgical office of the Ecclesiastical Region of Umbria from 1997 to 2014, for the education office of the Diocese of Assisi from 2006 to 2008 and then of the Caritas office of that diocese from 2008 to 2014. Because of his Caritas responsibilities, he helped organize and witnessed Pope Francis' lunch with the poor on his papal first visit to Assisi in October 2013, which Viola recalled was a surprising innovation at the time. He later told an interviewer that he developed his administrative skills at Caritas. In a message for Lent in 2014 he wrote: "When the data of the economic crisis, the percentages of unemployment, the options of immigration policies become names and faces, then we cannot fail to feel called to approach with the concrete service and with the charity of the proclamation of the Gospel because the preferential option for the poor must be translated above all into a favored and priority religious attention."

He has taught sacred liturgy at the Pontifical Institute of Sacred Liturgy, the Theological Institute of Assisi, and the Institute of Religious Sciences in Assisi.

== Bishop ==
On 15 October 2014, Pope Francis appointed him bishop of Tortona. On 7 December he received his episcopal ordination in the Basilica of Santa Maria degli Angeli in Assisi from Domenico Sorrentino, archbishop of Assisi with Cardinal Gualtiero Bassetti, Archbishop of Perugia, and Bishop Martino Canessa, his predecessor in Tortona, as co-consecrators. As his episcopal motto he chose a Latin phrase from Saint Ambrose: In tuis te invenio sacramentis ("I discover you in your sacraments"). On 14 December he took possession of the diocese. When made a bishop he was the youngest Italian ordinary.

He was a member of the national commission for the liturgy within the Italian Episcopal Conference. As bishop, Viola said he tried to deepen the connections between liturgy and daily life: "They are not different things. The encounter with Christ that is fulfilled in fullness in the celebration of the sacraments is the same encounter with Christ that you live by welcoming your poor brother. It is always the same face of Christ that you meet."

Viola is well known in Italian church circles for his enmity to the Traditional Latin Mass, and he is frequently linked to theologian Andrea Grillo, one of the principal intellectual architects behind the 2021 motu proprio Traditionis Custodes, with Grillo often described in liturgical circles as a key theological collaborator and close adviser to Viola. According to Edgar Beltrán, writing in The Pillar, both Viola and Grillo were deeply involved in the drafting and implementation of Traditionis custodes, issued under the pontificate of Pope Francis, which imposed draconian restrictions on the TLM, as well as authoring subsequent proposed restrictions which did not come to fruition.

== Curial service ==
Viola had a private audience with Pope Francis on 14 January 2021. On 27 May 2021, Pope Francis appointed him secretary of the Congregation for Divine Worship and the Discipline of the Sacraments, raising him to the rank of archbishop and giving him the title Archbishop-Bishop Emeritus of Tortona. He became apostolic administrator of Tortona.

On 10 October 2026, Pope Leo XIV appointed him as the Archpriest of Saint Peter's Basilica and Vicar General for the Vatican City State, replacing Cardinal Mauro Gambetti upon his appointment as the next Archbishop of Chieti-Vasto

== Honors ==
On 16 September 2017, Viola was made an honorary conventual chaplain of the Knights of Malta.

On 27 December 2017, he was made a commander of the Order of Merit of the Italian Republic.

== Works ==
- Presbiterato ed episcopato nel Sacramentarium Gelasianum Vetus (in Italian). Rome: Pontificium Athenaeum S. Anselmi de Urbe. 2000. (Note: Based on his doctoral thesis "Comple, Domine, in sacerdotibus tuis ministerii tui summam: presbiterato ed episcopato nel Sacramentarium Gelasianum Vetus. Per textuum euchologicorum philologiam, ad liturgicam theologiam", devoted to ordination prayer found in the Gelasian Sacramentary.)
- Rinnova in loro l'effusione del tuo spirito: la spiritualità dei presbiteri a partire dall'ordinazione (in Italian). Todi: TAU Editrice. 2010. ISBN 978-88-87472-76-9.

== Notes ==
Catholic Church titles
Preceded by Martino Canessa	Bishop of Tortona; 15 October 2024 – 27 May 2021	Succeeded by Guido Marini
Preceded by Mauro Gambetti	Archpriest for Saint Peter's Basilica; 10 October 2026 – present	Incumbent
Preceded by Mauro Gambetti	Vicar General for the Vatican State; 10 October 2026 – present	Incumbent
Preceded by Mauro Gambetti	President of the Fabric of Saint Peter; 10 October 2026 – present	Incumbent
