= Modesto Gavazzi =

Modesto Gavazzi may refer to:

- Modesto Gavazzi (archbishop of Chieti) (died 1657), Italian Roman Catholic archbishop
- Modesto Gavazzi (bishop of Alife) (died 1608), Italian Roman Catholic bishop
