= Mauro Gambetti =

Italian Catholic prelate (born 1965)

His Eminence Mauro Gambetti OFM Conv.
- Cardinal, Metropolitan Archbishop of Chieti-Vasto
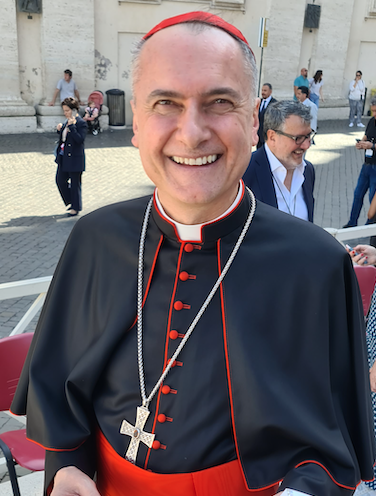
- Gambetti in 2024
- Church: Catholic
- Archdiocese: Chieti-Vasto
- Appointed: 3 October 2026
- Predecessor: Bruno Forte
- Other post: Cardinal-Deacon of Santissimo Nome di Maria al Foro Traiano (2020‍–‍present)
- Previous posts: General Custos of the Sacred Convent of Saint Francis (2013‍–‍2020); Titular Archbishop of Thisiduo (2020); Member, Pontifical Commission for Vatican City State (2022‍–‍2025); Archpriest of St Peter's Basilica (2021‍–‍2026); Vicar General of Vatican City State (2021‍–‍2026)

Orders
- Ordination: 8 January 2000
- Consecration: 22 November 2020 by Agostino Vallini
- Created cardinal: 28 November 2020 by Pope Francis
- Rank: Cardinal-Deacon

Personal details
- Born: Mauro Maria Gambetti; 27 October 1965 (age 60) Castel San Pietro Terme, Bologna, Italy
- Education: University of Bologna
- Motto: Omnibus subiecti in caritate (Latin for 'Be subject to all in charity')
- Coat of arms

Mauro Maria Gambetti OFM Conv. (born 27 October 1965) is an Italian Catholic prelate who has served as Archbishop of Chieti-Vasto since 2026. He was archpriest of Saint Peter's Basilica, Vicar General for the Vatican City State and president of the Fabric of Saint Peter from 2021 to 2026. He was made a titular archbishop and a cardinal in 2020. He is a member of the Order of Friars Minor Conventual and held senior leadership positions in the order beginning in 2009. He served as General Custos of the Sacro Convento in Assisi from 2013 to 2020.

== Biography ==
Gambetti was born in Castel San Pietro Terme, Italy, on 27 October 1965. He earned a degree in mechanical engineering from the University of Bologna. He joined the Order of Friars Minor Conventual in September 1992 and took his final vows on 20 September 1998.

He obtained a bachelor's degree in theology at the Theological Institute of Assisi and a licentiate in theological anthropology at the Theological Faculty of Central Italy in Florence. He was ordained a priest on 8 January 2000 in Longiano. He was animator of youth and vocation ministry for Emilia-Romagna there and, from 2005 to 2009, also leader and animator of the religious community.

In the spring of 2009 the members of the Bologna Province, who have responsibility for the convents of the Friars Minor Conventual of Emilia-Romagna, elected him to a four-year term as their superior. He held that position until 22 February 2013 when the leadership of the order appointed him to head the General Custody of the Sacred Convent of San Francesco in Assisi for a four-year term from 2013 to 2017, with the title General Custos. At the same time, the Bishop of Assisi appointed him Episcopal Vicar for the pastoral care of the Basilica of Saint Francis of Assisi and other places of worship run by the Friars Minor Conventual in that diocese. He was confirmed for another term as Custos General in 2017.

From 2009 to 2013 he also served as president of the Italian Conference of Major Superiors (CISM) for Emilia Romagna and vice-president of the Intermediterranean Conference of Provincial Ministers (CIMP). Since 2010 he has been regional assistant of the Secular Franciscan Order (OFS) for Emilia-Romagna. He was elected President of the Intermediterranean Federation of Provincial Ministers of the Friars Minor Conventual in September 2017.

On 25 October 2020, Pope Francis announced he would raise him to the rank of cardinal at a consistory scheduled for 28 November 2020. Gambetti is the first Conventual Franciscan to be made a cardinal since 1861. His term as General Custos was due to expire in 2021 but he was instead succeeded in that position on 12 November by Father Marco Moroni. As cardinals are required to be bishops, he was consecrated a bishop on 22 November in the Basilica of Assisi by Cardinal Agostino Vallini, becoming titular archbishop of Thisiduo. At that consistory, Pope Francis made him cardinal deacon of Santissimo Nome di Maria al Foro Traiano. Gambetti became the third youngest member of the College of Cardinals. On 16 December he was named a member of the Congregation for Institutes of Consecrated Life and Societies of Apostolic Life.

On 20 February 2021, Pope Francis appointed him archpriest of Saint Peter's Basilica, Vicar General for the Vatican State, and president of the Fabric of Saint Peter. On 12 March 2021, the Vatican Secretariat of State ended the private celebration of Mass at the basilica's side altars and restricted the use of the Traditional Latin Mass to Clementine Chapel in the crypt of the basilica.

On 4 November 2021, Pope Francis named Gambetti a member of the Pontifical Commission for Vatican City State. His membership was not renewed when Pope Leo named the Commission's members on 15 October 2025.

In December 2021, Pope Francis named Gambetti chair of the newly created Fratelli tutti Vatican Foundation, formed to extend the work of the Fabric of Saint Peter, created at Gambetti's suggestion.

Gambetti participated as a cardinal elector in the 2025 papal conclave that elected Pope Leo XIV.

On 3 October 2026, Pope Leo XIV appointed Gambetti as the Metropolitan Archbishop of Chieti-Vasto.

== See also ==
- Cardinals created by Pope Francis

Catholic Church titles
Preceded by Giuseppe Piedemontese	General Custos for the Sacro Convento; 22 February 2013 – 31 October 2020	Succeeded by Marco Moroni
Preceded by Leonardo Ulrich Steiner, OFM	Titular Archbishop of Thisiduo; 31 October 2020 – 28 November 2020	Succeeded by Júlio César Gomes Moreira
Preceded by Darío Castrillón Hoyos	Cardinal-Deacon of Santissimo Nome di Maria al Foro Traiano; 28 November 2020 –	Incumbent
Preceded by Angelo Comastri	Archpriest for Saint Peter's Basilica; 20 February 2021 – 3 October 2026	Succeeded by Vittorio Francesco Viola
Preceded by Angelo Comastri	Vicar General for the Vatican State; 20 February 2021 – 3 October 2026	Succeeded by Vittorio Francesco Viola
Preceded by Angelo Comastri	President of the Fabric of Saint Peter; 20 February 2021 – 3 October 2026	Succeeded by Vittorio Francesco Viola
Preceded by Bruno Forte	Archbishop of Chieti-Vasto	Incumbent
