= Cesare Gambara =

Bishop of Tortona from 1548 to 1591

- Bishop of Tortona
- Church: Catholic Church
- See: Bishop of Tortona
- Appointed: 22 March 1548
- Term ended: 11 October 1591
- Predecessor: Uberto Gambara
- Successor: Maffeo Gambara

Orders
- Consecration: 4 October 1553 (Bishop) by Durante Duranti

Personal details
- Born: 1516 Pralboino, Republic of Venice
- Died: 11 October 1591 (aged 74–75) Pralboino, Republic of Venice
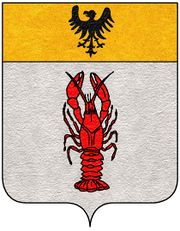
- Coat of arms

Cesare Gambara (Latin: Cesar Gambara, c. 1516–1591) was Bishop of Tortona from 1548 to 1591 and a figure of the Counter-Reformation.

== Early life ==
Cesare Gambara was born in 1516 in Pralboino, a rural area south of Brescia, into the noble Gambara family, which owned and governed the region. He likely obtained a degree in utroque iure and embarked on an ecclesiastical career around 1530. Spending some time at the papal court, he was part of the delegation sent to Emperor Charles V in Bologna to negotiate the opening of the Council of Trent. In 1546, he was appointed governor of Perugia in the Papal States, and on 22 March 1548, he ascended to the episcopal see of Tortona, following the resignation of the cousin of his father, Cardinal Uberto Gambara. However, he postponed his episcopal consecration for a few years, until 1553.

At the time, Tortona was a modest town within the Duchy of Milan. Due to its strategic location, the Spanish army had seized much of the old town on the hill to fortify it. Though the town had ancient Roman origins and had long been a bishopric, it remained sparsely populated and afflicted by severe poverty. Cesare, anticipating the decisions of the Council of Trent that would follow in the subsequent years, immediately took up residence in his diocese, though not continuously. From 1554 onwards, he began carrying out pastoral visits to the parishes. Meanwhile, on 4 October 1553, he was consecrated as a bishop in Brescia by Cardinal Durante Duranti.

The new pope, Pius IV, who was from Lombardy, appointed Cesare as Vice-Legate of Marche on 20 June 1560: in this role, Cesare successfully established a Jesuit house in Macerata. Cesare briefly took part in the final session of the Council of Trent in July and August 1563.

== Tridentine bishop ==
Believing that the main issue in his diocese, beyond poverty, was the clergy's ignorance, in 1565 Cesare established a seminary in both Tortona and nearby Voghera. While the Voghera seminary lasted only a few years, the one in Tortona managed to take off and was entrusted to the Somaschi in 1568. Cesare also attempted to reform the life of religious orders, especially female ones, in accordance with the new directives of the Council of Trent, but with little success. His years of governance over the diocese were marked by conflicts with civil authorities, particularly as Cesare persistently demanded the withdrawal of Spanish troops.

After the arrival of Cardinal Carlo Borromeo in Milan in 1565, and with Tortona being part of the Milanese ecclesiastical province, Cesare Gambara found himself under Borromeo's authority. Although Gambara was a reformer, he was still shaped by the previous tradition, while Borromeo was highly demanding. As a result, some conflicts emerged. In particular, Borromeo reproached Cesare for spending too much time in his estates in Pralboino, and for showing excessive favoritism toward his nephews.

On 26 February 1576, Gambara issued an edict titled Culto e modo di conversar nelle chiese ('Worship and Conduct in Churches'), which prohibited bringing hunting dogs and weapons into churches. It also banned the use of churches as courtrooms or places for commercial negotiations. In essence, Gambara sought to reserve churches exclusively for prayer.

During the great plague of 1577, while Saint Carlo Borromeo personally ministered to the dying, Cesare Gambara wrote to him, cautioning against needlessly testing the will of God. Given the high risk of death, Gambara did not compel his priests to administer the Eucharist to the gravely ill.

Since the old cathedral on the hill of Tortona had been confiscated by the Spanish army and repurposed as a munitions depot, Gambara began construction of a new cathedral in the lower part of the city in 1574. It was inaugurated on October 2, 1585. To improve access to credit, Cesare established mounts of piety, charitable institutions that provided low-interest loans to those in need. He also encouraged the founding of religious confraternities and set up an Inquisition tribunal within the diocese.

His conflict with Borromeo continued, and in 1576 an apostolic visitor sent from Rome, with Borromeo's agreement, proposed replacing Gambara as bishop. However, thanks to his connections in Rome, Gambara not only managed to remain in office but also secured the appointment of his nephew, Maffeo Gambara, as his successor. Cesare Gambara died in Pralboino on 11 October 1591. His remains were later transferred in the cathedral of Tortona.
