= Chieti Cathedral =

Cathedral in Chieti, Italy

Coordinates: 42.3514°N 14.1665°E

Chieti Cathedral Cattedrale di San Giustino
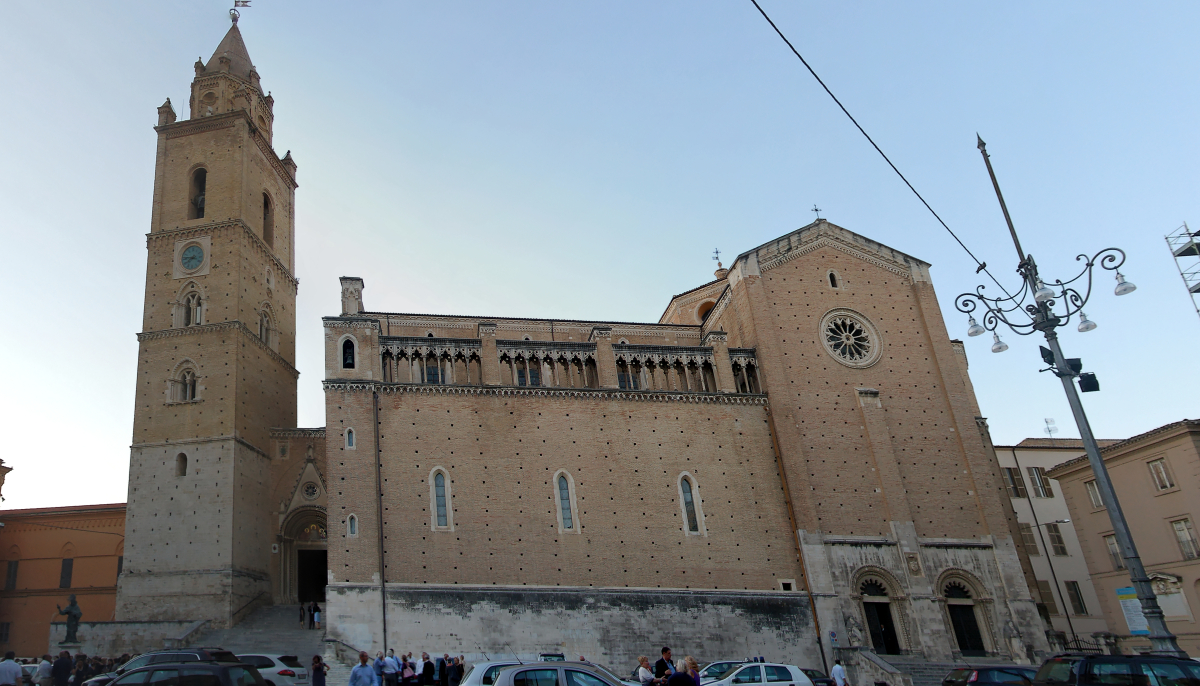
- View of the cathedral

Religion
- Affiliation: Roman Catholic
- Province: Archdiocese of Chieti-Vasto
- Region: Abruzzo
- Rite: Latin Rite

Location
- Location: Chieti
- State: Italy
- Interactive map of Chieti Cathedral; Cattedrale di San Giustino

Architecture
- Type: Church
- Style: Romanesque
- Groundbreaking: 10th century
- Completed: 20th century

Chieti Cathedral (Italian: Duomo di Chieti; Cattedrale di San Giustino) is a Roman Catholic cathedral in Chieti (Abruzzo, Italy), dedicated to Saint Justin of Chieti (San Giustino). Formerly the episcopal seat of the Diocese of Chieti, it is now the seat of the Archbishops of Chieti-Vasto.

The cathedral was constructed in the 9th century and rebuilt in the 13th.
