= Niccolò Radulovich =

Italian Roman Catholic cardinal (1627–1702)

His Eminence Niccolò Radulovich
- Cardinal-Priest of San Bartolomeo all'Isola; Archbishop of Chieti
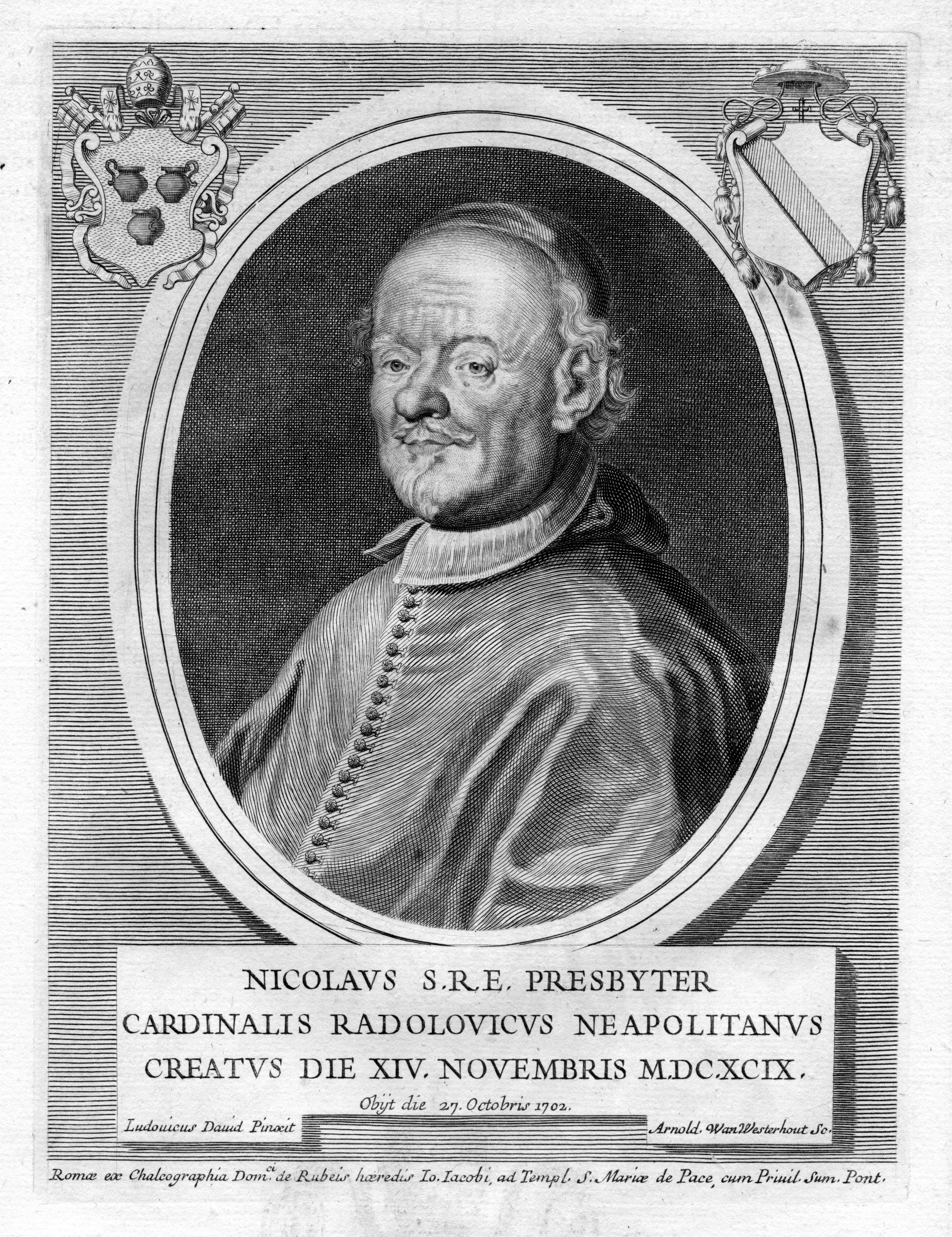
- Church: Catholic Church

Orders
- Consecration: 16 Mar 1659 by Marcantonio Franciotti
- Created cardinal: 14 Nov 1699

Personal details
- Born: 1627 Polignano, Italy
- Died: 27 Oct 1702 (age 75) Rome, Italy

Niccolò Radulovich (1627–1702) was a Roman Catholic cardinal.

== Biography ==
Niccolò Radulovich was born in 1627 in Polignano, Italy. On 16 Mar 1659, he was consecrated bishop by Marcantonio Franciotti, Cardinal-Priest of Santa Maria della Pace.

Radulovich died on 27 Oct 1702, in Rome.

While bishop, he was the principal consecrator of Oronzio Filomarini, Bishop of Gallipoli (1700) and Benito Noriega, Bishop of Acerra (1700); and the principal co-consecrator of Giulio Vincenzo Gentile, Archbishop of Genoa (1681).

Catholic Church titles
Preceded by Modesto Gavazzi	Archbishop of Chieti; 1692–1702	Succeeded by Vincenzo Capece
Preceded by Giovanni Giacomo Cavallerini	Cardinal-Priest of San Bartolomeo all'Isola; 1693–1702	Succeeded by Francesco Acquaviva d'Aragona
