= Stefano Sauli =

Italian Roman Catholic prelate (died 1649)

Most Reverend Stefano Sauli
- Archbishop of Chieti
- Church: Catholic Church
- Diocese: Archdiocese of Chieti
- In office: 1638–1649
- Predecessor: Antonio Santacroce
- Successor: Vincenzo Rabatta

Orders
- Consecration: 21 November 1638 by Alessandro Cesarini (iuniore)

Personal details
- Died: 1649 Chieti, Italy

Stefano Sauli (died 1649) was a Roman Catholic prelate who served as Archbishop of Chieti (1638–1649).

== Biography ==
Stefano Sauli was born in 1649. On 10 November 1638, he was appointed during the papacy of Pope Urban VIII as Archbishop of Chieti. On 21 November 1638, he was consecrated bishop by Alessandro Cesarini (iuniore), Cardinal-Deacon of Sant'Eustachio, with Alfonso Gonzaga, Titular Archbishop of Rhodus, and Tommaso Carafa, Bishop Emeritus of Vulturara e Montecorvino, serving as co-consecrators. He served as Archbishop of Chieti until his death in 1649.

== External links and additional sources ==
- Cheney, David M. "Archdiocese of Chieti-Vasto". Catholic-Hierarchy.org. (for Chronology of Bishops) ^{[self-published]}
- Chow, Gabriel. "Archdiocese of Chieti-Vasto (Italy)". GCatholic.org. (for Chronology of Bishops) ^{[self-published]}

Catholic Church titles
Preceded by Antonio Santacroce	Archbishop of Chieti; 1638–1649	Succeeded by Vincenzo Rabatta
