= Giovanni Barbavara =

Roman Catholic bishop (?-1460)

Most Reverend Giovanni Barbavara
- Bishop of Tortona
- Church: Catholic Church
- Diocese: Diocese of Tortona
- In office: 1437–1460
- Predecessor: Enrico Rampini
- Successor: Michele Marliani
- Previous post: Bishop of Como (1435–1437)

Personal details
- Died: 1460 Tortona, Italy

Giovanni (Michele) Barbavara (died 1460) was a Roman Catholic prelate, and member of a noble Novara family, Barbavara of Gravellona. He was closely related to Francesco Barbavara who was the chancellor to the Duke of Milan, Gian Galeazzo Visconti. He was the brother of Marcolino Barbavara, who was the Milanese ambassador to Rome, Francesco Barbavara II and Pietro Barbavara, apostolic protonotary. Another close relative was Antonio Barbavara the Abbot of the Abbey of Saints Nazario and Celso. In the village of Villareale, east of Cassolnovo, where his family had a castle, there is a road named after him. He reportedly attended the Papal Council of Basel. He was a teacher in the University of Pavia from (1429-1434) and later he served as Bishop of Como (1435–1437) and Bishop of Tortona (1437–1460).

== Biography ==
On 13 June 1435, Giovanni Barbavara, the son of Giacomo Barbavara, was appointed during the papacy of Pope Eugene IV as Bishop of Como. On 6 March 1437, he was appointed during the papacy of Pope Eugene IV as Bishop of Tortona. He served as Bishop of Tortona until his death in 1460.

== External links and additional sources ==
- Cheney, David M. "Diocese of Como". Catholic-Hierarchy.org. (for Chronology of Bishops) ^{[self-published]}
- Chow, Gabriel. "Diocese of Como (Italy)". GCatholic.org. (for Chronology of Bishops) ^{[self-published]}
- Cheney, David M. "Diocese of Tortona". Catholic-Hierarchy.org. (for Chronology of Bishops) ^{[self-published]}
- Chow, Gabriel. "Diocese of Tortona (Italy)". GCatholic.org. (for Chronology of Bishops) ^{[self-published]}

Catholic Church titles
Preceded by	Bishop of Como; 1435–1437	Succeeded by Gerardo Landriani
Preceded by Enrico Rampini	Bishop of Tortona; 1437–1460	Succeeded by Michele Marliani
