= Bruno Forte =

Italian Catholic prelate (born 1949)

The Most Reverend Bruno Forte
- Metropolitan Archbishop emeritus of Chieti-Vasto
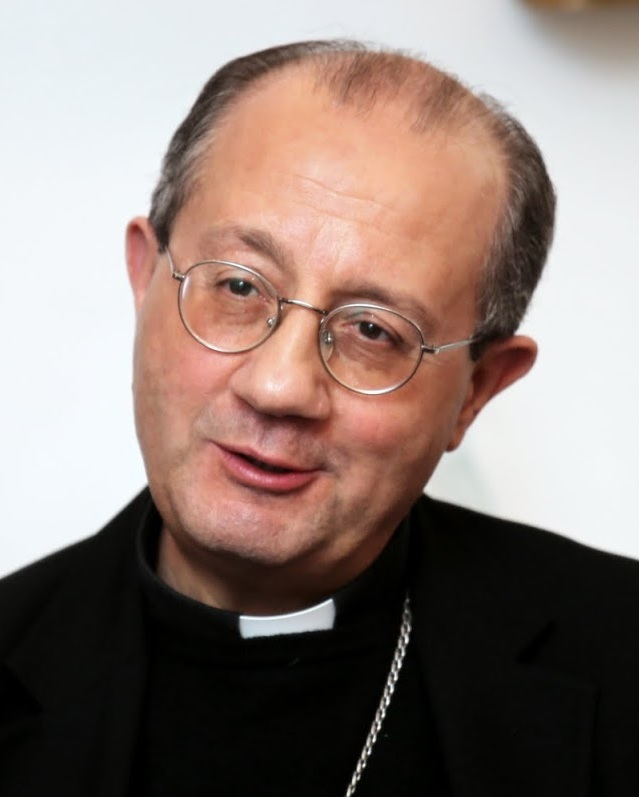
- Archdiocese: Chieti-Vasto
- See: Chieti-Vasto
- Appointed: 26 June 2004
- Installed: 25 September 2004
- Term ended: 3 October 2026
- Predecessor: Edoardo Menichelli
- Successor: Mons. Mauro Gambetti, O.F.M. Conv.

Orders
- Ordination: 18 April 1973 by Corrado Ursi
- Consecration: 8 September 2004 by Joseph Ratzinger, Michele Giordano, and Luigi Diligenza

Personal details
- Born: Bruno Forte; 1 August 1949 (age 77) Naples, Italy
- Denomination: Roman Catholic
- Education: University of Naples Federico II
- Motto: Lumen vitae Christus
- Coat of arms

Bruno Forte (born 1 August 1949) is an Italian Catholic prelate who has served as Metropolitan Archbishop of Chieti-Vasto from 2004 until his retirement in 2026.

== Biography ==
Archbishop Forte was born in Naples. He was ordained a priest on 18 April 1973. He studied at Tübingen University, associated with Hans Küng, Joseph Ratzinger and Walter Kasper. He also spent time in Paris, before gaining a Laurea degree in philosophy from Naples University.

He is described by the Catholic Herald as being known in Italy and the rest of the Catholic world as a "prolific and remarkably well-connected theologian", while Rocco Palmo considered him to be "more progressive" than Cardinal Joseph Ratzinger.

In 2000, he oversaw the preparation of the Vatican document, "Memory and Reconciliation: The Church and the Faults of the Past", which led to the famous liturgy in St Peter's Basilica in which John Paul II asked God's forgiveness for 2,000 years of sins. John Paul II asked him to preach the Vatican's Lenten Spiritual Exercises in 2004.

He was appointed Archbishop of Chieti-Vasto by Pope John Paul II on 26 June 2004. He was consecrated bishop by Cardinal Ratzinger (later Pope Benedict XVI) on 8 September 2004; he is one of only 26 bishops consecrated by the former Pope.

After the election of Pope Benedict XVI, Forte was seen by some as a possible successor to become Prefect of the Congregation for the Doctrine of the Faith, before William Levada was chosen.

Styles of Bruno Forte
- Reference style: The Most Reverend
- Spoken style: His Excellency
- Religious style: Monsignor
- Posthumous style: not applicable

On 5 January 2011 he was appointed among the first members of the newly created Pontifical Council for the Promotion of the New Evangelisation.

On Monday, 14 October 2013, the Archbishop was appointed by Pope Francis to serve as the Special Secretary of the Third Extraordinary General Assembly of the Synod of Bishops on "The challenges of the family in the context of evangelisation", scheduled from 5–19 October 2014.

On Wednesday, 16 July 2014, Archbishop Forte was appointed by Pope Francis to serve a five-year term as a Consultant to the Congregation for Institutes of Consecrated Life and Societies of Apostolic Life (for Religious).

In October 2014, Pope Francis added him to the group responsible for summarising the first week of discussions at the Synod on the Family. According to John L. Allen, the resulting document was "widely known to carry the imprint of Italian Archbishop Bruno Forte, one of the more noted theological minds in the Italian hierarchy".

In November 2016, Mgr. Forte was elected President of the Abruzzo and Molise regional section of the Episcopal Conference of Italy. On 11 January 2021 he was succeeded by the cardinal Giuseppe Petrocchi.

In October 2026, Pope Leo XIV accepted his resignation as Archbishop of Chieti-Vasto. Appointing Cardinal Mauro Maria Gambetti, then Archpriest of Saint Peter's Basilica and Vicar General for the Vatican City State as his successor.

Catholic Church titles
Preceded by Edoardo Menichelli	Archbishop of Chieti-Vasto; 26 June 2004 – 3 October 2026	Succeeded by Mauro Gambetti
