= Vincenzo Rabatta =

17th-century Roman Catholic bishop

Most Reverend Vincenzo Rabatta
- Archbishop of Chieti
- Church: Catholic Church
- Diocese: Archdiocese of Chieti
- In office: 1649–1654
- Predecessor: Stefano Sauli
- Successor: Angelo Maria Ciria Panvini

Orders
- Consecration: 2 Jan 1650 by Marcantonio Franciotti

Personal details
- Born: 1589 Pescia, Italy
- Died: 1654 (aged 65-66)

Vincenzo Rabatta (1589–1654) was a Roman Catholic prelate who served as Archbishop of Chieti (1649–1654).

== Biography ==
Vincenzo Rabatta was born in 1589 in Pescia, Italy. On 9 Dec 1649, he was appointed during the papacy of Pope Innocent X as Archbishop of Chieti. On 2 Jan 1650, he was consecrated bishop by Marcantonio Franciotti, Cardinal-Priest of Santa Maria della Pace, with Giovanni Battista Rinuccini, Archbishop of Fermo, and Giambattista Spínola (seniore), Archbishop of Acerenza e Matera, serving as co-consecrators. He served as Archbishop of Chieti until his death in 1654.

== External links and additional sources ==
- Cheney, David M. "Archdiocese of Chieti-Vasto". Catholic-Hierarchy.org. (for Chronology of Bishops) ^{[self-published]}
- Chow, Gabriel. "Archdiocese of Chieti-Vasto (Italy)". GCatholic.org. (for Chronology of Bishops) ^{[self-published]}

Catholic Church titles
Preceded by Stefano Sauli	Archbishop of Chieti; 1649–1654	Succeeded by Angelo Maria Ciria Panvini
