= Diocese of Tortona =

Roman Catholic diocese in Italy

Coordinates: 44.9000°N 8.8667°E

Diocese of Tortona Dioecesis Derthonensis

Catholic
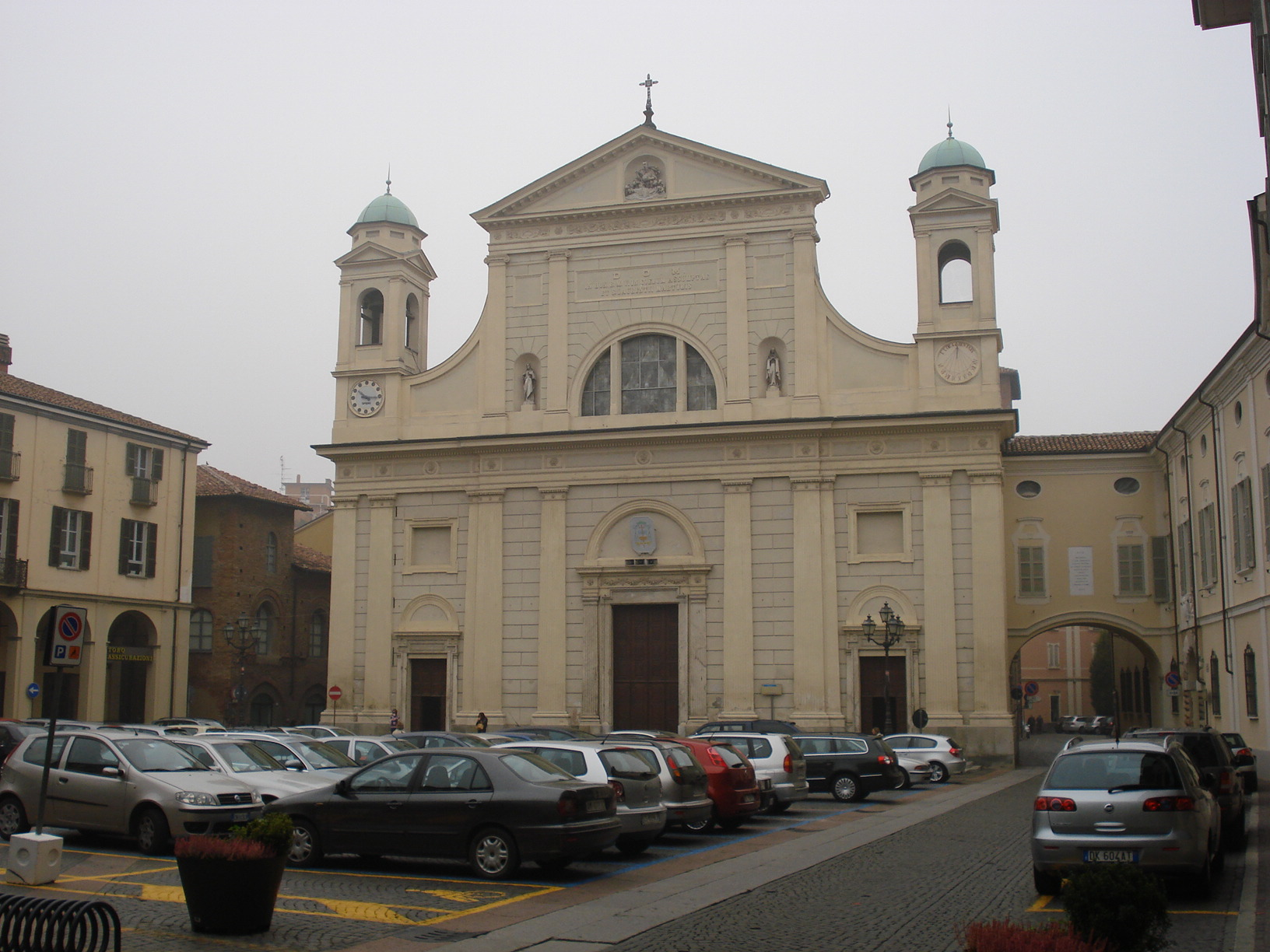
- Tortona Cathedral and Bishop's Palace on the right

Location
- Country: Italy
- Ecclesiastical province: Genoa

Statistics
- Area: 2,350 km^{2} (910 sq mi)
- Population: Total; Catholics: (as of 2020); 282,420 (est.); 275,912
- Parishes: 314

Information
- Denomination: Catholic Church
- Sui iuris church: Latin Church
- Rite: Roman Rite
- Established: 4th Century
- Cathedral: Cattedrale di S. Maria Assunta e. S. Lorenzo
- Secular priests: 93 (diocesan); 57 (Religious Orders); 17 Permanent Deacons

Current leadership
- Pope: Leo XIV
- Bishop: Guido Marini
- Bishops emeritus: Martino Canessa

Website
- www.diocesitortona.it

The Diocese of Tortona (Latin: Dioecesis Derthonensis) is a Latin Church ecclesiastical territory or diocese of the Catholic Church in Northern Italy, spanning parts of three regions of Piedmont (Province of Alessandria), Lombardy (Province of Pavia) and Liguria (Province of Genoa). It is a suffragan diocese in the ecclesiastical province of the metropolitan Archdiocese of Genoa and forms part of the ecclesiastical region of Liguria. The diocese claims to be one of the oldest in Lombardy and the Piedmont.

== History ==
According to legend, which is, however, a late one, the first Bishop of Tortona was Marcian of Tortona martyred under the Emperor Hadrian. Francesco Lanzoni has pointed out that the list of bishops that leads back to Marcian of Tortona is a compilation of the 16th century and that its contents are highly suspect. Additionally, the story of Bishop Marcian depends on a hagiographical source of the 10th century, which is full of anachronisms. Fedele Savio points out that the earliest document referring to Marcian was written between 729 and 820, and that it neither calls Marcian a bishop nor the Bishop of Tortona; and, as he points out, the letter of Bishop Eusebius of Vercelli, written to the people of Tortona from his exile in Scythopolis in 356, makes no mention of a bishop. The Bishop of Tortona, Vincenzo Capelli, nonetheless organized an event in October 1875 to celebrate the 18th centenary of Martianus' episcopal consecration.

In the first half of the fourth century, Tortona was a suffragan of the diocese of Milan.

The first bishop, according to Fedele Savio, was St. Innocentius, who in his opinion was the immediate predecessor of St. Exuperantius (381), the first of whom we have certain historical record, and who was highly praised in a sermon of Maximus of Turin (or of Ambrose of Milan). Few other names of bishops of the early period are known; but from the tenth century the list is more complete.

In 877, Pope John VIII, fearful of the continued Saracen raids on the west coast of Italy, begged for assistance from the Emperor Charles the Bald. When he arrived in Italy, Charles met the Pope at Pavia, but was discomfited to discover that his own Viceroy for Italy, Boso, and the Italian nobility were unenthusiastic about proposed operations. Then, Carloman of Bavaria, seizing the opportunity to recover the kingdom in Italy of his father, Louis the German, crossed the Alps into Italy with his army. Charles and the Pope retreated to Tortona, where, Pope Gregory crowned Charles' wife Richilde as Empress. Charles then began his retreat into Provence, but died in the Mont Cenis pass on 6 October 877.

In the 1120s, Bishop Peter caused considerable trouble by illegally and uncanonically taking control of five parishes belonging to the diocese of Bobbio. The Bishop of Bobbio complained to the Pope, and therefore, on 26 November 1128, Pope Honorius II decreed that Bishop Peter should return those churches immediately; if he still had issues, he could bring them to the papal Court. In 1180 Bishop Oberto was one of four bishops who were found to be illegally occupying parishes belonging to the Monastery of S. Maria Theodota, and they were all ordered by Pope Alexander III to return the lands in question. The demands had to be repeated for a decade, by Popes Lucius III, Urban III, and Gregory VIII.

Another Bishop Pietro was one of those who in 1241 were made prisoners by Emperor Frederick II at the Battle of Giglio, while on their way to attend a council in Rome called by Pope Gregory IX. Bishop Melchiorre Busseto in 1284 was killed by the followers of William VII, Marquess of Montferrat, for which the Marquess lost all his rights of patronage in the Diocese of Tortona, and was compelled, barefoot and clad in a shirt only, to walk from the scene of the bishop's murder to the cathedral.

Bishop Melchior Busetto (1255–1284) was responsible for building the Hospitale San Michele, as well as the parish church of Sant'Andrea, which collapsed in ruins in 1622.

In the time of Michele Marliano (1461) the body of St. Rochus was found at Voghera, which was the cause of a lengthy controversy with Arles, which possessed the relics of St. Rochus of Montpellier.

Uberto Gambara (1528–1548) was a papal diplomat, who began his career as Nuncio to Portugal, and then, in 1527 to Henry VIII of England, from whom he was to beg military assistance against the Emperor Charles V. He returned to Rome without success, and carrying the request of Cardinal Wolsey to be granted plenipotentiary powers to settle the divorce of Henry VIII and Catherine of Aragon. When Clement VII was imprisoned in the Castel S. Angelo by the forces of Charles V, Gambara was sent to France to beg assistance from King Francis I in obtaining the Pope's release. He was named papal Governor of Bologna after the sack of Rome, and continued to serve in that office after being appointed Bishop of Tortona by Pope Clement VII. During his years as Bishop of Tortona, he participated in the Coronation of Charles V as Emperor in Bologna in 1532, and was absent as papal legate or nuncio in Germany (1532). He was named a cardinal on 10 December 1539 by Pope Paul III, who then named him Legate in Parma and Piacenza. In 1548 he renounced the bishopric in favour of his relative Cesare Gambara, who participated in the Council of Trent. Maffeo Gambara (1592) was a reformer, as was the Theatine Paolo Aresio (1620).

The first Jesuits appeared in the diocese of Tortona in 1566, after negotiations which had lasted nearly two years.

=== Cathedral and Chapter ===
The original cathedral was said to have been founded on the citadel of Tortona in the second half of the 4th century by Bishop Innocentius. It was dedicated to S. Sixtus and S. Lawrence, though the name of Sixtus was subsequently omitted, and that of Innocentius added. In 945 or 946 Bishop Giseprando (943–after 963) added the name of S. Martianus to the list of patrons of the cathedral. The cathedral was severely damaged and pillaged after the siege of Tortona by Frederick Barbarossa in 1155, and again in 1163. The plight of Tortona was made greater due to the firm support of Bishop Oberto for the legitimate Pope Alexander III rather than the Emperor's antipope Victor IV.

In 1236 Bishop Petrus Busetto (1221–1255) compiled a set of Statutes for the Cathedral Chapter. He ordered that there be sixteen Canons: four priests, four deacons, four subdeacons, and four acolytes.

In 1553, the Canons were compelled by the Spanish government of the Emperor Charles V to relinquish the property. A new cathedral was built on property which had once been the church of S. Quirinus, and was dedicated in 1583 in the name of the Virgin Mary and S. Lawrence.

The Chapter of the Cathedral was composed of five dignities (the Archdeacon, the Provost, the Primicerius, the Archpriest, and the Dean) and eighteen Canons (one of whom was the Theologus, another the Penitentiary). Pope Alexander III in 1177 had ordered that the number of Canons should not exceed sixteen. This ruling was later confirmed by Clement III and Celestine III. In one letter, Celestine III reveals that the number of Canons had once been forty-two. In the 1180s, Bishop Oberto and the Cathedral Chapter had fallen to disputing, and to solve his difficulties, the Bishop had installed ten new Canons in one single event, bringing loud protests from the Chapter which reached Rome. The Pope ordered Milo, the Archbishop of Milan, and the Papal Legate Peter of Santa Cecilia to intervene and cancel the appointments as illegal (irritum) if they contravened papal bulls.

=== Synods ===
On 25 January 1074, Pope Gregory VII summoned all the bishops of the ecclesiastical province of Milan, including the bishop of Tortona (whose name is unfortunately not mentioned), to a synod to be held in Rome on the first Sunday of Lent.

A diocesan synod was an irregular but important meeting of the bishop of a diocese and his clergy. Its purpose was (1) to proclaim generally the various decrees already issued by the bishop; (2) to discuss and ratify measures on which the bishop chose to consult with his clergy; (3) to publish statutes and decrees of the provincial synod and of the Holy See.

In May 1435 Bishop Enrico Rampini di Sant'Allosio presided over a synod held in the church of S. Domenico in Tortona. A diocesan synod was held in 1595 by Bishop Maffeo Gambara (1592–1612). A synod was held by Bishop Cosimo Dossena (1612–1620) on 25 October 1615. Bishop Giovanni Francesco Fossati, O.S.B. (1644–1653) held two synods, the second in 1652. Bishop Carlo Settala (1653–1682) presided over a synod held in Tortona on 22–24 April 1659; he held another on 12–14 September 1673. Bishop Carlo Francesco Ceva (1683–1700) held a synod on 13 May 1687; he held his second synod on 18–20 May 1699. On 10–12 September 1715, Bishop Giulio Resta (1701–1743) held a diocesan synod. Bishop Giovanni Negri held a diocesan synod on 6–8 September 1843.

=== French occupation ===
In spring 1799, Pope Pius VI, who had been driven from Rome and compelled to live at Siena and then in the Certosa near Florence, was under arrest and being conducted by the troops of the French Directory to imprisonment in France. The Austrian army in the Po Valley was advancing toward Piacenza, and the French were anxious to avoid the capture of their hostages. The cortege did not dare to cross the Po, and therefore had to choose another route for Turin. On 19 April his guard reached Tortona. The Pope was received with great emotion by the people of the neighborhood who had flocked to the highway to see him. In the city he was welcomed by crowds and conducted to the episcopal palace by Bishop Fossati. The commander of the French guard, Mongen, was determined that the Pope and the Bishop should not share the same building even for a single night, but ultimately the Bishop won and undertook the position of Chamberlain to the ailing Pope. During his stay, he remained in bed the whole time, receiving visitors singly or in small groups, as arranged by the Bishop. The visit lasted one day, since the French captain, despite the protestations of even the resident French Sub-Intendant in Tortona, the Pope was forced to take to the road again, since the schedule which the French guard had been given specified that the Pope arrive in Alessandria on 20 April. Pius VI died four months later, imprisoned in the prison-fortress at Valence.

In 1802 all of the religious orders in the diocese were suppressed, in accordance with laws passed by the French Constitutional Assembly. The Jesuits had previously been suppressed, by Pope Clement XIV on August 16, 1773, through the Bull Dominus ac Redemptor Noster.

In 1803 the diocese was suppressed by Pope Pius VII, by the Bull, Gravissimis causis (1 June 1803), under pressure from the French Government of First Consul N. Bonaparte, and united with the diocese of Alessandria. In a decree of 17 July 1805, however, Cardinal Giovanni Battista Caprara, the Papal Legate in Paris, who had been given special powers by Pius VII, redrew the boundaries of the dioceses of Piedmont, and made Tortona a part of the diocese of Casale, which was made a suffragan of the diocese of Turin. The former diocese of Tortona was made part of the French department of Marengo. The three former cathedrals of the suppressed dioceses, including Tortona, were reduced to the status of Collegiate Churches and their Canons became members of Collegiate Chapters.

On its re-establishment as a separate and independent diocese by the Bull Beati Petri (17 July 1817) of Pope Pius VII, the diocese was taken from the metropolitan see of Turin and made suffragan to Genoa. The Bull was published in Tortona on 20 November 1817.

=== Restoration of the diocese ===
Bishop Carlo Francesco Carnevale (1818–1831), the first post-suppression bishop, ordered the restoration of the Collegiate Churches of Broni, Casèi, Castelnuovo, Viguzzolo, and Voghera. There were also Collegiate churches at San Andrea in Novi Ligure, Pontecurone and Serravalle.

A new diocesan seminary was rebuilt, under the direction of Bishop Carlo Francesco Carnevale (1818–1831), on the property which had formerly been the monastery of S. Eufemia. The minor seminary was separate from the major seminary, though they were both housed in the same building, which had a capacity of 200. The complex, which included a public library, was opened in 1829.

Two religious orders, the Capuchins and the Clerci Regulari Ministeri Infirmaribus (Camillians), were reestablished in the diocese following the departure of the French. The Camillians were granted the administratorship of the parish of S. Matteo in the city of Tortona. The Jesuits were restored in the diocese by Bishop Giovanni Negri (1833–1874) on 17 November 1847.

== Bishops ==
=== to 1300 ===
- Innocentius (after 363 – before 381)
- Exuperantius (attested 381)

...

- Quintus (or Quintianus) (attested 451)

...
[Saturninus (499)]
...

- Probus (attested 626)
- Malliodorus (attested 649)
- Audax (attested 679)

...

- Josephus (attested 769)

...

- Joannes (c. 830)
- Ermanfredus (attested 842)
- Theodolfus (attested 862, 877)
- Geroardus (attested 901)
- Beatus (c. 915 – c. 930)
- Andreas (attested 933)
- Giseprando (943 – after 963)
- Joannes (attested 967, 969)
- Gerebertus (attested 979–983)
- Litifredus (997–1002)
- Thenus (attested 1003)
- ? Agirius (attested 1015)
- Petrus (attested 1022, 1044, 1047, 1067, 1068)
- Otto (attested 1080, 1083)
- Guido (Wido) (attested 1098, 1099)
- Lombardo (c. 1107)
- Pietro (attested 1114, 1120, 1127)
- Guglielmo
- Oberto (attested 1155, 1181)
- Ugo (attested 1183, 1193)
- ? Gandolfo
- Oddo (c, 1196 – 1202)
- Obizo (1202–1220)
- Petrus Busetto (1221–1255)
- Petrus de Tassis (attested 1255)
- Melchior Busetto (1255–1284)

Sede vacante (1284–1295)

- Jacobus Calcinari (1295–1316)

=== from 1300 to 1817 ===
- Tiberius Torriani (1317–1325)
- Percevallus Fieschi (1325–1348)
- Jacobus Visconti (1348–1364)
- Giovanni de Ceva (1364–c. 1380)
- Giorgio di Torti (1380–1393)
- Antonio (1393–1394)
- Pietro (Petracinus) de Georgiis (1394–1413)
- Enrico Rampini (1413–1435)
- Giovanni Barbavara (1437–1460)
- Michele Marliani (1461–1475 Appointed, Bishop of Piacenza)
- Fabrizio Marliani (1475–1476)
- Jacopo Botta (1476–1496)
- Gian Domenico de Zazi (1496–1528)
- Uberto Gambara (1528–1548 Resigned)
- Cesare Gambara (1548–1591)
- Maffeo Gambara (1592–1612)
- Cosimo Dossena, B. (1612–1620)
- Paolo Arese, C.R. (1620–1644 Resigned)
- Giovanni Francesco Fossati, O.S.B. (1644–1653)
- Carlo Settala (1653–1682)
- Carlo Francesco Ceva (1683–1700)
- Giulio Resta (1701–1743)
- Giuseppe Luigi de Andujar, O.P. (1743–1782)
- Carlo Maurizio Peiretti (1783–1793)

Sede vacante (1793–1796)

- Pio Bonifacio Fassati, O.P. (1796–1803 Resigned)

Diocese suppressed (1803–1817)

=== since 1818 ===
- Carlo Francesco Carnevale (1818–1831)
- Giovanni Negri (1833–1874)
- Vincenzo Capelli (1874–1890)
- Igino Bandi (1890–1914)
- Simone Pietro Grassi (1914–1934)
- Egisto Domenico Melchiori (1934–1963)
- Francesco Rossi (1963–1969 Resigned)
- Giovanni Canestri (1971–1975 Appointed, Vicegerent of Rome)
- Luigi Bongianino (1975–1996 Retired)
- Martino Canessa (1996–2014 Retired)
- Vittorio Francesco Viola, O.F.M. (2014 – 2021)
- Guido Marini (2021 – present)

== Parishes ==
A list of the parishes in the Diocese of Tortona is contained in the volume of decrees of the Synod of Tortona of 1673. The state and organization of the parishes of the diocese of Tortona at the time of the re-erection of the diocese in 1817 is discussed extensively by Pollini. The 314 parishes of the diocese in the 21st century are listed by (civil) region, province and commune. The Diocese of Tortona maintains a list of parishes on its own website. In 2014 there was one priest for every 1,674 Catholics.

Cardinal Carlo Alberto Guidoboni Cavalchini (1683-1774), the pro-Datary of Pope Clement XIV, a native of Tortona and a former student of the Jesuit College of Tortona, carried out the reconstruction of the parish church of S. Giacomo in Tortona.

== Books ==
=== Reference works ===
- Gams, Pius Bonifatius (1873). Series episcoporum Ecclesiae catholicae: quotquot innotuerunt a beato Petro apostolo. Ratisbon: Typis et Sumptibus Georgii Josephi Manz. pp. 823–824. (Use with caution; obsolete)
- Eubel, Conradus, ed. (1913). Hierarchia catholica, Tomus 1 (in Latin) (second ed.). Münster: Libreria Regensbergiana. p. 476.
- Eubel, Conradus, ed. (1914). Hierarchia catholica, Tomus 2 (in Latin) (second ed.). Münster: Libreria Regensbergiana. p. 247.
- Eubel, Conradus, ed. (1923). Hierarchia catholica, Tomus 3 (second ed.). Münster: Libreria Regensbergiana. p. 186.
- Gauchat, Patritius (1935). Hierarchia catholica IV (1592-1667). Münster: Libraria Regensbergiana. pp. 173–174.
- Ritzler, Remigius; Sefrin, Pirminus (1952). Hierarchia catholica medii et recentis aevi V (1667-1730). Patavii: Messagero di S. Antonio. p. 183.
- Ritzler, Remigius; Sefrin, Pirminus (1958). Hierarchia catholica medii et recentis aevi VI (1730-1799). Patavii: Messagero di S. Antonio. p. 194.
- Ritzler, Remigius; Sefrin, Pirminus (1968). Hierarchia Catholica medii et recentioris aevi sive summorum pontificum, S. R. E. cardinalium, ecclesiarum antistitum series... A pontificatu Pii PP. VII (1800) usque ad pontificatum Gregorii PP. XVI (1846) (in Latin). Vol. VII. Monasterii: Libr. Regensburgiana.
- Remigius Ritzler; Pirminus Sefrin (1978). Hierarchia catholica Medii et recentioris aevi... A Pontificatu PII PP. IX (1846) usque ad Pontificatum Leonis PP. XIII (1903) (in Latin). Vol. VIII. Il Messaggero di S. Antonio.
- Pięta, Zenon (2002). Hierarchia catholica medii et recentioris aevi... A pontificatu Pii PP. X (1903) usque ad pontificatum Benedictii PP. XV (1922) (in Latin). Vol. IX. Padua: Messagero di San Antonio. ISBN 978-88-250-1000-8.

=== Studies ===
- Bellomo, Elena (2008). The Templar Order in North-west Italy: (1142 - C. 1330). Boston-Leiden: Brill. ISBN 978-90-04-16364-5.
- Bottazzi, Giuseppe Antonio (1808). Le antichità di Tortona e suo agro (in Italian). Alessandria: Salvatore Rossi.
- Broers, Michael (2005). The Napoleonic Empire in Italy, 1796-1814: Cultural Imperialism in a European Context?. New York: Palgrave Macmillan UK. ISBN 978-0-230-00574-7.
- Cappellaro, Camillo (1968). Mons. Giovanni Negri, Vescovo di Tortona: 1833-1874 (in Italian). Roma: Pontificia Università Lateranense.
- Cappelletti, Giuseppe (1857). Le chiese d'Italia della loro origine sino ai nostri giorni (in Italian). Vol. decimoterzo (13). Venezia: Giuseppe Antonelli. pp. 665–695.
- Carnevale, Giacomo (1838). Notizie per servire alla biografia degli uomini illustri Tortonesi (in Italian). Vigevano: Pietro Vitali e compagnia. [highly inaccurate, making unsubstantiated claims of connections to Tortona]
- Carnevale, Giacomo (1845). Notizie storiche dell'antico, e moderno Tortonese (in Italian). Vol. I. Voghera: Tipografia di Cesare Giani.
- Gabotto Ferdinando; Legé, Vincenzo, eds. (1905). Le carte dello Archivio capitolare di Tortona, sec. IX-1220. Biblioteca della Società Storica Subalpina, XXIX (in Italian and Latin). Pinerolo: Chinatore-Mascarelli.
- Kehr, Paul Fridolin (1914). Italia pontificia : sive, Repertorium privilegiorum et litterarum a romanis pontificibus ante annum 1598 Italiae ecclesiis, monasteriis, civitatibus singulisque personis concessorum. Vol. VI. pars ii. Berolini: Weidmann. pp. 212–240.
- Lanzoni, Francesco (1927). Le diocesi d'Italia dalle origini al principio del secolo VII (an. 604). Faenza: F. Lega, pp. 820-828. (in Italian)
- Majocchi, Piero; Montanari, Mirella (2002). I vescovi dell'Italia settentrionale nel basso Medioevo: cronotassi per le diocesi di Cremona, Pavia e Tortona nei secoli XIV e XV (in Italian). Università di Pavia. pp. 85 ff. ISBN 978-88-7963-140-2.
- Pagano, Sergio M. (2003). Paesi infetti: magia, eresia e faide familiari nel tortonese durante il secolo 16 (in Italian). Roma: Gangemi. ISBN 978-88-492-0501-5.
- Pollini, Luigi (1889). Memorie storiche intorno ai successori di s. Marziano, primo vescovo di Tortona ed alla chiesa tortonese (in Italian). Tortona: A. Rossi.
- Savio, Fedele (1898). Gli antichi Vescovi d'Italia: il Piemonte (in Italian). Torino: Bocca.
- Schwartz, Gerhard (1907). Die Besetzung der Bistümer Reichsitaliens unter den sächsischen und salischen Kaisern: mit den Listen der Bischöfe, 951-1122. Leipzig: B.G. Teubner. (in German)
