= Giovanni Giacomo Cavallerini =

His Eminence Giovanni Giacomo Cavallerini
- Cardinal-Priest of San Bartolomeo all'Isola
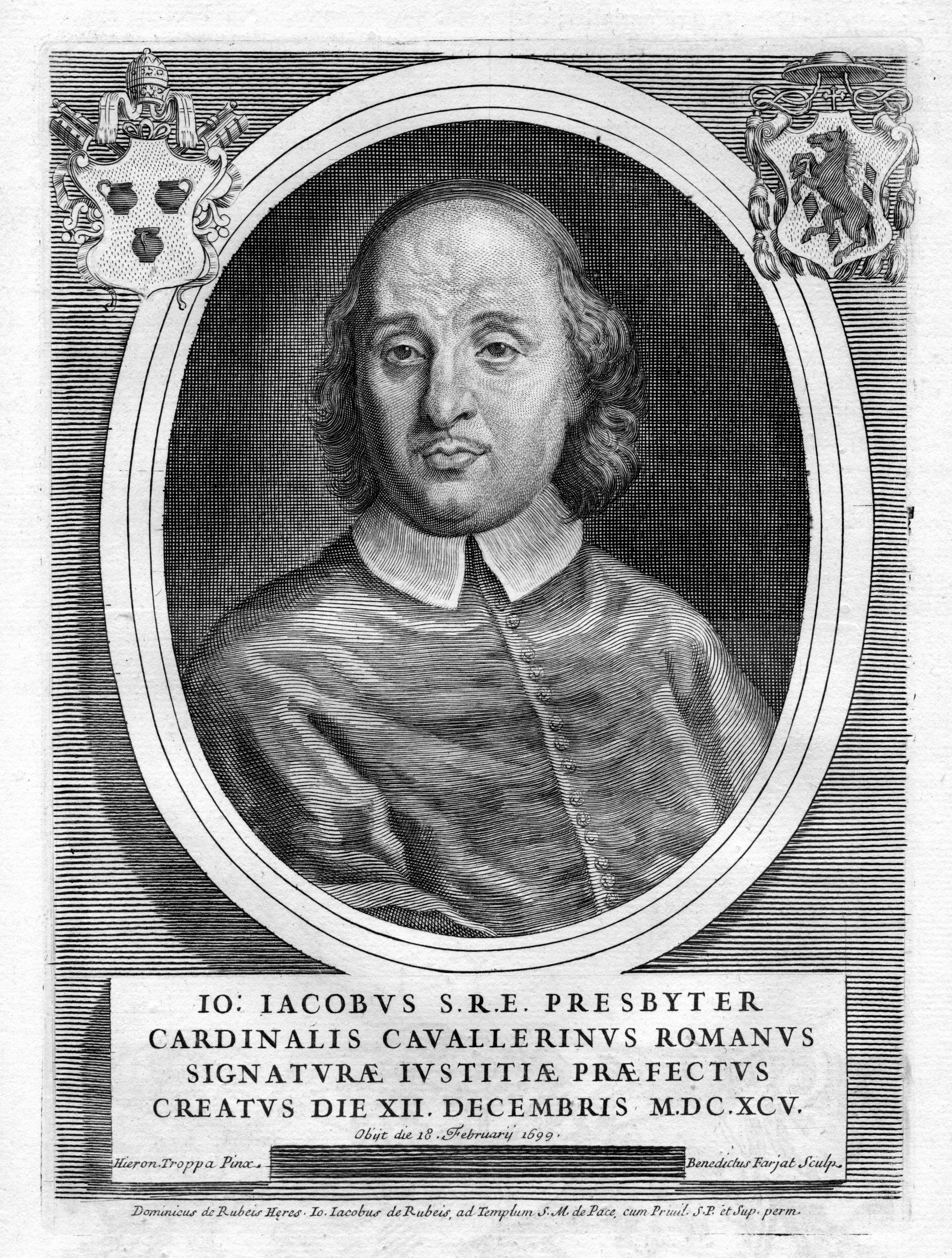
- Portrait of Giovanni Giacomo Cavallerini
- Church: Catholic Church
- Previous post: Apostolic Nuncio to France (1692–1696)

Orders
- Consecration: 30 Jun 1692 by Fabrizio Spada

Personal details
- Born: 16 Feb 1639 Rome, Italy
- Died: 18 Feb 1699 (age 60) Rome, Italy

Giovanni Giacomo Cavallerini (1639–1699) was a Roman Catholic cardinal.

== Biography ==
Giovanni Giacomo Cavallerini was born on 16 Feb 1639 in Rome. On 30 Jun 1692, he was consecrated bishop by Fabrizio Spada, Cardinal-Priest of San Crisogono, with Michelangelo Mattei, Titular Archbishop of Hadrianopolis in Haemimonto, and Baldassare Cenci (seniore), Titular Archbishop of Larissa in Thessalia, serving as co-consecrators.

Cavallerini died on 18 Feb 1699 in Rome, Italy.

Catholic Church titles
Preceded by Carlo Vaini	Titular Archbishop of Nicaea; 1692–1696	Succeeded by Tommaso Ruffo
Preceded by Francesco Niccolini	Apostolic Nuncio to France; 1692–1696	Succeeded by Daniello Marco Delfino
Preceded by Johann Eberhard Nidhard	Cardinal-Priest of San Bartolomeo all'Isola; 1693–1699	Succeeded by Niccolò Radulovich
