= Sacro Convento =

Franciscan friary in Assisi, Umbria, Italy

Coordinates: 43°04′29″N 12°36′20″E

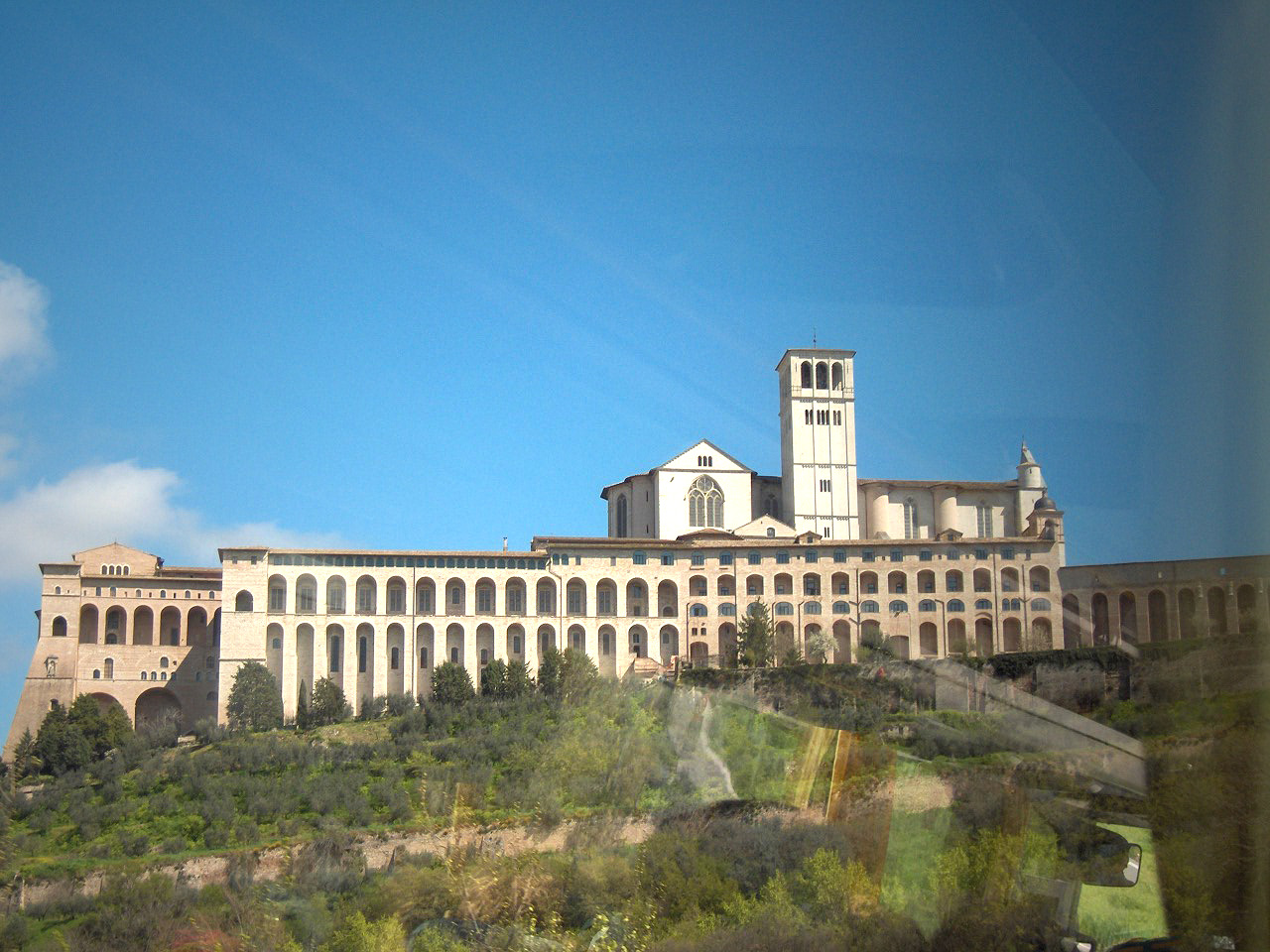
Basilica and monastery.

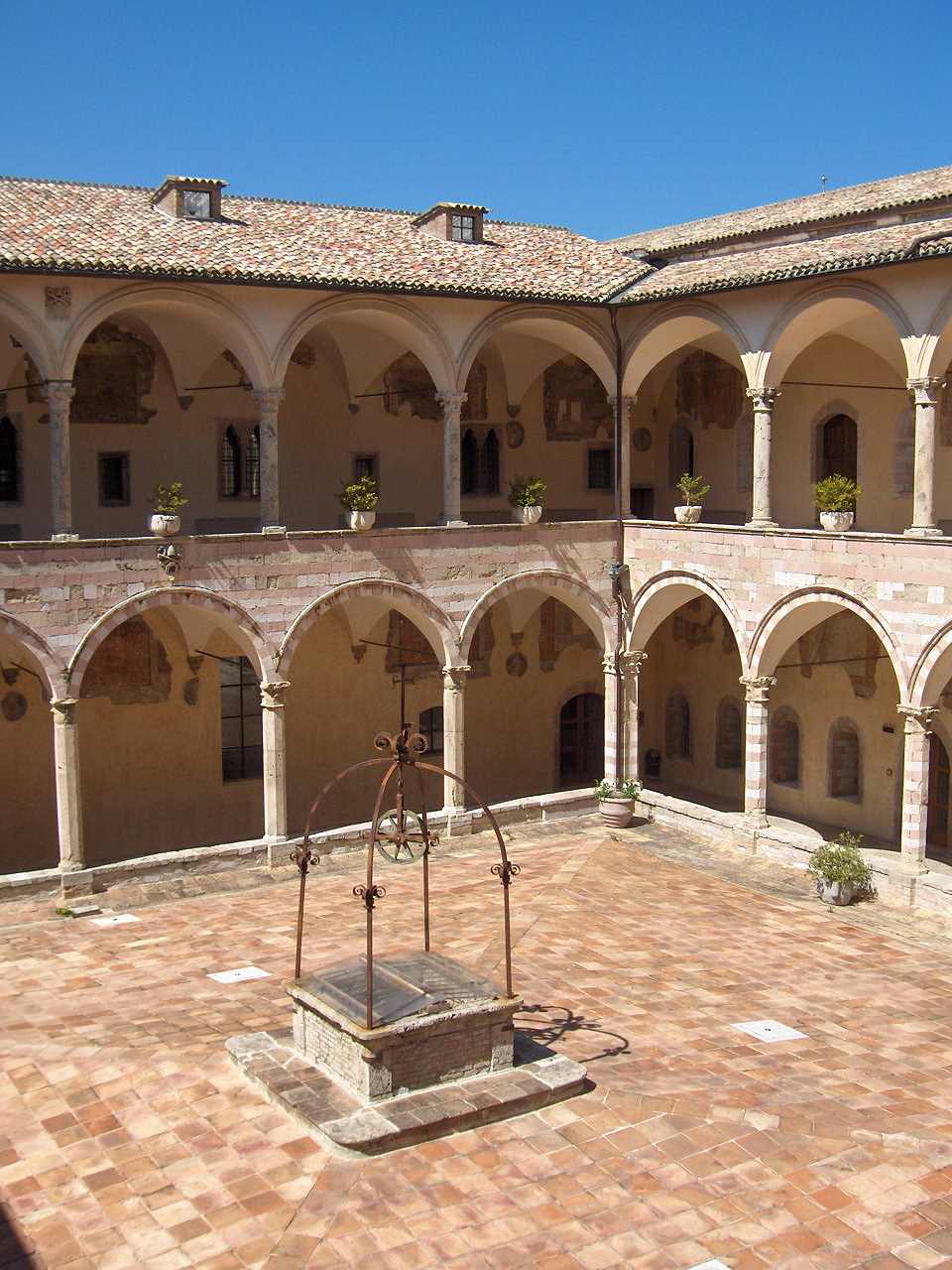
Courtyard of the friary.

The Sacro Convento is a Franciscan friary in Assisi, Umbria, Italy. The friary is connected as part of three buildings to the upper and lower church of the Basilica of San Francesco d'Assisi, which contains the body of Saint Francis. St. Francis wanted to be buried at this location outside of Assisi's city walls, called Hill of Hell (Collo d'Inferno - here were the gallows where criminals were put to death), because our master Jesus of Nazareth also was killed like a criminal outside of the city of Jerusalem.

== Description ==
The Conventual Franciscans consider Assisi as the mother town and the monastery as spiritual centre of their order, while the operational centre is located in Rome.

Pope Gregory IX laid the cornerstone for the Basilica of San Francesco d'Assisi and the friary on 17 July 1228, the day after the canonization of Saint Francis. In 1230, after two years the lower church was ready to uptake the bones of Saint Francis, who had died at Portiuncula in 1226, and had been transferred to the church San Gregorio, which later became the Basilica di Santa Chiara, after Santa Chiara's death.

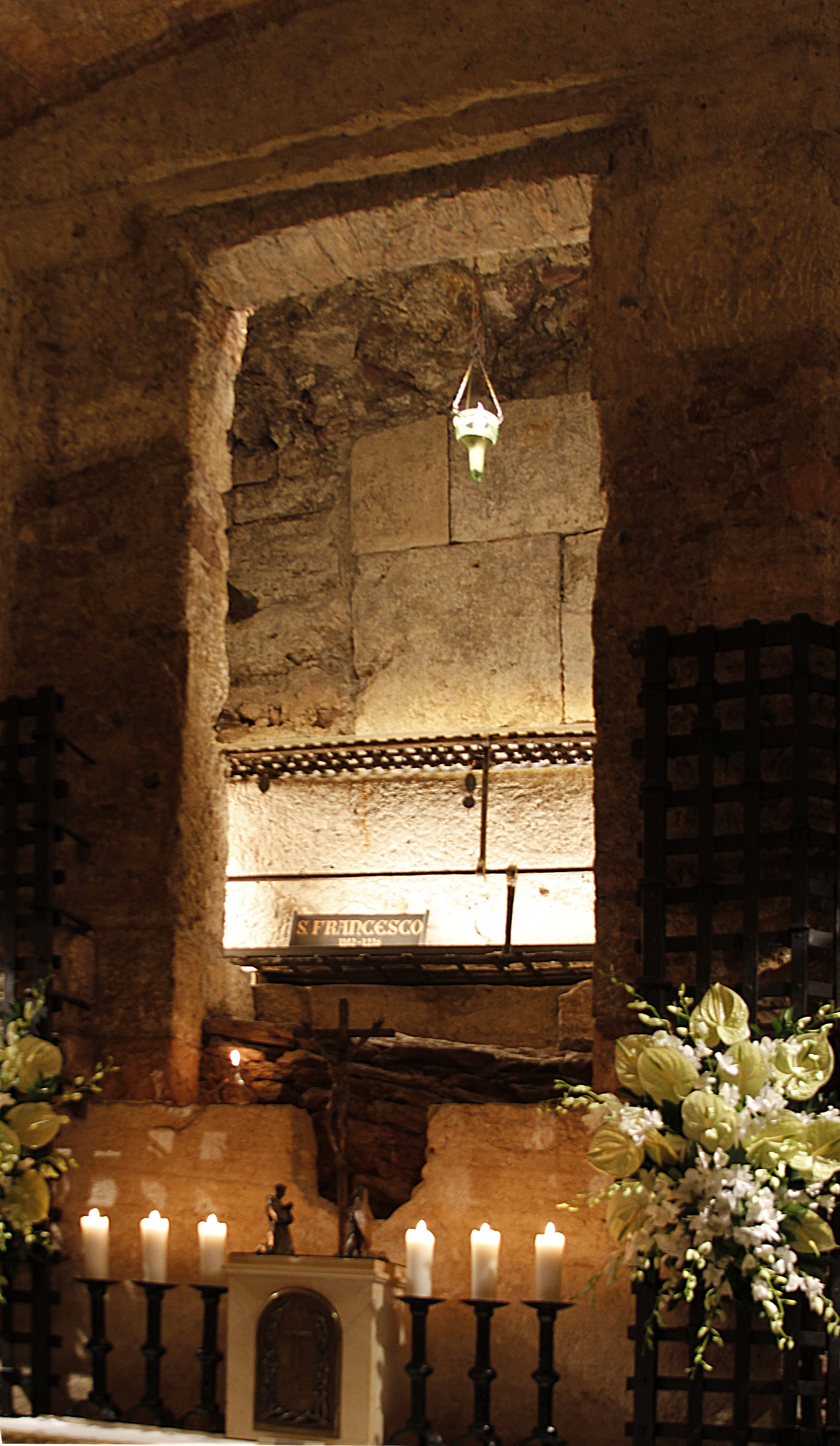
Grave of Saint Francis in the Crypt of the Basilica of San Francesco d'Assisi

Historians generally agree that the complex with church and monastery was completed with 11 years, by 1239. The original part of the Sacro Convento (built under the leadership of Brother Elias) consisted of a refectory, dormitory, chapter hall, papal hall and a scriptorium-library. For the first 200 years of its existence, the library rivaled the Sorbonne and Avignon with a comparable number of manuscripts.

In the 15th century, during the reign of Pope Sixtus IV, the Sacro Convento was extensively enlarged and used as a summer residence of the popes.

In the 17th century, the kings of Spain endowed the Sacro Convento with a larger hospice so that the friars could better provide for the many infirm pilgrims.

In 1971, a theological institute accredited by the Lateran was established to meet the academic needs of international students from all three branches of the First Order, the TOR's, several Franciscan sister communities and the Benedictines. It also became the theological training centre for diocesan seminarians, as well as for lay women and men seeking advanced degrees in Religious Studies.

In February 2024, the Sacro Convento hosted a symposium discussing the papal encyclical Laudato si'.
