= Archdiocese of Chieti-Vasto =

Roman Catholic archdiocese in Italy

Metropolitan Archdiocese of Chieti-Vasto Archidioecesis Metropolitae Theatina-Vastensis Arcidiocesi Metropolitana di Chieti-Vasto Arcidiocesi Metropolitana'e Chiete-Vasto

Catholic
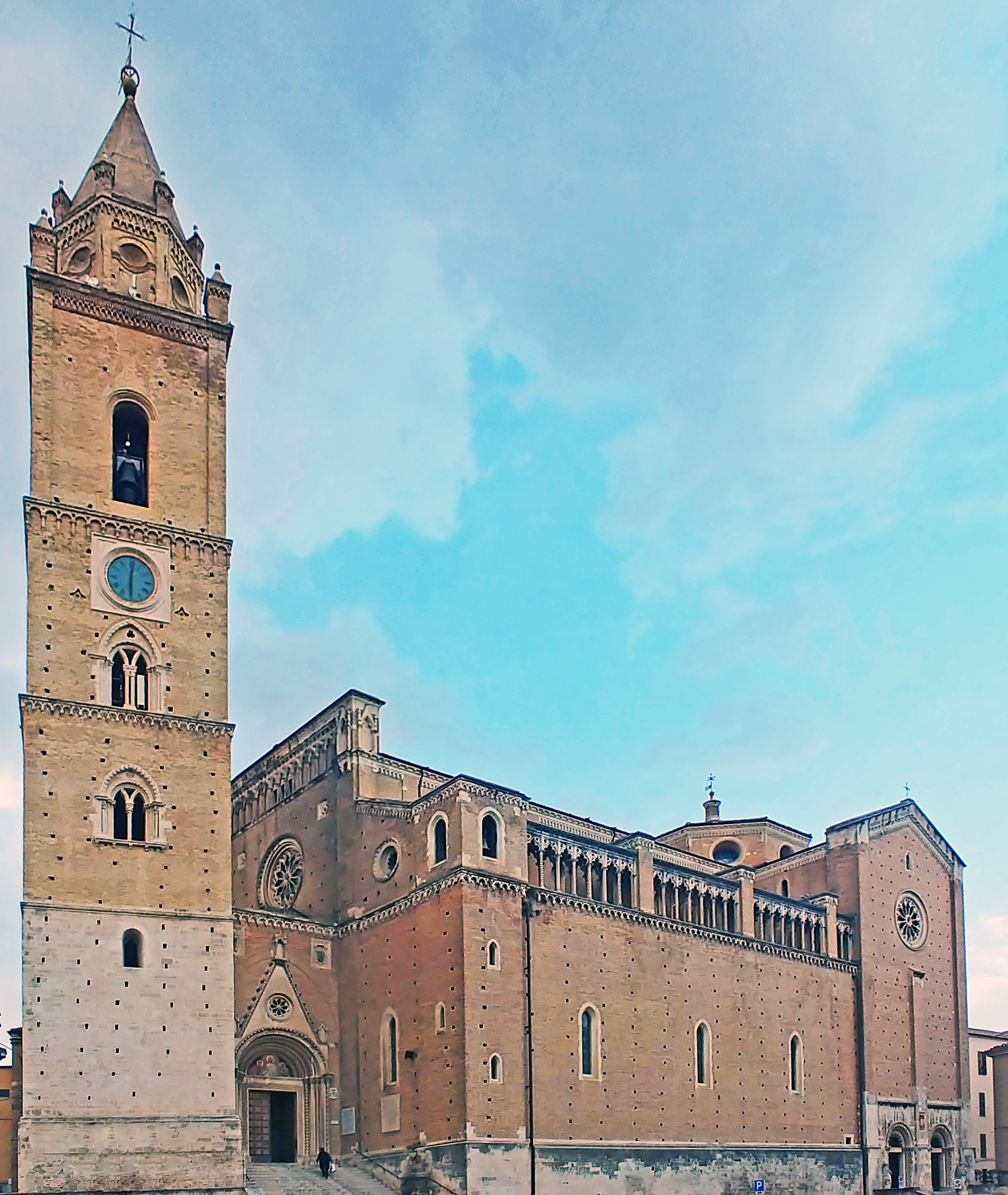
- Chieti Cathedral

Location
- Country: Italy
- Ecclesiastical province: Chieti-Vasto

Statistics
- Area: 2,539 km^{2} (980 sq mi)
- Population: Total; Catholics: (as of 2023); 307,673 ▼; 279,500 ▼ (90.8 ▼%)
- Parishes: 146 ▲

Information
- Denomination: Catholic Church
- Rite: Roman Rite
- Established: 6th Century
- Cathedral: Chieti Cathedral (Cattedrale di S. Giustino)
- Co-cathedral: Vasto Cathedral (Concattedrale di S. Giuseppe)
- Secular priests: 127 (diocesan) ▼51 (religious orders) ▼21 Permanent Deacons ▼

Current leadership
- Pope: Leo XIV
- Bishop-Elect: Mauro Maria Gambetti
- Bishops emeritus: Bruno Forte

Map
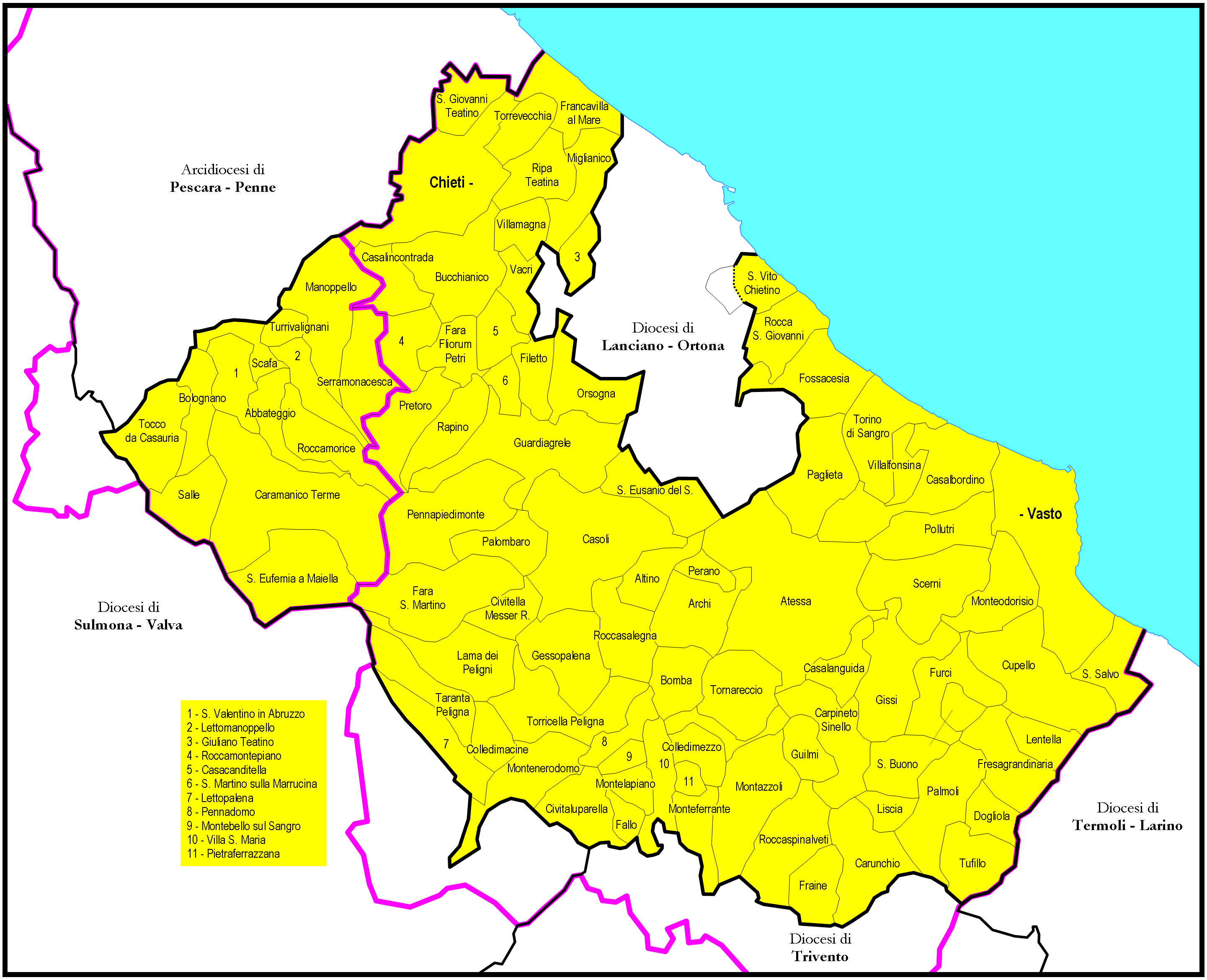

Website
- Arcidiocesi di Chieti-Vasto (in Italian)

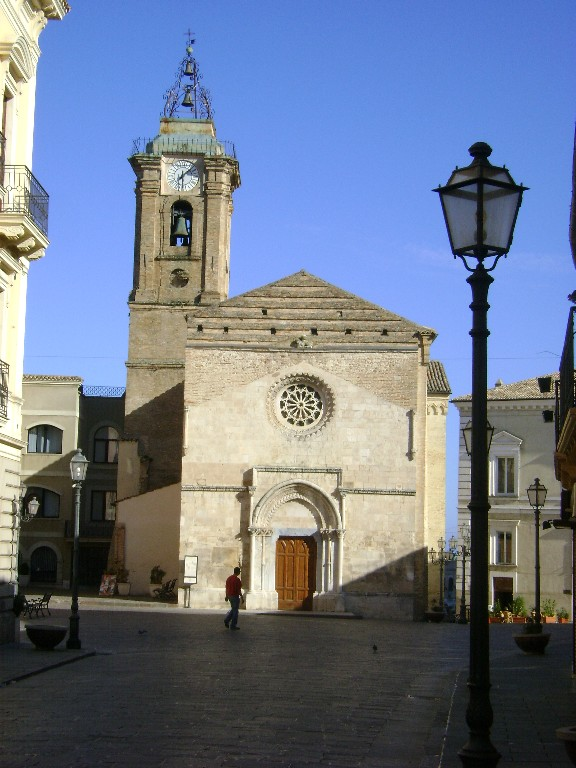
Vasto Cathedral

The Metropolitan Archdiocese of Chieti-Vasto (Latin: Archidioecesis Metropolitae Theatina-Vastensis; Italian: Arcidiocesi Metropolitana di Chieti-Vasto; Neapolitan: Arcidiocesi Metropolitana'e Chiete-Vasto'e Chiete-Vasto) is a Latin Church diocese of the Catholic Church which received that name in 1986, when the two separate dioceses, which had been governed by one and the same bishop, were united in one diocese. The diocese of Chieti had become the Metropolitan Archdiocese of Chieti in 1526, when promoted by Pope Clement VII. Chieti is about 8 miles (14 km) south-west of the Adriatic port city of Pescara.

== History ==
Chieti is the ancient Teate. In the Gothic War it was captured by Totila; later it fell into the hands of the Lombards, from whom it was captured by Pepin and devastated. The first record of Chieti as a county occurs in 872; it was subject to the dukes of Spoleto until 967. In 1065, Geoffrey d'Hauteville, Count of the Capitanata and the brother of Robert Guiscard, conquered the county of Chieti. His son, Roberto di Loritello, completed the conquest as far as Ortona, thereby bringing the excommunication of Pope Gregory VII on him as a usurper of papal property. The Normans rebuilt the city of Chieti, which thenceforth belonged to the Kingdom of the Two Sicilies.

=== Early episcopal claims ===
Justin of Chieti, who is said to have presided over the Church of Chieti in the time of Pope Silvester I (314–335) is venerated as the first Bishop of Chieti, and the cathedral is dedicated to him. His story, however, is untrustworthy. The bishops between Justinus and Quintus have all been rejected as modern forgeries. The bishop Quintus who was present at the Roman synod of 499 was bishop of Teanum in Campania, not Teate (Chieti) in the Abruzzi. Quintus' alleged successor (c. 594) was a certain Barbarus, or Barbatus, or Joannes, who was appointed apostolic visitor of the Church of Ortona; there is no indication of Barbarus' diocese. Cappelletti posits a Saint Ceteus of Chieti, of date unknown, but Lanzoni points out that Saint Celeus was bishop of Amiternum. A bishop Gribaldus (874), whose labelled image appears on the late 12th century bronze doors of the Abbey of San Clemente a Casauria, is claimed as a bishop of Chieti.

Bishop Theoderic held a diocesan synod in May 840, in which he established a Canonicate in which the priests who served the cathedral of S. Justinus should live and pray together. He was probably responding to imperial and papal wishes.

=== Western schism ===
The diocese of Chieti was always directly subject to the papacy, without an intervening archbishop.

At the beginning of the Western Schism, in 1378, Bishop Eleazarius de Sabrano chose to support Urban VI, and was one of the twenty-five prelates named cardinals by Urban on 18 September 1378. He was assigned the position of Major Penitentiary. He left behind in Chieti his Vicar General, Clemente Dicivano, who became a target of Urban VI's opponent in the schism, Clement VII (Robert of Geneva). Clement wrote a letter to Queen Joanna I of Naples, informing her that some of the clergy of Chieti, led by the Vicar General, were engaged in active physical resistance against his agents, who were attempting to install bishop-elect Tommaso Brancaccio. He issued a mandate to Queen Joanna, ordering her to have her officials arrest the offenders, whatever their status or position. Joanna supported Clement VII until a revolution led by Charles of Durazzo deposed her on 25 August 1381, and had her murdered on 27 July 1382. Urban VI wrote a letter to the people of Chieti in November 1381, in favor of Charles, and declaring Joanna deposed and excommunicated.

Bishop Giovanni Pietro Carafa in 1524 resigned the see of Chieti, and, along with Cajetan of Tiene, founded the Theatine Order. Carafa was elected pope on 23 May 1555, and took the name Paul IV.

=== Metropolitan archdiocese ===
On 1 June 1526, Pope Clement VII issued the bull Super Universas, by which he elevated the diocese of Chieti to the status of metropolitan archdiocese, and its bishop to the rank of metropolitan archbishop. The dioceses of Lanciano, Penne, and Atri were assigned as its suffragans (subordinates). There was apparently discontent in Lanciano, since the pope had to write again, in the bull Dudum Cum Nobis of 17 February 1534. To strengthen his previous decisions, and to support his relative, Archbishop Guido de'Medici, the Archbishop of Chieti, who was actually serving as Castellan (praefectus) of the Castel S. Angelo (1525–1534), Pope Clement again declared that Lanciano was a suffragan of the archdiocese of Chieti in the ecclesiastical province of Chieti. The Bishop of Penne ed Atri, Valentino Cantalice, also protested to Pope Clement, against his diocese being a suffragan of any metropolitan other than the pope. Until his death in 1534, Clement refused Cantalice's plea. The attitude of his successor, Pope Paul III (Farnese), remained the same, until, on 4 November 1538, the pope's great-grandson, Ottavio Farnese, married the illegitimate daughter of the Emperor Charles V, Margherita of Parma, Duchess of Penne. With their support, Pope Paul issued the bull "Inter Caetera" on 18 July 1539, reversing the arrangement of Clement VII and making the diocese of Penne ed Atri again directly dependent upon the Holy See.

The bishops of Lanciano also caused problems, in continuing struggles with the archbishops of Chieti over obligations and privileges. Finally, Pope Pius IV intervened, and, in a bull of 26 February 1562, promoted Lanciano to the status of an archdiocese, directly dependent upon the Holy See.

In 1818, when a general reorganization of the dioceses of the Kingdom of the Two Sicilies took place, the archdiocese of Chieti had no suffragan dioceses.

On 20 May 1853, Pope Pius IX issued the consistorial decree "Adeo late dioecesanum Teatini," which separated the territory of Vasto from the archdiocese of Chieti, and created the separate diocese of Vasto; at the request of King Ferdinando II of the Two Sicilies, the pope made the new diocese of Vasto dependent upon the archdiocese of Chieti, with a vicar-general of the archbishop resident in Vasto. The archbishop was therefore perpetual administrator of Vasto.

=== Modern configuration ===
In 1949, as part of the changes that led to the creation of the diocese of Pescara e Penne, the diocese of Chieti lost five parishes to the diocese of Penne.

On 2 March 1982, Pope John Paul II issued the bull, Fructuosae Ecclesiae, in which he created the new ecclesiastical province of Chieti (Theatina), granting it as suffragan dioceses Vasto, Lanciano and Ortona. The metropolitan status of Lanciano was cancelled, though its archbishop was permitted to retain the title of archbishop. The diocese of Ortona was joined to the archdiocese of Lanciano, aeque principaliter.

The archdiocese, in its current configuration, was established in order to conform to Italian civil law which was embodied in the Concordat between the Vatican and the Italian Republic of 18 February 1984. After extensive consultations, Pope John Paul II decreed that the status of one bishop governing several dioceses aeque personaliter, as was the case with Chieti e Vasto, was abolished; and that the diocese of Vasto was therefore merged with the Archdiocese of Chieti to form a single diocese. The changes were embodied in a decree of the Sacred Congregation of Bishops in the Roman Curia, promulgated on 30 September 1986. The seat of the merged dioceses was to be in Chieti, and the official name of the diocese was to be "Archidioecesis Theatina-Vastensis". The diocesan offices (curia) was to be in Chieti, as was the diocesan tribunal, the diocesan seminary, the College of Consultors, and the Priests' Council, unless otherwise directed by the bishop.

== Bishops and Archbishops ==
=== to 1192 ===
- Theodoric (attested 840)
- Lupo I (c. 844)
- Pietro I (c. 853)
- Theodoric (attested 879–888)
- Atinolfus (c. 904)
- Rimo (d. 964)
- Liudinus (attested 972–1008)

[Lupus (c. 1008)]

- Arnolfus (attested 1049)
- Atto (1057–1073)
- Teuzo (attested 1073/1074)
- Rainulfus (attested 1086–1105)
- Rogerius (attested 1107)
- Albericus (attested 1110–1112)
- Wilielmus (attested 1111–1117)
- [Andreas (1118)]
- Gerardus (1118–1125)
- Attone II (1125–1137)
- Rustico (1137–1140)
- Alanno (1140–1150)
- Andrea II (1150–1190)
- Pietro II (1191)

=== From 1192 to 1524 ===
- Bartholomeus (1192–1227)
- Rainaldus (c. 1227–1234)
- Gregorio di Poli (1234– ? )
- Landolfo Caracciolo (1252–1253)
- Alessandro di Capua (1254–1262)
- Nicola da Fossa, O.Cist. (1262–1282)
- Tommaso (1282–1294)

[Guglielmo (1292–1293)]

- Rainaldo, O.P. (1295–1303)
- Matthias (1303) Bishop-elect
- Pietro (1303–1320)
- Raimondo de Mausaco, O.Min. (1321–1326)
- Giovanni Crispano de Rocca (1326–1336)
- Pietro Ferri (1336)
- Beltramino Paravicini (1336–1339)
- Guglielmo Capoferro (1340–1352)
- Bartolomeo Papazzurri, O.P. (1353–1362)
- Vitale da Bologna, O.S.M. (1363–1373)
- Eleazario da Sabrano (1373–1378)
- Thomas Brancaccio (1378–1381) Avignon Obedience
- Giovanni de Comina, O.Coel. (1378–1396) Roman Obedience
- Guglielmo Carbone (1396–1418) Roman Obedience
- Nicola Viviani (1419–1428)
- Marino de Tocco (1429–1438)
- Giovanni Battista de Bruna (1438–1445) Bishop-elect
- Colantonio Valignani (1445–1488)
- Alfonso d'Aragona (1488–1496) Bishop-elect
- Giacomo de Bacio (1496–1499 ?)

Oliviero Carafa (1500–1501) Administrator

- Bernardino Carafa (1501–1505)
- Gian Pietro Carafa (1505–1518)
- Gian Pietro Carafa (1518–1524) Administrator

=== Metropolitan Archbishops, from 1524 to 1821 ===
- Felice Trofino (1524–1527)
- Guido de' Medici (1528–1537)
- Gian Pietro Carafa (1537–1549)
- Bernardino Maffei (1549–1553)
- Marcantonio Maffei (1553–1568)
- Giovanni Oliva (1568–1577)
- Girolamo Leoni (1577–1578)
- Cesare Busdragus (1578–1585)
- Giovanni Battista Castrucci (1585–1591)
- Orazio Sanminiato (1591–1592)
- Matteo Sanminiato (1592–1607)
- Anselmo Marzato, O.F.M.Cap. (1607)
- Orazio Maffei (1607–1609)
- Ulpiano Volpi (1609–1615)
- Paolo Tolosa, C.R. (1616-1618)
- Marsilio Peruzzi (1618–1631)
- Antonio Santacroce (1631–1636)
- Stefano Sauli (1638–1649)
- Vincenzo Rabatta (1649–1653)
- Angelo Maria Ciria, O.S.M. (1654–1656)
- Modesto Gavazzi, O.F.M.Conv. (1657)
- Niccolò Radulovich (1659–1702)
- Vincenzo Capece (1703–1722)
- Filippo Valignani, O.P. (1722–1737)
- Michele Palma (1737–1755)
- Nicola Sanchez De Luna (1755–1764)
- Francesco Brancia (1765–1770)
- Luigi del Giudice, O.S.B.Coel. (1770–1790)
- Andrea Mirelli, O.S.B. (1792–1795)
- Francesco Saverio Bassi, O.S.B.Coel. (1797–1821)

=== Metropolitan Archbishops since 1821 ===
- Carlo Maria Cernelli (1822–1838)
- Giosuè Maria Saggese, C.SS.R. (1838–1852)
- Michele Manzo (1852–1856)
- Luigi Maria de Marinis (1856–1877)
- Fulco Luigi Ruffo-Scilla (1877–1887)
- Rocco Cocchia, O.F.M. Cap. (1887–1901)
- Gennaro Costagliola, C.M. (1901–1919)
- Nicola Monterisi (1919–1929), then archbishop of Salerno
- Giuseppe Venturi (1931–1947)
- Giovanni Battista Bosio (1948–1967)
- Loris Francesco Capovilla (1967–1971)
- Vincenzo Fagiolo (1971–1984)
- Antonio Valentini (1984–1993)
- Edoardo Menichelli (1994–2004), then archbishop of Ancona-Osimo
- Bruno Forte (2004-2026)
- Mauro Gambetti (2026-)

== See also ==
- Roman Catholic Archdiocese of Lanciano-Ortona
- Roman Catholic Archdiocese of Pescara-Penne
- Roman Catholic Diocese of Atri
- List of Catholic dioceses in Italy

== Sources ==
=== Episcopal lists ===
- Eubel, Conradus, ed. (1913). Hierarchia catholica (in Latin). Vol. I (second ed.). Münster: Libreria Regensbergiana.
- Eubel, Conradus, ed. (1914). Hierarchia catholica (in Latin). Vol. II (second ed.). Münster: Libreria Regensbergiana.
- Eubel, Conradus; Gulik, Guilelmus (1923). Hierarchia catholica (in Latin). Vol. III (second ed.). Münster: Libreria Regensbergiana.
- Gams, Pius Bonifatius (1873). Series episcoporum Ecclesiae catholicae: quotquot innotuerunt a beato Petro apostolo (in Latin). Ratisbon: Typis et Sumptibus Georgii Josephi Manz. pp. 875–876.
- Gauchat, Patritius (Patrice) (1935). Hierarchia catholica (in Latin). Vol. IV (1592-1667). Münster: Libraria Regensbergiana.
- Ritzler, Remigius; Sefrin, Pirminus (1952). Hierarchia catholica medii et recentis aevi (in Latin). Vol. V (1667-1730). Patavii: Messagero di S. Antonio.
- Ritzler, Remigius; Sefrin, Pirminus (1958). Hierarchia catholica medii et recentis aevi (in Latin). Vol. VI (1730-1799). Patavii: Messagero di S. Antonio.
- Ritzler, Remigius; Sefrin, Pirminus (1968). Hierarchia Catholica medii et recentioris aevi (in Latin). Vol. VII (1800–1846). Monasterii: Libreria Regensburgiana.
- Remigius Ritzler; Pirminus Sefrin (1978). Hierarchia catholica Medii et recentioris aevi (in Latin). Vol. VIII (1846–1903). Il Messaggero di S. Antonio.
- Pięta, Zenon (2002). Hierarchia catholica medii et recentioris aevi (in Latin). Vol. IX (1903–1922). Padua: Messagero di San Antonio. ISBN 978-88-250-1000-8.

=== Studies ===
- Cappelletti, Giuseppe (1870). Le chiese d'Italia dalla loro origine sino ai nostri giorni (in Italian). Vol. vigesimoprimo (21). Venezia: Antonelli. pp. 95–109.
- D'Avino, Vincenzio (1848). Cenni storici sulle chiese arcivescovili, vescovili, e prelatizie (nullius) del regno delle due Sicilie (in Italian). Naples: dalle stampe di Ranucci. pp. 198–219. [article written by Giosuè Maria Saggese]
- De Laurentiis, G., "II gastaldato e la contea di Teate con la serie de' suoi conti," (in Italian), in: Bollettino della Società di storia patria Anton Ludovico Antinori negli Abruzzi Vol. XIV (Aquila 1902), pp. 211–235. XV (1903) pp. 211–235. XVI (1904), pp. 1–37; 105-137; 231-238.
- Kehr, Paul Fridolin (1909). Italia pontificia Vol. IV (Berlin: Weidmann 1909), pp. 267–282. (in Latin)
- Lanzoni, Francesco (1927). Le diocesi d'Italia dalle origini al principio del secolo VII (an. 604). Faenza: F. Lega. (in Italian)
- Ravizza, Gennaro (1830). Memorie istoriche intorno la serie de' vescovi ed arcivescovi teatini. (in Italian). Napoli: Miranda, 1830.
- Ravizza, Gennaro (1836). Collezione di diplomi e di altri documenti de'tempi di mezzo e recenti da servire alla storia della città di Chieti: Opera postuma pubblicata d. Andrea Ravizza (in Italian). Napoli: Miranda, 1836. Vol. I. Vol. II. Vol. III. Vol. IV.
- Schwartz, Gerhard (1907). Die Besetzung der Bistümer Reichsitaliens unter den sächsischen und salischen Kaisern: mit den Listen der Bischöfe, 951-1122. (in German). Leipzig: B.G. Teubner. pp. 230–231.
- Ughelli, Ferdinando; Coleti, Niccolo (1720). Italia sacra sive De episcopis Italiæ, et insularum adjacentium (in Latin). Vol. Tomus sextus (6). Venice: apud Sebastianum Coleti. pp. 667–772.
