= Uberto Gambara =

Italian Roman Catholic bishop and cardinal

His Eminence Uberto Gambara
- Bishop of Tortona
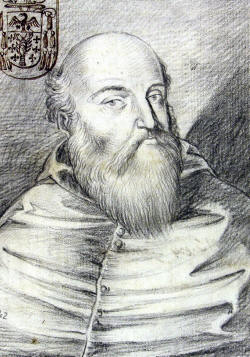
- Church: Catholic Church
- See: Bishop of Tortona
- Appointed: 8 May 1528
- Term ended: 22 March 1548
- Predecessor: Gian Domenico de Zazi
- Successor: Cesare Gambara

Orders
- Consecration: February 1533 (Bishop) by Giovanni Matteo Giberti
- Created cardinal: 19 December 1539 by Pope Paul III

Personal details
- Born: 23 January 1489 Brescia, Republic of Venice
- Died: 14 February 1549 (aged 60) Roma

Uberto Gambara (1489–1549) was an Italian Roman Catholic bishop of Tortona and cardinal. He was served the popes as nuncio in Portugal and later in England at the court of Henry VIII of England.

== Biography ==
Uberto Gambara was born in Brescia on 23 January 1489, the son of Gianfrancesco Gambara and Alda Pio di Carpi. Veronica Gambara was his sister. When he was 10 years old, he was destined for a career in the church. He was named provost of Verolanuova and chaplain of San Giacomo in 1502. He briefly left the ecclesiastical state, fighting alongside his brother Brunoro in the French army of Gaston of Foix, Duke of Nemours then invading Brescia.

He then reentered the ecclesiastical estate, traveling to Rome during the pontificate of Pope Leo X. The pope named him nuncio to the Kingdom of Portugal, a post he would continue to occupy during the papacies of Pope Adrian VI and Pope Clement VII. The latter pope then named him nuncio to the court of Francis I of France. In 1527, he became nuncio to the Kingdom of England. There, he coordinated with the papal legate to England, Cardinal Thomas Wolsey, Archbishop of York. On 15 December 1527 he carried Cardinal Wolsey's letter to Pope Clement VII in which Wolsey secretly expressed his wish to be granted special powers allowing him to annul the marriage of Henry VIII of England and Catherine of Aragon, thus allowing the king to marry Anne Boleyn.

Pope Clement VII was imprisoned by imperial troops following the Sack of Rome (1527). During this period, Gambara traveled to Paris to attempt to raise military assistance to free the pontiff.

On 8 May 1528 he was elected bishop of Tortona, coinciding with the pope naming him governor of Bologna, holding this post until 1533. He was present at the imperial coronation of Charles V, Holy Roman Emperor in Bologna on 24 February 1530. At the end of his governorship, he was finally consecrated as a bishop in February 1533 in Bologna by Gian Matteo Giberti, Bishop of Verona.

== Cardinal ==
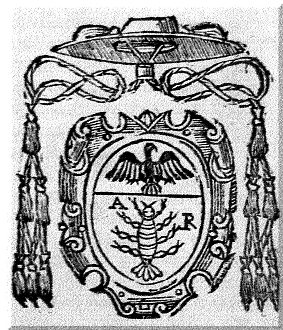
Coat of arms of Cardinal Uberto Gambara

In 1539, Pope Paul III made him vicar of Rome. He then made him a cardinal priest in the consistory of 19 December 1539. He received the red hat and the titular church of San Silvestro in Capite on 28 January 1540. He opted for the titular church of San Martino ai Monti on 23 March 1541. On 9 January 1542 he was named administrator of the see of Policastro, resigning that administration on 7 June 1543.

He was the papal legate in Parma and Piacenza from 27 January 1542 until 5 March 1544. He opted for the titular church of Sant'Apollinare alle Terme Neroniane-Alessandrine on 15 February 1542 and then for San Crisogono on 17 October 1544.

He was the Camerlengo of the Sacred College of Cardinals from 9 January 1545 to 8 January 1546. He was then sent to France, returning to Rome on 16 December 1547. On 22 March 1548 he resigned the government of the see of Tortona in favor of his nephew, Cesare Gambara. He then traveled to Genoa, returning to Rome on 5 January 1549.

He died in Rome on 14 February 1549. His remains were returned to Brescia and he was buried in Santa Maria delle Grazie.
