= Madonna and Child with Saint Roch and Saint Sebastian (Lotto) =

c. 1518 painting by Lorenzo Lotto

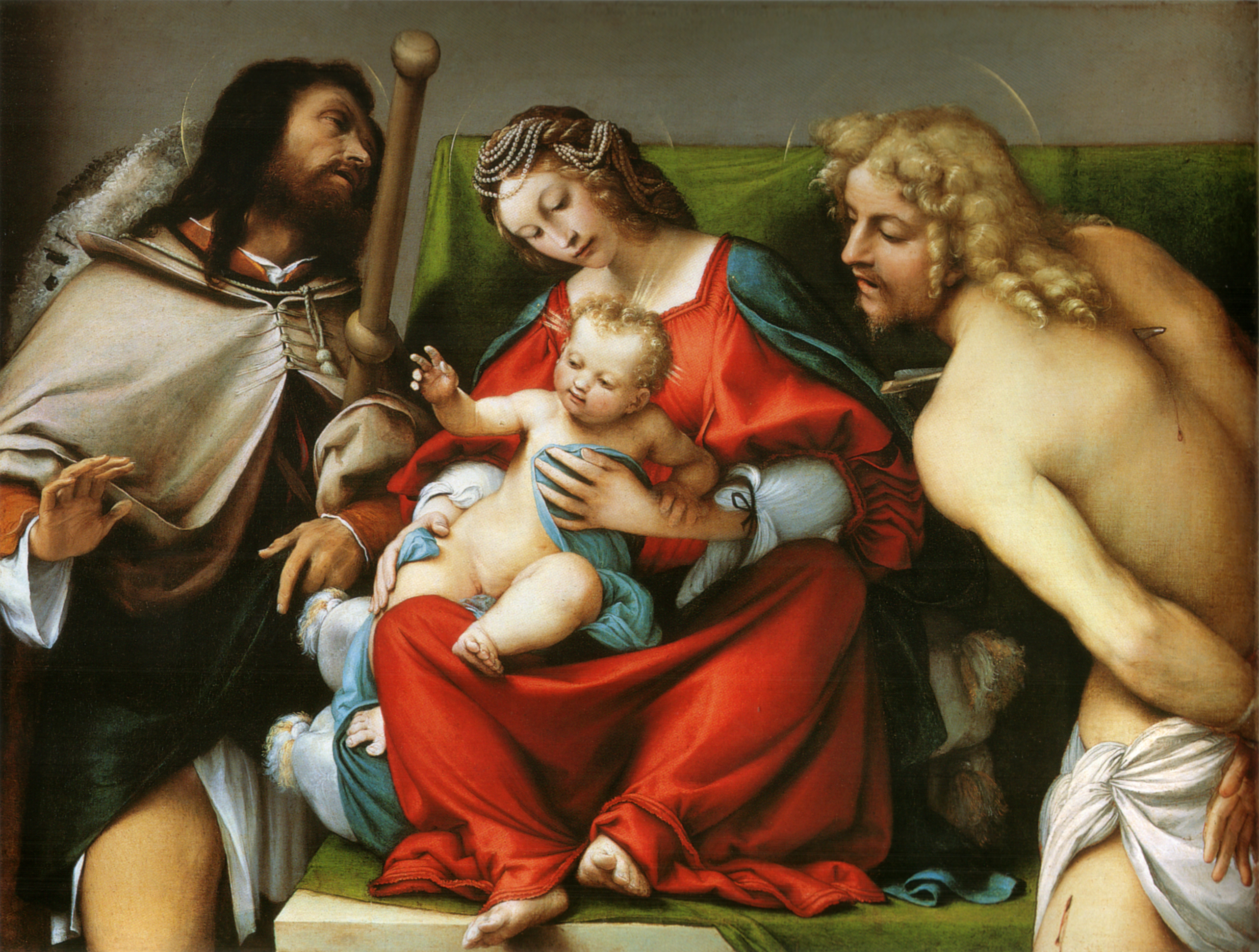
- Artist: Lorenzo Lotto
- Year: c. 1518
- Medium: Oil on canvas
- Dimensions: 81.8 cm × 108.5 cm (32.2 in × 42.7 in)
- Location: National Gallery of Canada; Ottawa

Madonna and Child with Saint Roch and Saint Sebastian is an oil-on-canvas painting by the Italian Renaissance artist Lorenzo Lotto, created c. 1518, now in the National Gallery of Canada, in Ottawa. On the left is Saint Roch and to the right is Saint Sebastian.

== History ==
It was commissioned by Lotto's friend Battista Cucchi, one of several surgeons active in Bergamo and nicknamed 'Battista degli Organi' (Battista of the Organs). In his will of 1533 he left it to Lucrezia de Tirabuschis (Tiraboschi), a nun in the convent of Santa Grata on via Arena, where it remained until 1798. It was mentioned in Carlo Ridolfi's Le Meraviglie dell'Arte (1648), by Donato Calvi in Effemeride sagro profana di quanto di memorabile sia successo in Bergamo and by Francesco Tassi.

The convent was under threat of closure in the late 18th century and feared having the painting confiscated when it was suppressed. It therefore sold the work in 1798 at a low price to abbot Giovanni Ghidini, who did not catalogue it. His great-grandson Nicola Ghidini gave it to the Piccinelli collection in Seriate in 1864. Ercole Piccinelli later sold it to Alessandro Contini Bonacossi for 180,000 lire. Contini's heirs offered it to the Uffizi, but when it was refused sold it instead to its present owners in 1976.

== Description ==
The work apparently has a typical devotional scheme, with the half-figure characters lined up in a horizontal long shot, the Madonna and Child in the center and two saints at the sides, on a model widely used in Venice by Giovanni Bellini and others. In this case, however, Mary is misaligned, sitting on a throne of bare stone, covered only by a green cloth, where she must also rest her legs, on the model of the Madonnas of Humility, and is flanked by the saints Roch and Sebastian, (protectors from plagues) who instead stand, on a lower level, and with a complementary three-quarter rotation of the torso (frontal and dorsal). Roch shows the wound in his thigh, which is miraculously healed by the Child's blessing gesture, while Sebastian twists forward to see the miracle, with an astonished expression.

The construction of the composition has an exquisitely proto-mannerist flavour, with the use of diagonal lines and a substantial lack of interest in perspective (the proportions in fact do not always match, but rather seem to vary to highlight the lateral saints).

The light is soft and enveloping, the application gives a silky effect, as in Sebastian's blonde hair, or woolly, as in Roch's hat, tied behind the shoulders. The concert of bright colors is extraordinary, highlighted by the gray background, and which has its culmination in the intense red of Mary's dress.
