= Modesto Gavazzi (archbishop of Chieti) =

Italian Roman Catholic prelate (died 1657)

Most Reverend Modesto Gavazzi
- Archbishop of Chieti
- Church: Catholic Church
- Archdiocese: Archdiocese of Chieti
- In office: 1657
- Predecessor: Angelo Maria Ciria Panvini
- Successor: Niccolò Radulovich

Personal details
- Died: 6 March 1657

Modesto Gavazzi, O.F.M. Conv. (died 1657) was a Roman Catholic prelate who served as Archbishop of Chieti (1657).

== Biography ==
Modesto Gavazzi was ordained a priest in the Order of Friars Minor Conventual. On 19 Feb 1657, he was appointed during the papacy of Pope Alexander VII as Archbishop of Chieti. He died soon after on 6 Mar 1657, a claim which is contradicted by the grant of the pallium to him on 12 March 1657.

Modesto Gavazzi was scholastic philosopher and a close friend and colleague of the better-known Scotists Bonaventura Belluto (1600–76) and Bartholomew Mastrius.

Catholic Church titles
Preceded by Angelo Maria Ciria Panvini	Archbishop of Chieti; 1657	Succeeded by Niccolò Radulovich
