= Madonna and Child with Saint Roch and Saint Sebastian (Moretto) =

c. 1528 painting by Moretto da Brescia

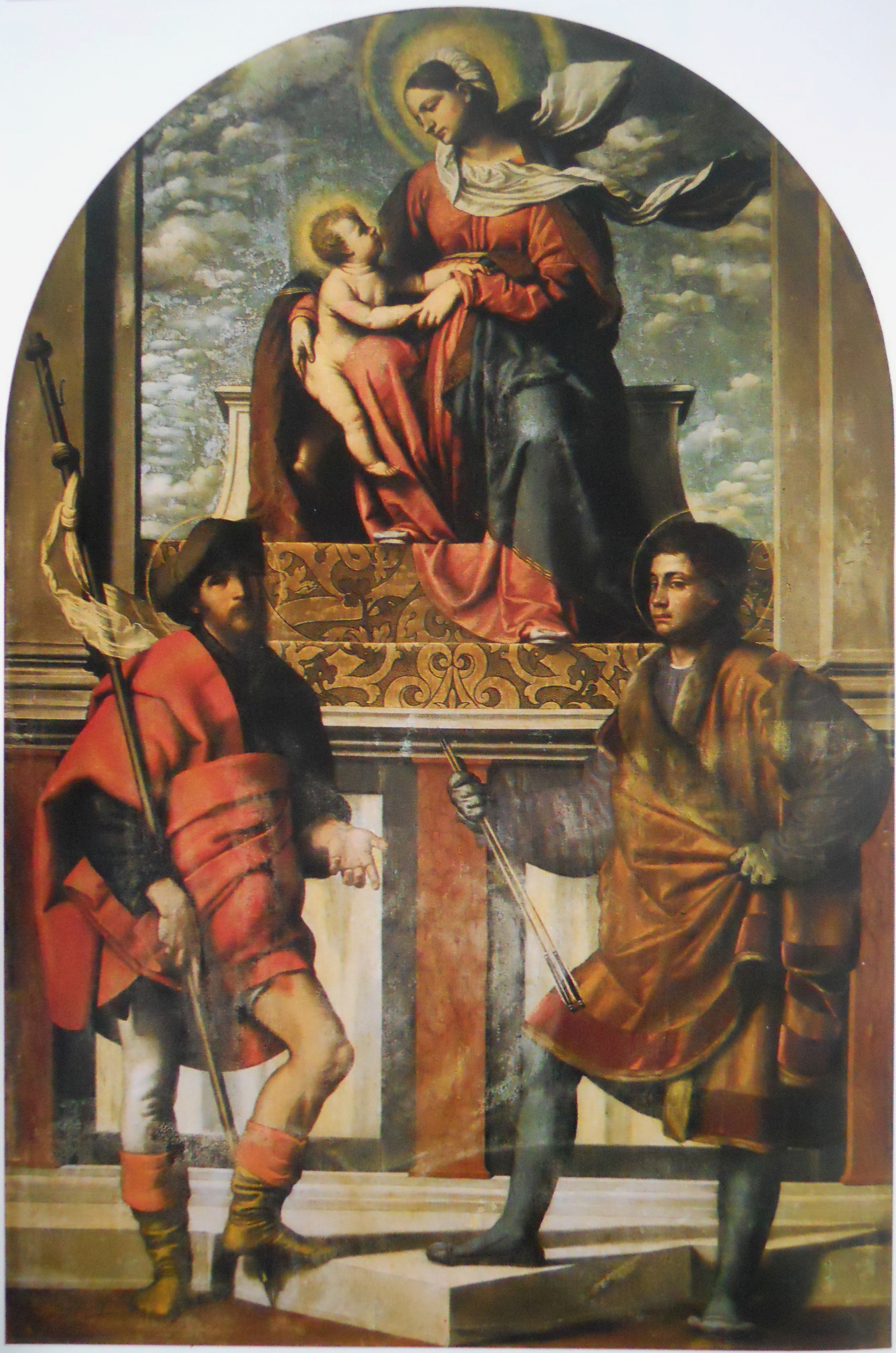
Madonna and Child with Saint Roch and Saint Sebastian (c. 1528) by Moretto da Brescia

Madonna and Child with Saint Roch and Saint Sebastian is an oil on canvas painting on one of the side altars of the church of Sant'Andrea in Pralboino, province of Brescia, Italy. It was executed c. 1528 by Moretto da Brescia.

For its control and composition, the painting marks the beginning of the mature period of Moretto's artistic career. The figures are ably realized, and the light on their clothes and the background architecture is well-used.

== History ==
The painting was originally commissioned for the church of San Rocco in the town of Pralboino, where it was seen by Francesco Paglia in 1660. There is no further mention of it in records until the 19th century, when it appears in studies by Carl Ransonnet in 1845 and by Stefano Fenaroli in 1875. By then, the painting had been moved into the church of Sant'Andrea - it had probably been moved between 1782 and 1790 when the parish church was rebuilt in its present form. The work is still stored there, on one of the altars to the left of the nave.

== Description ==
The canvas is divided into two levels, although not sharply. Below, in solemn stance, Saint Roch stands to the left and Saint Sebastian to the right. The first follows traditional iconography and appears with a pilgrim's staff and a sore on his leg. Saint Sebastian, however, is represented in an unusual way, with the appearance of an elegantly dressed gentleman. He is identifiable only by the two arrows that he holds against his leg with his right hand. The first to mention the atypical iconography of Saint Sebastian was Pietro Da Ponte in 1898. He thought that "it is not unlikely that this saint began as a portrait of a Gambara noble, one of the feudal powers in Pralboino", a likely thesis.

Above, the Madonna is depicted with the Baby Jesus seated on a low throne. There are two steps, covered by a rug, before the throne. The background of the scene is architectural. Two pilasters are visible at the sides, and the Madonna is surrounded by a rectangular window, an open window that opens onto a clouded blue sky.

== Style ==
The painting is considered a testament to the evolution of the Moretto's taste and skills. The lines of the architecture are simple and precise. They are elegantly without decoration but given relief, in the cubic forms, edges of the pilasters, throne of the Madonna, and the base upon which the saints stand, by a raking light.

The figures are painted in detail—for example, the clothes of their characters and above all the cloak of Saint Sebastian. At the same time, the composition has no internal divisions, showing an evolution from Moretto's compositions for the Madonna col Bambino in gloria con i santi Rocco, Martino e Sebastiano in the Santa Maria delle Grazie of Brescia. The canvas, as Camillo Boselli concluded in 1954, definitively closes the immature period of the artist. The painting marks, dateable to 1528 thanks to stylistic similarities with the Assumption Altarpiece and the Dinner at Emmaus, the maturity of the artist, which Moretto reached after various experiments and reflections in composition, concept, and color.

== Bibliography ==
- Camillo Boselli, Il Moretto, 1498-1554, in "Commentari dell'Ateneo di Brescia per l'anno 1954 - Supplemento", Brescia 1954
- Francesco Paglia, Il giardino della pittura, Brescia 1660
- Pier Virgilio Begni Redona, Alessandro Bonvicino: Il Moretto da Brescia, Editrice La Scuola, Brescia 1988
