= Eugenio Binini =

Italian Roman Catholic prelate (1934–2026)

Most Reverend Eugenio Binini
- Bishop Emeritus of Massa Carrara-Pontremoli
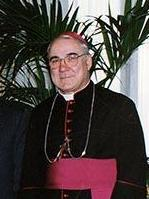
- Binini in 1998
- Church: Catholic Church
- Archdiocese: Pisa
- Diocese: Massa Carrara-Pontremoli
- Installed: 20 July 1991
- Term ended: 19 May 2010
- Predecessor: Bruno Tommasi
- Successor: Giovanni Santucci
- Previous post: Bishop of Pitigliano-Sovana-Orbetello (1983–1991)

Orders
- Ordination: 22 September 1957 by Evasio Colli
- Consecration: 6 January 1984 by Pope John Paul II, Eduardo Martínez Somalo and Duraisamy Simon Lourdusamy

Personal details
- Born: Eugenio Binini; 21 December 1934 Traversetolo, Kingdom of Italy
- Died: 7 May 2026 (aged 91) Traversetolo, Italy
- Education: Pontifical University of Saint Thomas Aquinas, University of Florence
- Motto: In omnibus pax
- Coat of arms

Styles of Eugenio Binini
- Reference style: His Excellency; The Most Reverend
- Spoken style: Your Excellency
- Religious style: Bishop

Eugenio Binini (21 December 1934 – 7 May 2026) was an Italian Roman Catholic prelate, who served as the bishop of Massa Carrara-Pontremoli from 1991 until his retirement in 2010. Previously he served as bishop of Pitigliano-Sovana-Orbetello from 1983 until 1991.

== Biography ==
Eugenio Binini was born in Traversetolo, in the Province of Parma, on 21 December 1934. He made his theological studies at the major seminary of Parma and was ordained a priest for the Diocese of Parma on 22 September 1957.

While serving as a chaplain for the Military Health School in Florence between 1962 and 1972, he continued his academic studies. In 1967, he obtained a diploma in psychology from the Institute of Psychology at the University of Florence. In 1969, he graduated with a degree in theology from the Pontifical University of Saint Thomas Aquinas (the Angelicum) in Rome.

On 3 December 1983, Pope John Paul II appointed him Bishop of the Diocese of Pitigliano-Sovana-Orbetello. He received his episcopal consecration on 6 January 1984 from Pope John Paul II himself at the St. Peter's Basilica in Rome.

Following the transfer of Bishop Bruno Tommasi to Lucca, Binini was appointed Bishop of Massa Carrara-Pontremoli on 20 July 1991. During his nineteen-year tenure, he focused on diocesan restructuring and pastoral visits across the Lunigiana region.

On 19 May 2010, Pope Benedict XVI accepted his resignation from the pastoral governance of the diocese upon reaching the age limit of 75. He was succeeded by Giovanni Santucci.

Binini died in Traversetolo on 7 May 2026, at the age of 91.

Catholic Church titles
Preceded by Bruno Tommasi	Bishop of Massa Carrara-Pontremoli; 1991–2010	Succeeded by Giovanni Santucci
Preceded by Giovanni D’Ascenzi	Bishop of Sovana-Pitigliano-Orbetello; 1983–1991	Succeeded by Giacomo Babini
