= Saverio Cannistrà =

Italian Catholic prelate (born 1958)

Saverio Cannistrà OCD
- Archbishop of Pisa
- Church: Catholic Church
- Archdiocese: Pisa
- Appointed: 6 February 2025
- Predecessor: Giovanni Paolo Benotto

Orders
- Ordination: 24 October 1992 by Alessandro Plotti

Personal details
- Born: Saverio Antonio Gennaro Cannistrà; 3 October 1958 (age 67) Catanzaro, Italy
- Coat of arms

Saverio Antonio Gennaro Cannistrà (born 3 October 1958) is an Italian Roman Catholic prelate who is currently archbishop of the Roman Catholic Archdiocese of Pisa.
