= Massa Cathedral =

Cathedral in Massa, Tuscany, Italy

Coordinates: 44.0380°N 10.1442°E

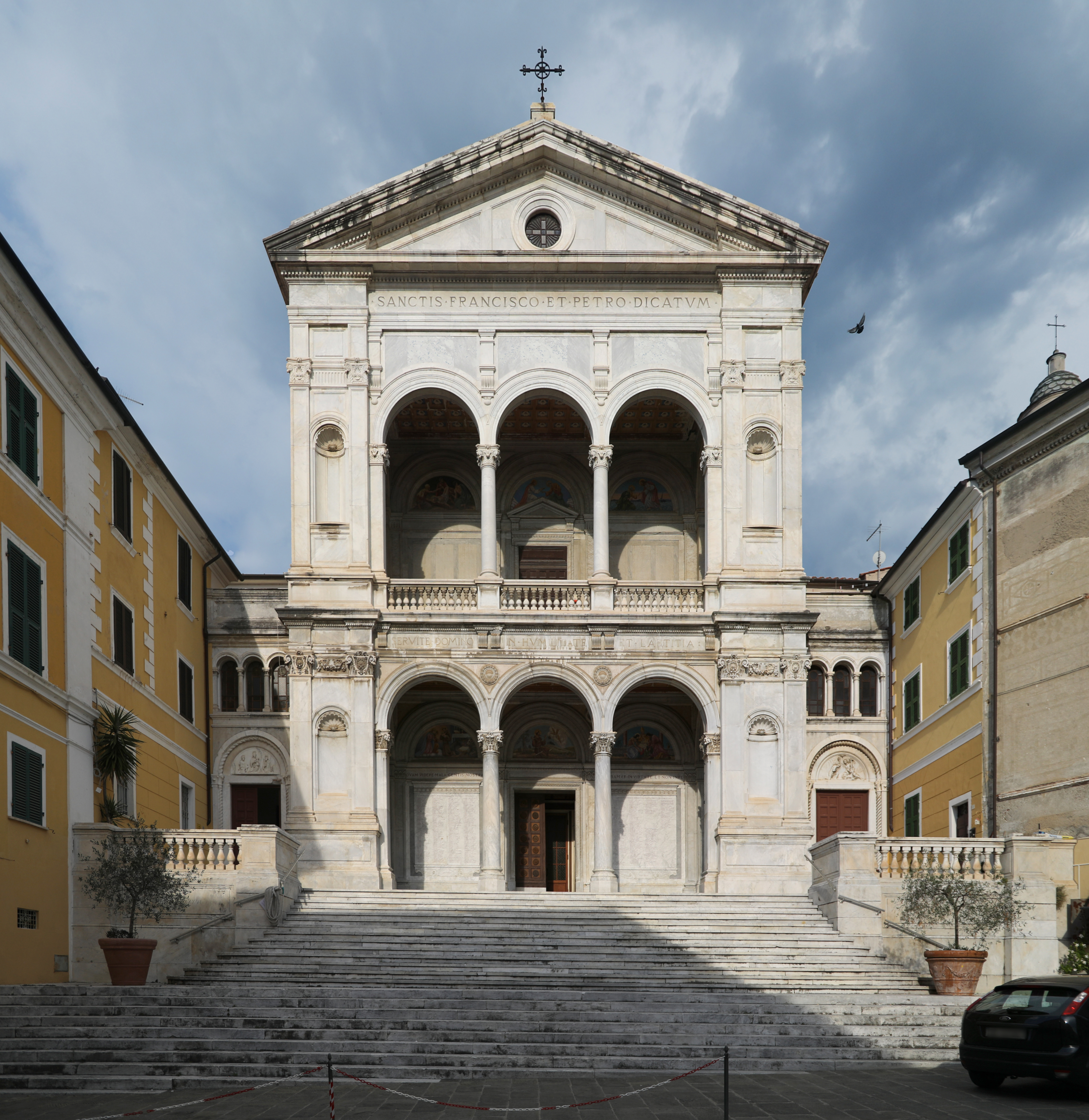
Façade

Massa Cathedral (Italian: Duomo di Massa; Cattedrale dei Santi Pietro e Francesco) is a Roman Catholic cathedral in Massa, Tuscany, central Italy. It is dedicated to Saint Cerbonius. Formerly a conventual church, it was declared the episcopal seat of the Diocese of Massa Carrara at its creation in 1822, and is now the seat of the bishop of Massa Carrara-Pontremoli. (Note: Not to be confused with the so-called Cathedral of St. Sebastian, a large church in the same city.)

== History ==
The church originated as a pieve dedicated to Saint Peter, enlarged in the 16th and 17th century. It became a collegiate church in 1629.

In 1672, the building collapsed, and at the end of the century was replaced by a new one, designed by Alessandro Bergamini. This construction was demolished by order of duchess Elisa Bonaparte (sister of Napoleon) in 1807, when the dedication to Saint Peter was transferred to the church of Saint Francis in Massa, which had been reconstructed in 1660–1670. This church had a large marble high altar, with further altars in the transept, and paintings by Carlo Maratta (Mary Immaculate) and Luigi Garzi (Trinity in Glory with Saints), which have been preserved until today. Behind the south transept altar is the burial chapel of the Malaspina family, commissioned by duke Alberico II.

In 1822, at the creation of the diocese of Massa, the church of St. Francis was declared its cathedral.
