= Palazzo Comunale, Massa Marittima =

Palazzo Comunale
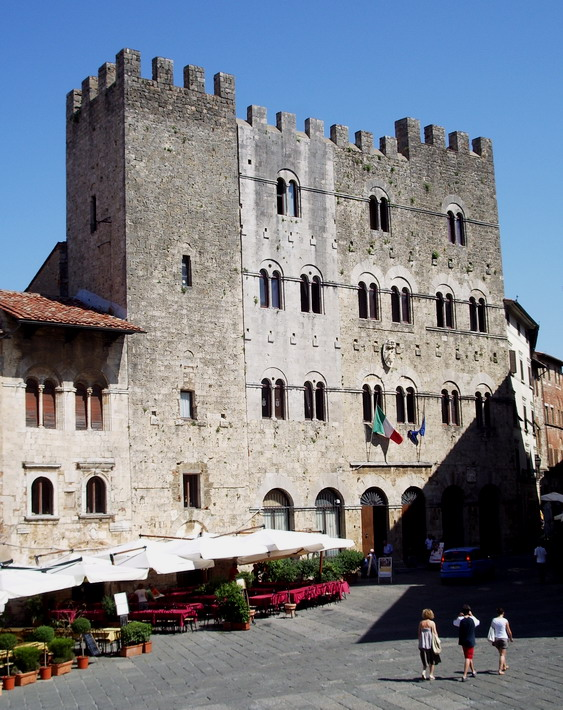
- The Palazzo Comunale in 2009
- Click on the map for a fullscreen view

General information
- Location: Massa Marittima, Italy
- Coordinates: 43°03′01.2″N 10°53′17″E

The Palazzo Comunale is a historic town hall located in Massa Marittima, Tuscany, Italy.

== History ==
The building results from the union of two tower houses constructed at different periods. The older one, the Bargello Tower, forming the right-hand part of the building, dates back to the 13th century, while the second, the Conti Biserno Tower, corresponding to the left-hand section, dates from 1334 and was initially distinguished by its more modest height. The central structure, which connects the two towers, appeared in the 14th century in the Gothic style. From 1555 onward, the emblem of the House of Medici dominates the façade, marking the annexation of the territory to the Grand Duchy of Tuscany.

== Description ==
The building is located in the main square of the town, opposite the Massa Marittima Cathedral.

It features a Gothic style and double-lancet windows and travertine façades. On the inside, the building houses the Priors' Chapel.
