= Comencini =

Comencini (Italian: [komenˈtʃiːni]) is an Italian surname from Lombardy and Veneto, originally indicating people from the area of Lake Como (particularly Comacine masters). Notable people with the surname include:

- Cristina Comencini (born 1956), Italian film director, scriptwriter and novelist, daughter of Luigi
- Fabrizio Comencini (born 1953), Italian Venetist politician
- Francesca Comencini (born 1961), Italian film director and screenwriter, daughter of Luigi
- Luigi Comencini (1916–2007), Italian film director
