= Massa Marittima Cathedral =

Cathedral in Massa Marittima, Tuscany, Italy

Coordinates: 43.0497°N 10.8879°E

- Cathedral of Saint Cerbonius
- Duomo di Massa Marittima (Italian)
- Cattedrale di San Cerbone (Italian)
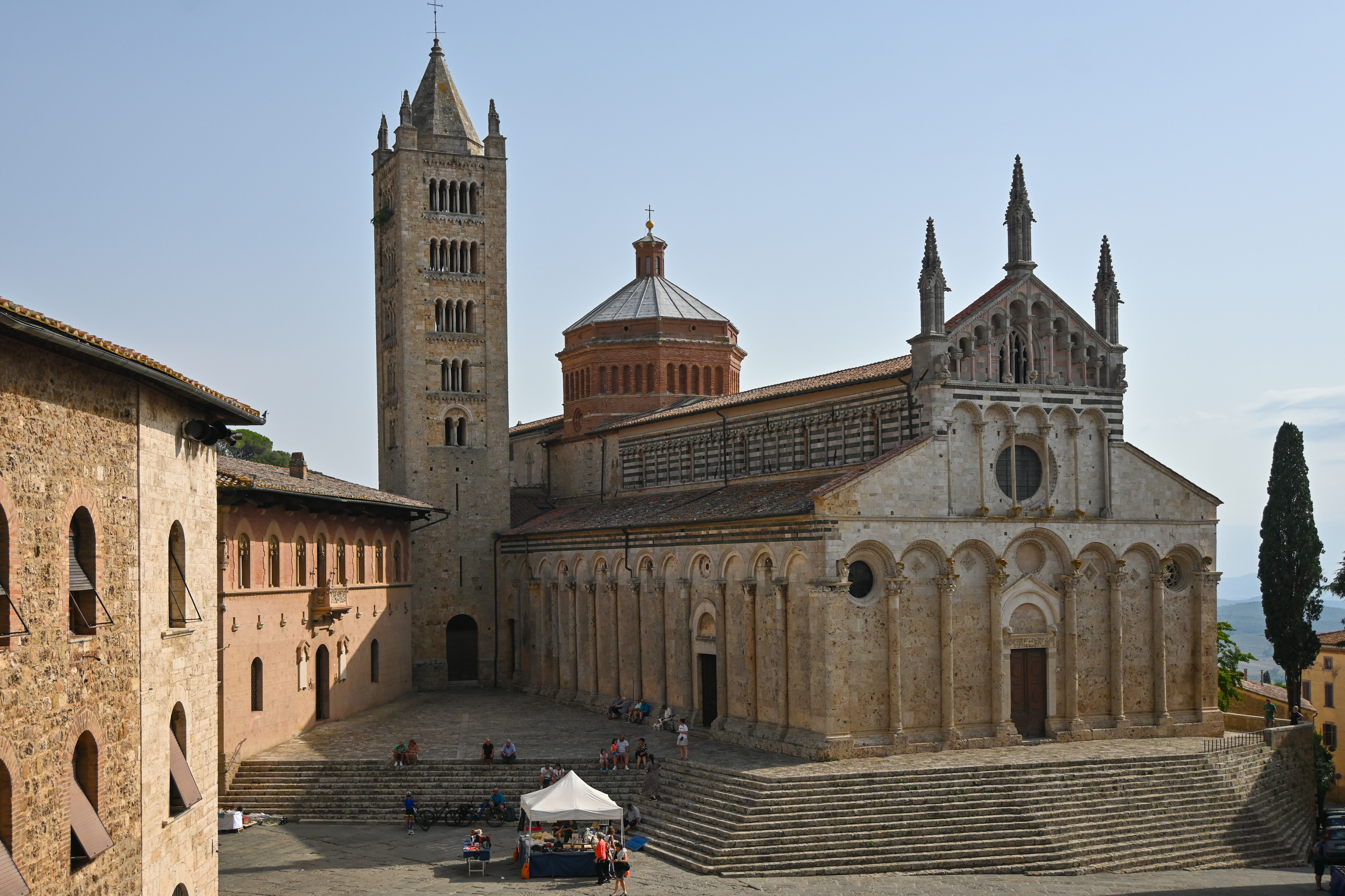
- Massa Marittima Cathedral
- Massa Marittima Cathedral
- Location: Massa Marittima, Tuscany
- Address: Piazza Garibaldi
- Country: Italy
- Denomination: Roman Catholic
- Tradition: Latin Rite

History
- Status: Cathedral

Architecture
- Style: Romanesque

Administration
- Diocese: Massa Marittima-Piombino

Clergy
- Bishop: Carlo Ciattini

Massa Marittima Cathedral (Italian: Duomo di Massa Marittima; Cattedrale di San Cerbone) is a Roman Catholic cathedral in Massa Marittima, Tuscany, Italy, dedicated to Saint Cerbonius. Formerly the episcopal seat of the Diocese of Massa Marittima, it is now that of the Diocese of Massa Marittima-Piombino.

== Architecture ==
The cathedral measures 58.72 metres (192.7 ft) by 18 metres (59 ft) and is built on the ground plan of a Latin cross.

The façade reveals the different influences which inspired the anonymous architect: the blind arcades with round columns in the lower part, decorated with circular openings and lozenges, the loggiato in the middle part and the surmounting tympanum are in Pisan Romanesque style. The large ogival mullioned window and the three spires show instead a Sienese influence.

The central portal flanked by two rectangular columns carrying an architrave with five reliefs dating from the early 13th century illustrating the legend of Saint Cerbonius. The springers of the round arch above are lion heads, while the lion figures atop the imposts of the blind arches have feet between which some of them hold their prey. Almost all of the sculptural work, including the capitals and the splayed openings, were done by Comacine masters from Lombardy. Except for the three figures the three central columns of the tympanum rest on: a bearded man, a griffin and a horse, at least the animal figures are attributed to the workshop of Giovanni Pisano.

The octagonal tambour of the crossing, standing at 37.86 metres (124.2 ft), is a brickwork from the 15th century. The bell tower attached to the north transept is the original 13th-century one in the lower part while the upper stories are a 19th-century addition.

=== East view and details of the exterior ===
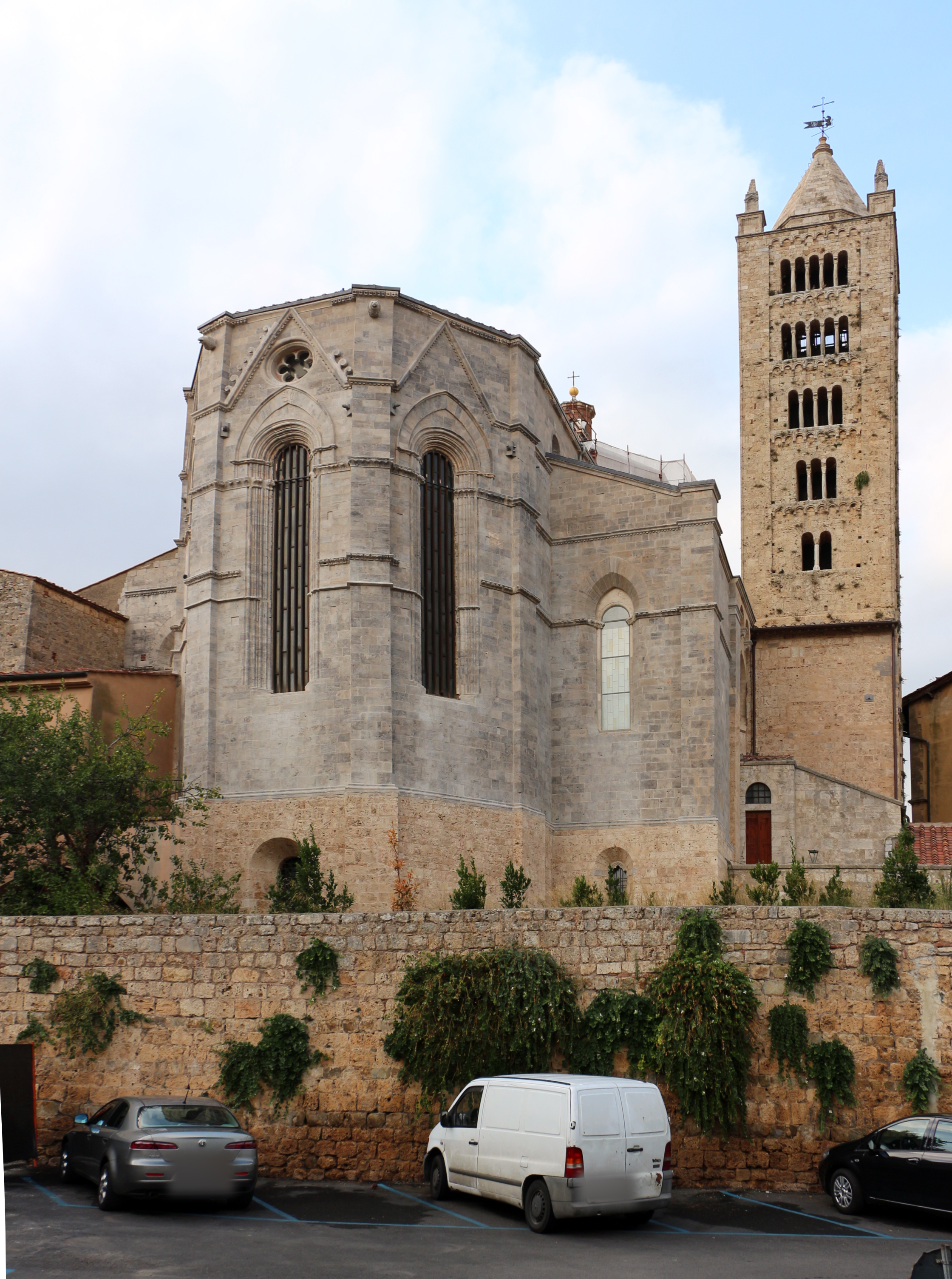
Apse and bell tower

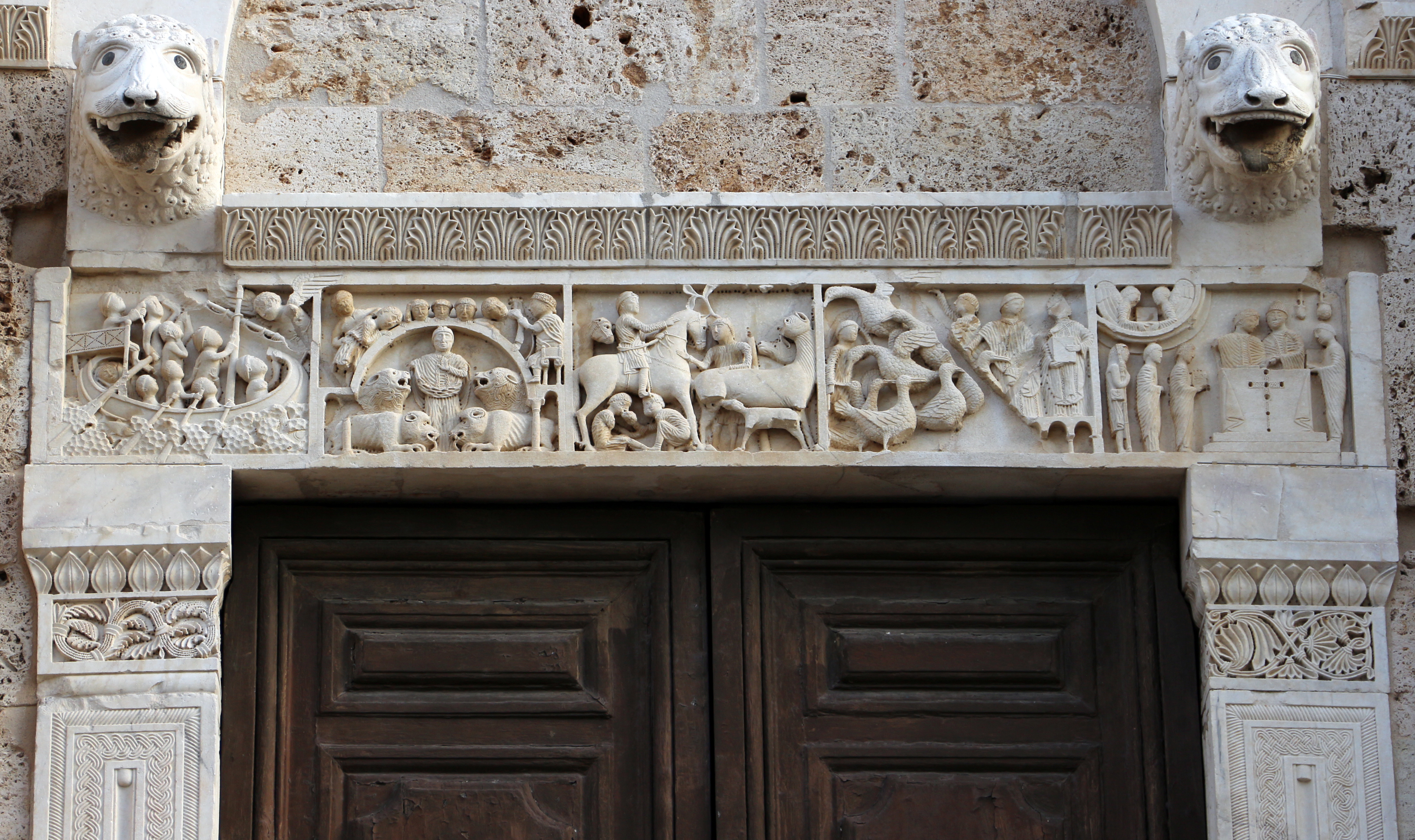
Comacine works with scenes of the life of San Cerbone on the architrave above the main portal, 13th ct.

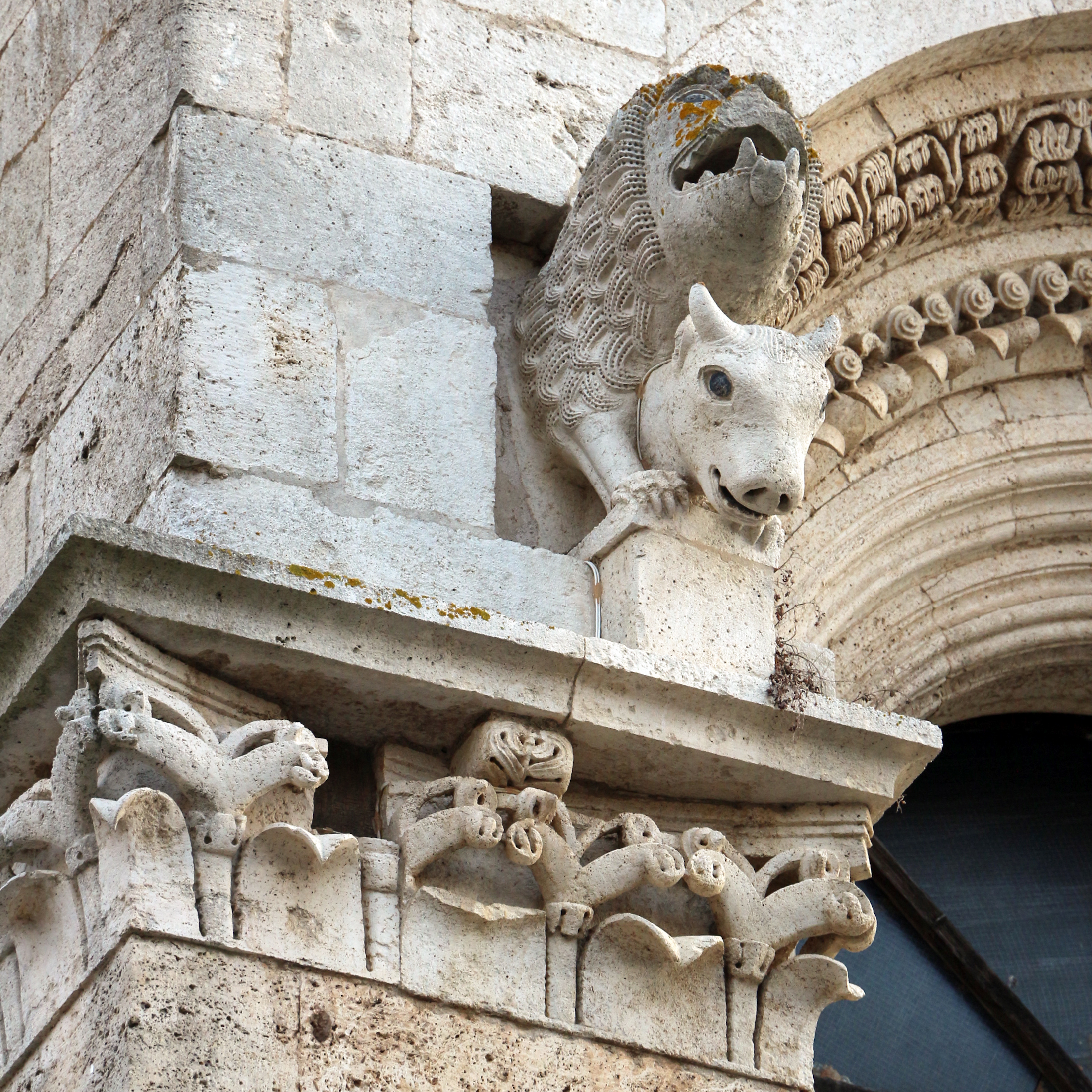
Figural decoration by Comacine masters, 13th ct., north corner of the facade

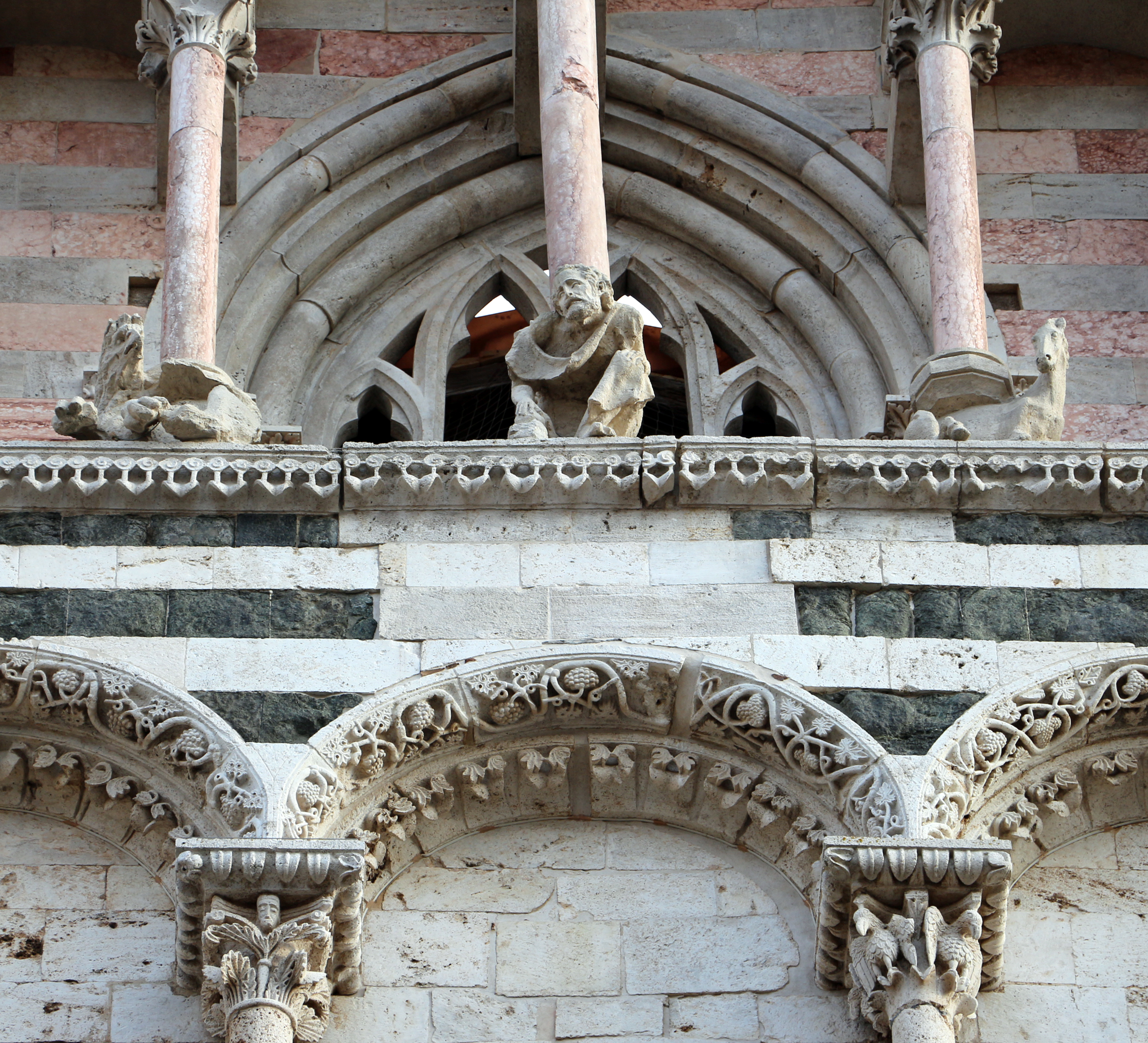
Griffin and horse as atlantes by the workshop of Giovanni Pisano

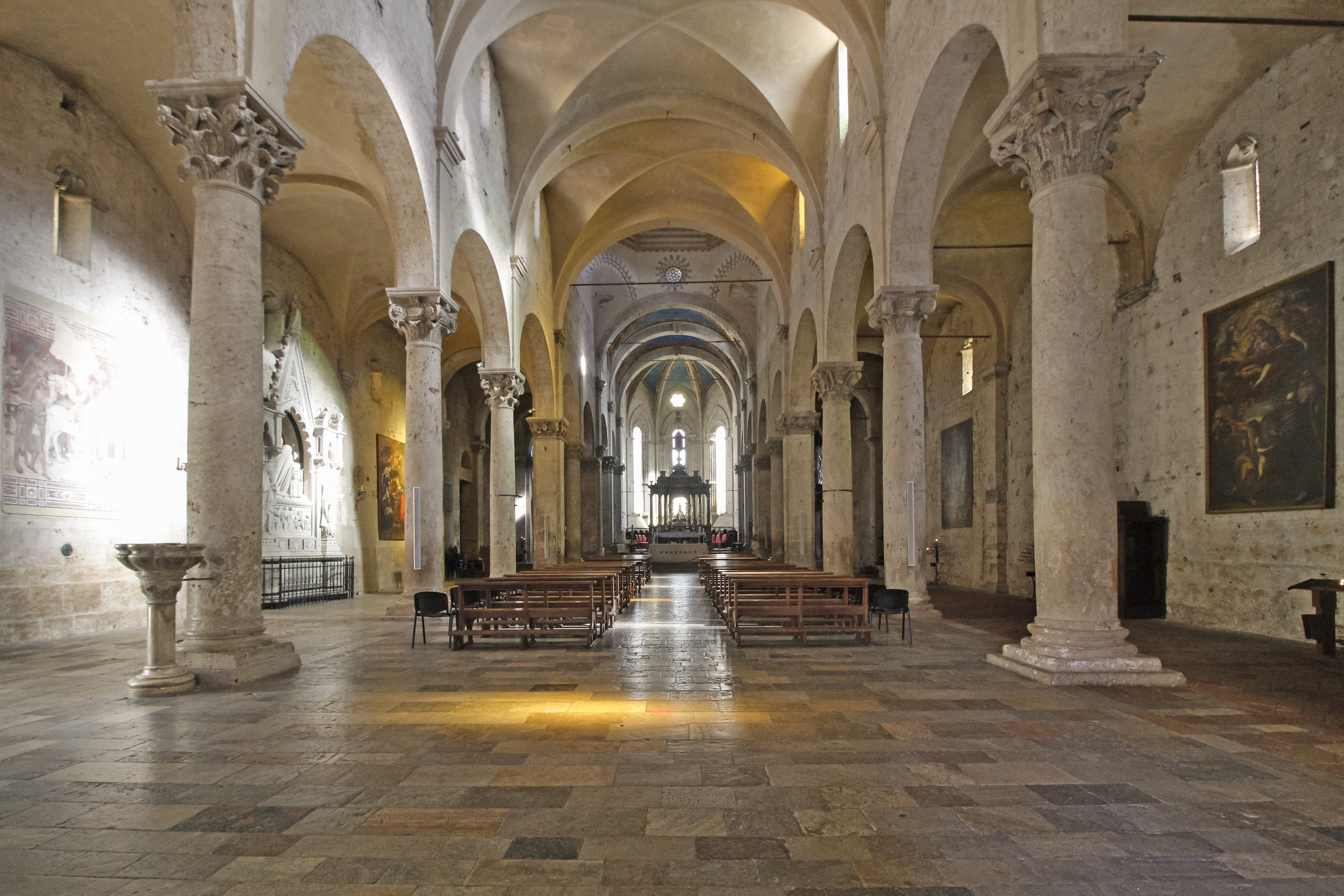
The nave looking east

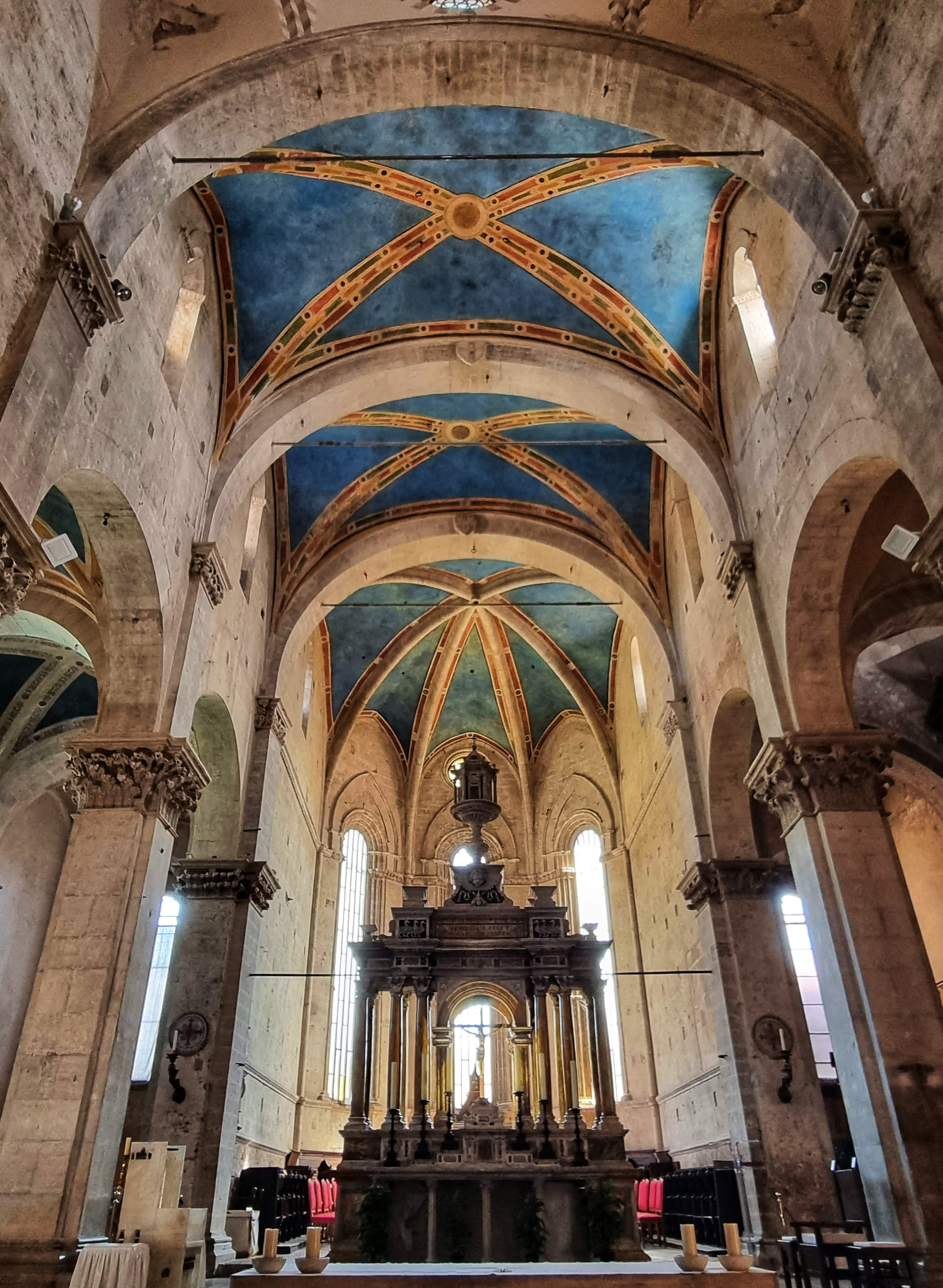
The high altar in front of the choir

== Interior ==
The interior has a basilica plan with an apse and two aisles, divided by cylindrical columns and cruciform pilasters which end in complex composite capitals. Next to the entrance door, under the 14th century triptych of the Madonna Enthroned with Child and Saints, is a Roman sarcophagus from the 4th century. On the right of the counter-façade is a series of panels in soft stone, dating from the High Middle Ages or, according to some sources, to the 12th-13th century. Over the panels are frescoes of the Crucifixion, of the 14th century, and the legend of Saint Julian, of the 15th century.

The central rose window has rare stained glass of the Sienese School. On the left is the monumental baptismal font, with a rectangular bath surmounted by a small temple. The baptistery dates from 1267.

The south aisle houses paintings/sculptures of the Madonna in Glory by Antonio Nasini (late 17th century) and the Nativity of the Virgin by Rutilio Manetti (16th century). In the chapel on the right of the presbytery is a painted cross by Segna di Bonaventura (14th century). The wooden pulpit is of the 17th century. Also by Rutilio Manetti are the paintings/sculptures of the Immaculate Conception and the Eternal Father in the chapel to the right of the major one.

The high altar, in marble (1626), has a polychrome wooden crucifix by Giovanni Pisano (early 14th century). At the foot of the altar are two wooden angels from the 15th century, by Domenico di Niccolò dei Cori. Behind it is the Ark of Saint Cerbonius, which was created in 1342, with reliefs depicting stories of the saint.

On the right wall is a 15th-century fresco of Saint Cerbonius Accompanied by Ducks, while a Maestà attributed to Duccio di Buoninsegna (1316) can be seen in the chapel to the left of the major one, together with an Annunciation by Raffaello Vanni (17th century).

The crypt houses small statues of prophets and saints by an unknown mid-14th-century Sienese sculptor, and a 15th-century fresco, Crucifixion with Saint Cerbonius and Saint Bonaventura of Siena.

=== Details of the interior ===
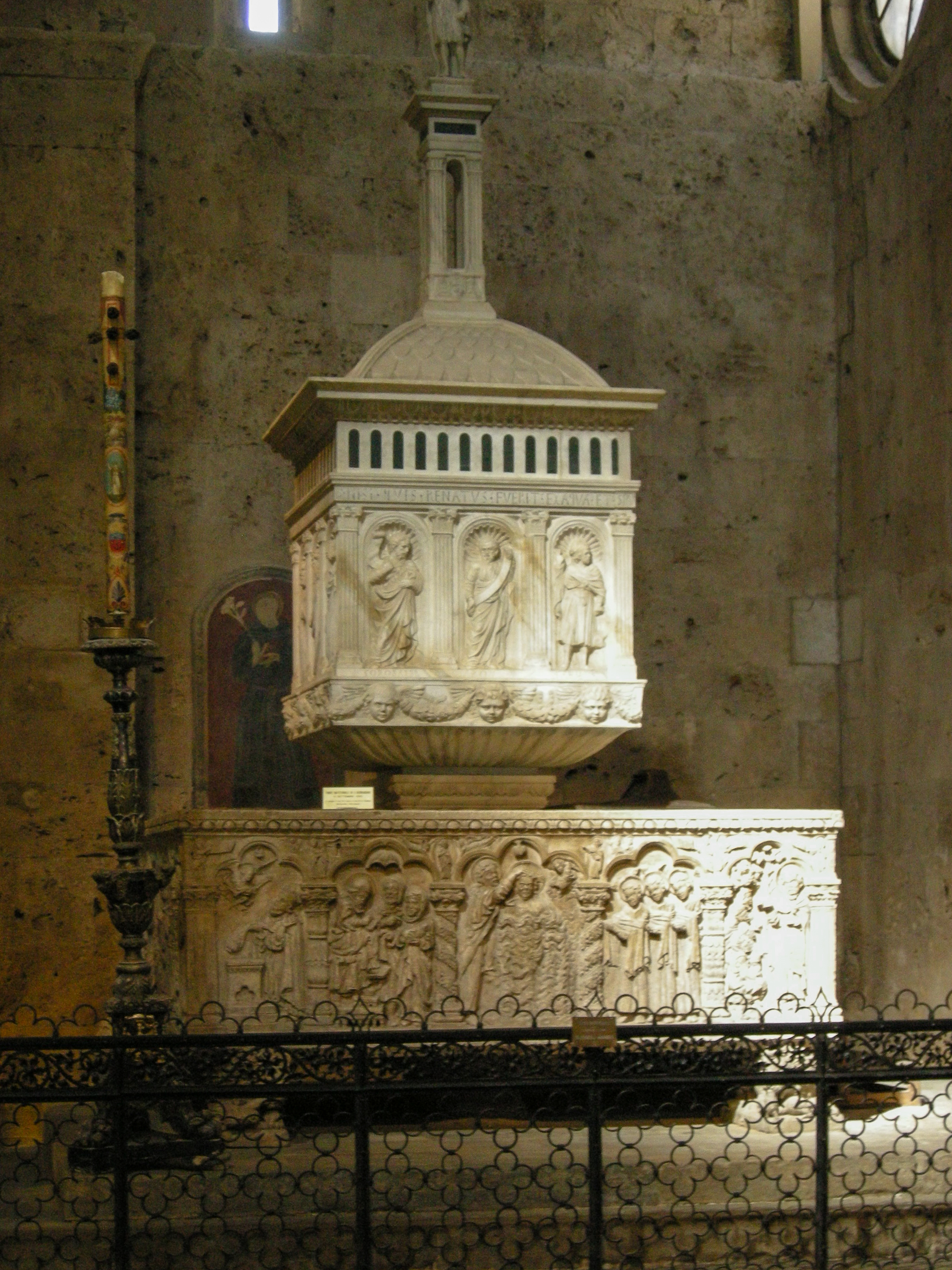
Baptismal font by Giroldo da Como (1267) and a tabernacle from 1447

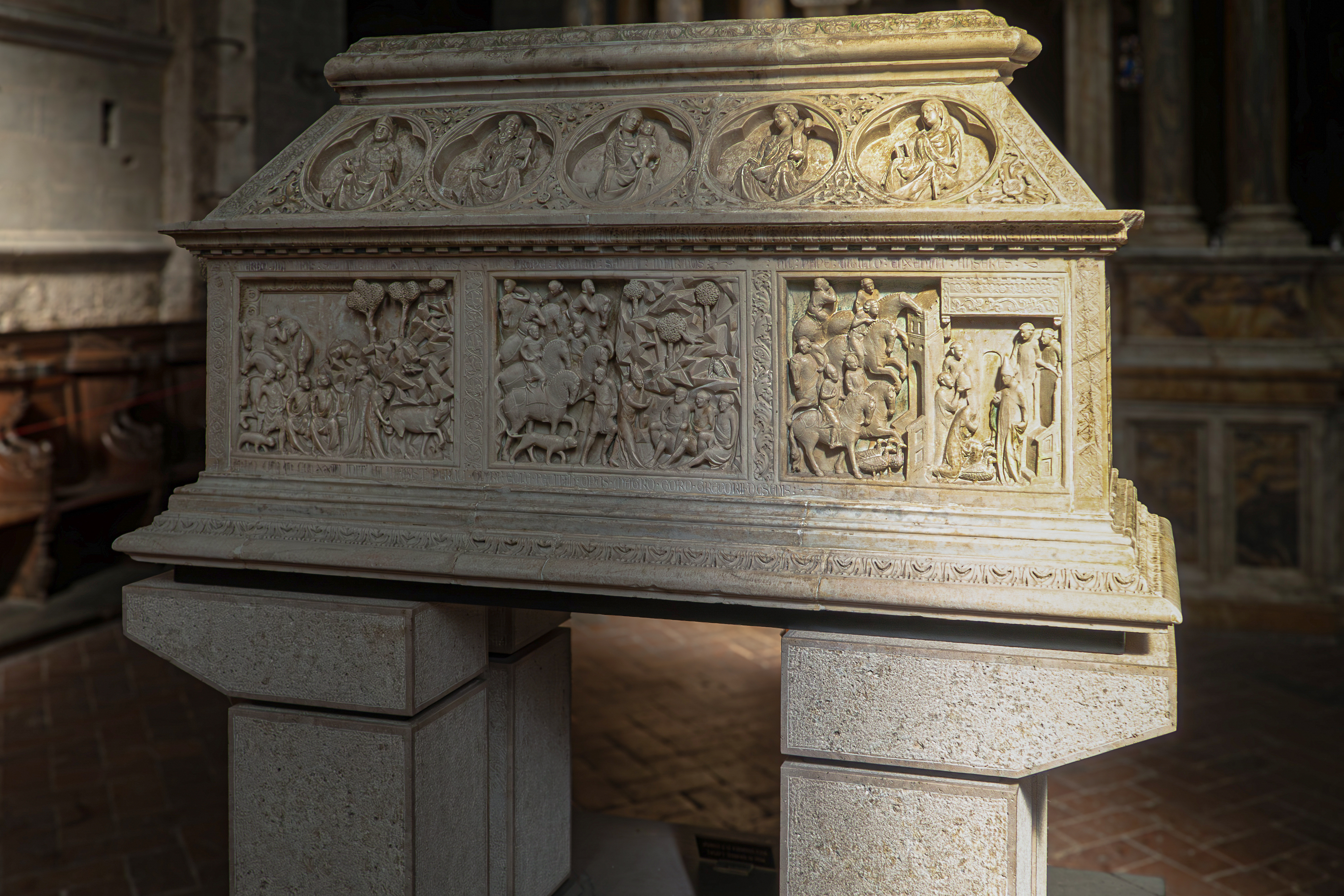
Sarcophagus of Saint Cerbonius

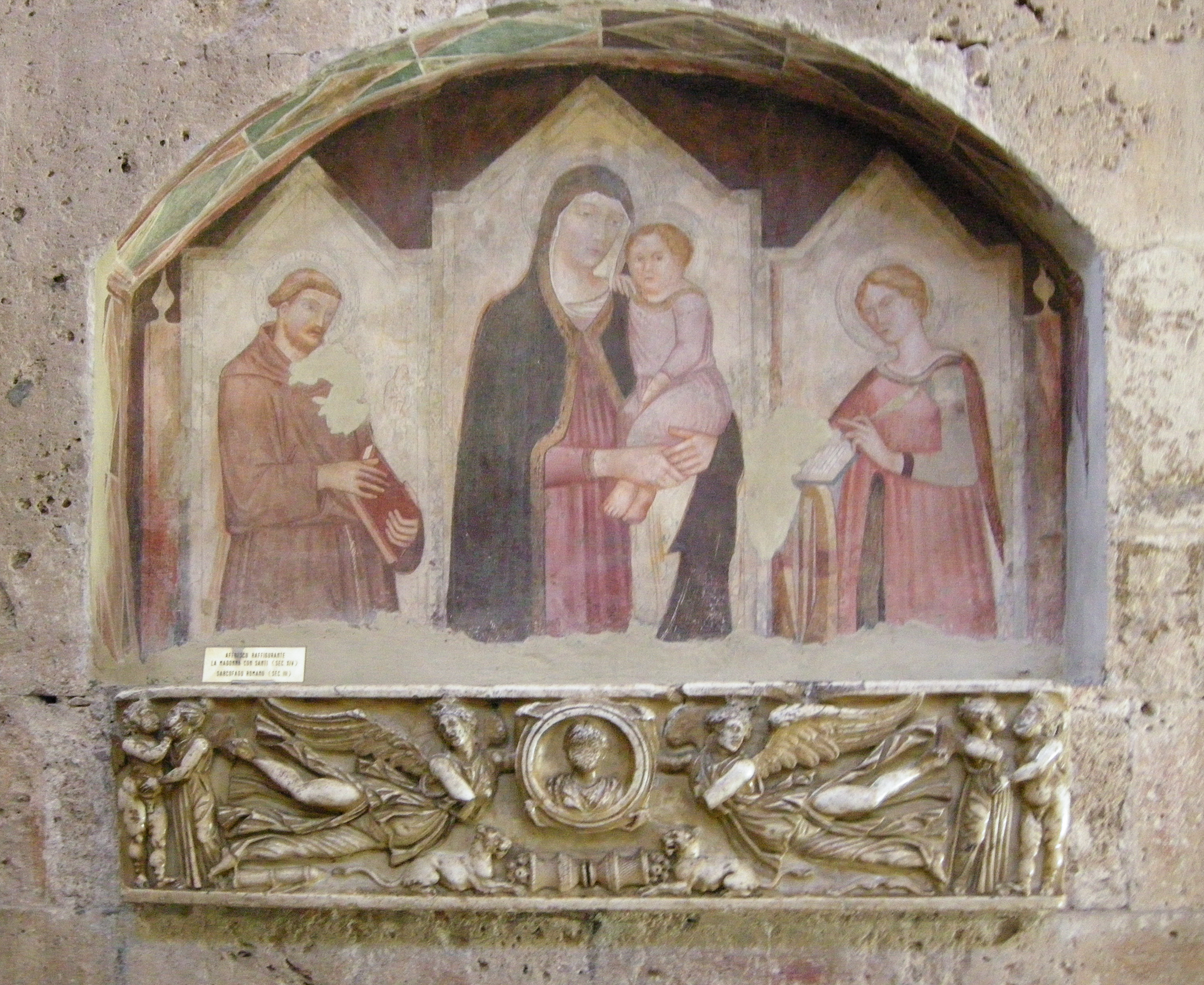
14th ct. fresco of Madonna and Child with Two Saints above a Roman sarcophagus in an arcosolium

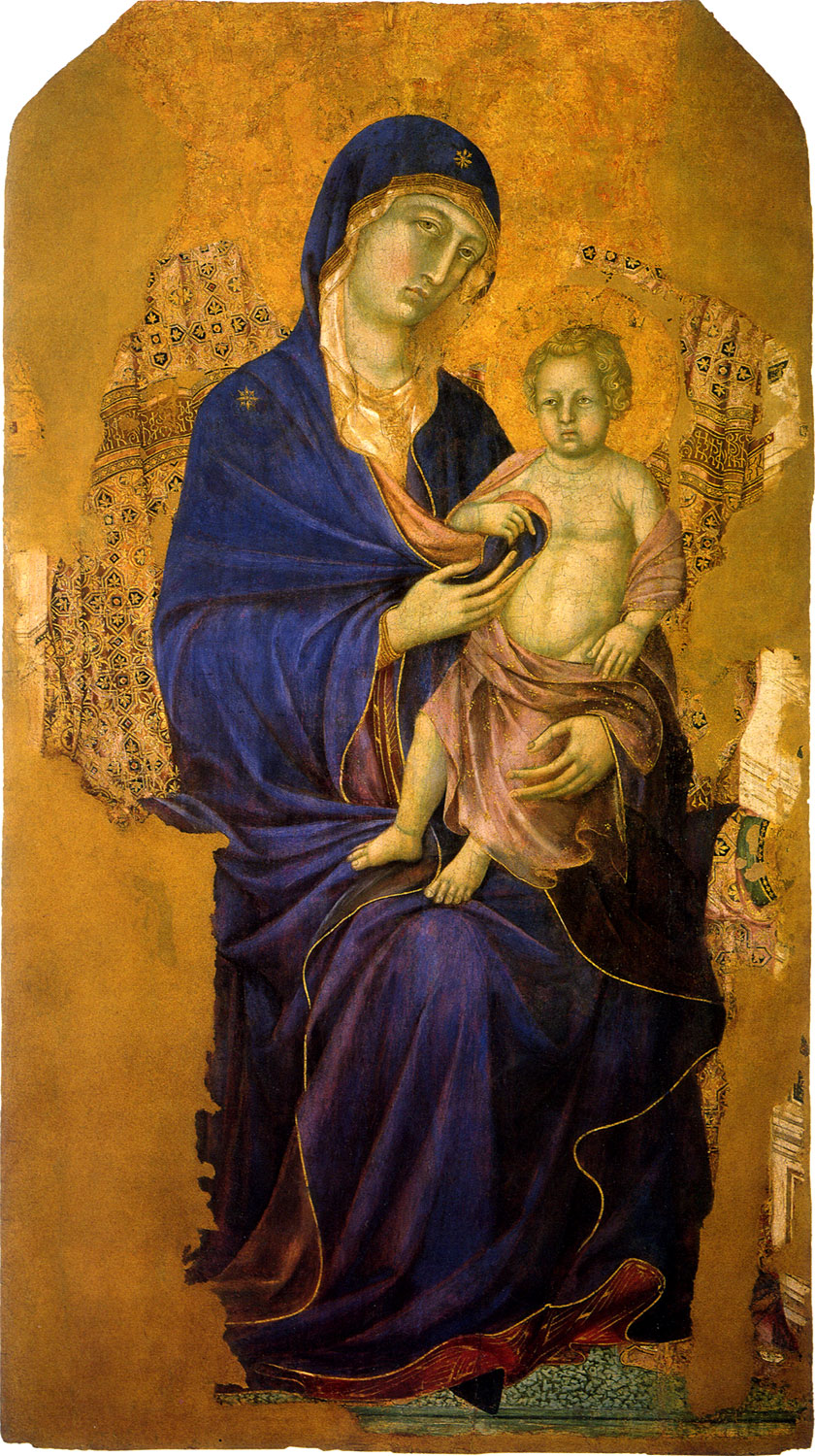
A Maestà by Duccio di Buoninsegna (ca. 1316)

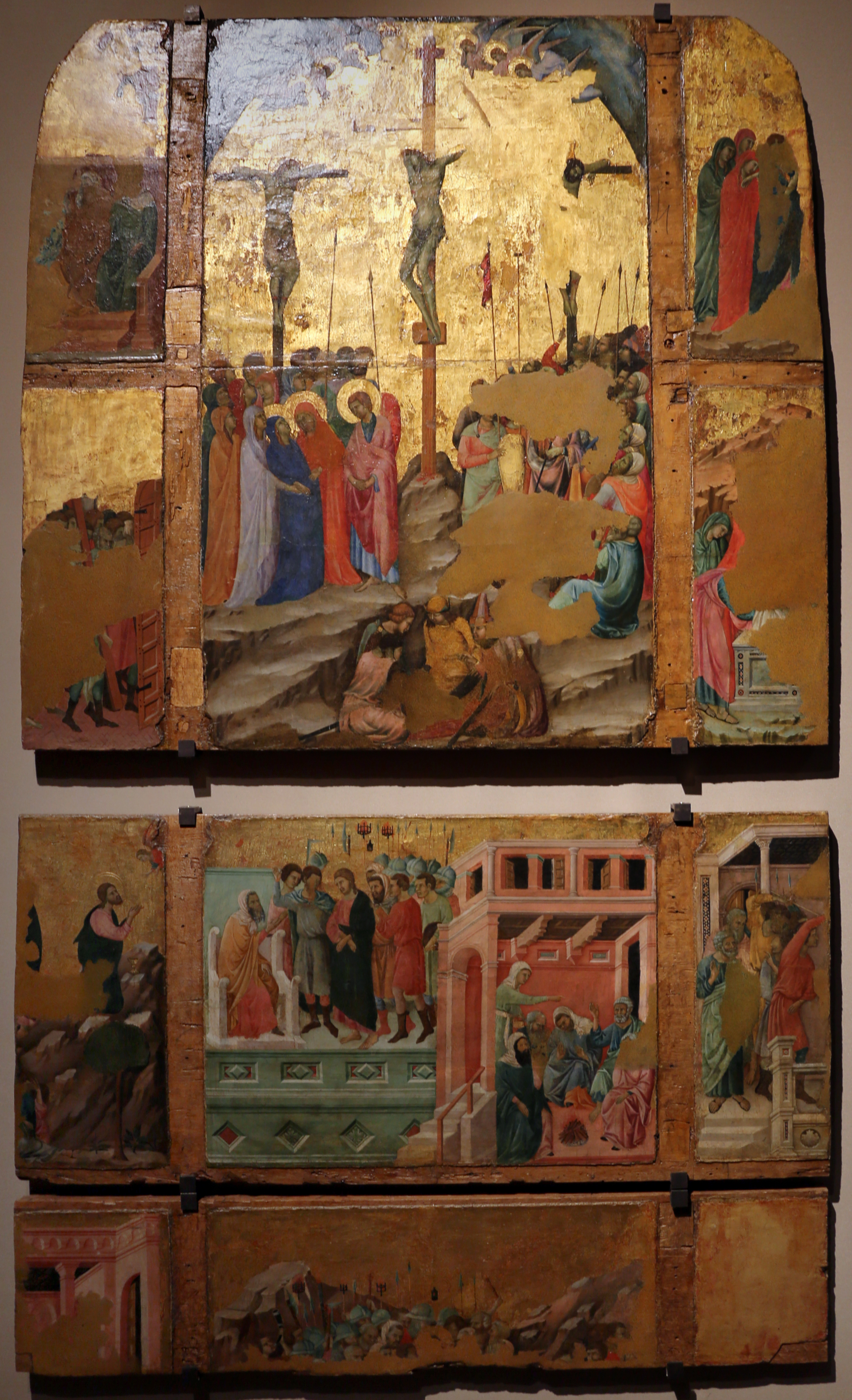
Detached panels from the back of the Maestà with scenes from the Passion of Jesus

== See also ==
- High medieval domes

== Sources ==
- Salvi, Francesco, ed. (1999). "Massa Marittima". Luoghi d'italia. Le città e i dintorni. Florence: Franco Cantini Editore.
