= Diocese of Massa Carrara-Pontremoli =

Roman Catholic diocese in Italy

Coordinates: 44.0333°N 10.1333°E

Diocese of Massa Carrara-Pontremoli Dioecesis Massensis-Apuana

Catholic
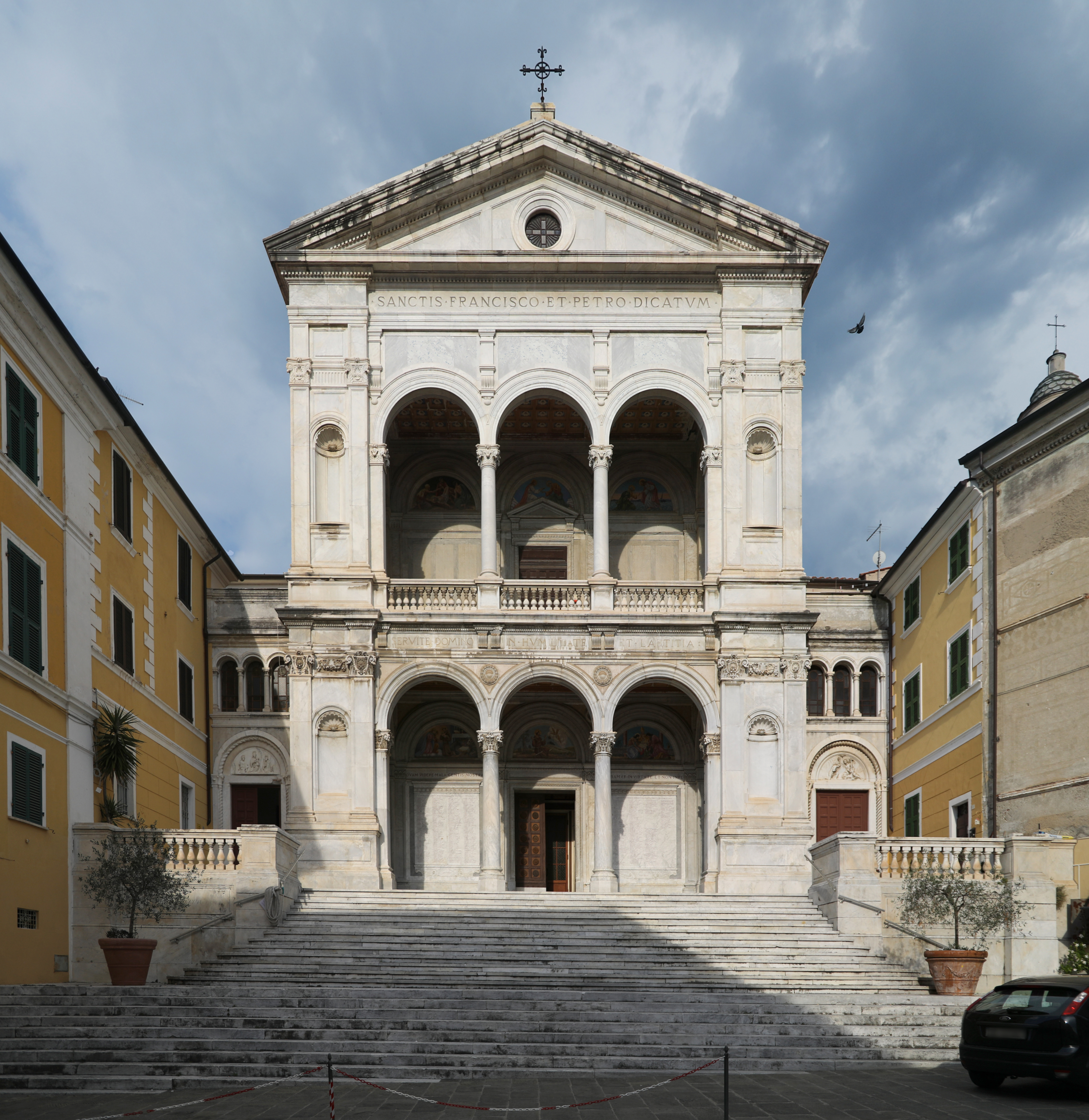
- Massa Cathedral

Location
- Country: Italy
- Ecclesiastical province: Pisa

Statistics
- Area: 1,186 km^{2} (458 sq mi)
- Population: Total; Catholics: (as of 2021); 207,050 (est.); 203,500 (guess)
- Parishes: 244

Information
- Denomination: Catholic Church
- Rite: Roman Rite
- Established: 18 February 1822 (204 years ago)
- Cathedral: Basilica Cattedrale di S. Pietro Apostolo e S. Francesco d’Assisi (Massa)
- Co-cathedral: Concattedrale di S. Maria Assunta (Pontremoli)
- Secular priests: 107 (Diocesan); 18 (Religious Orders); 28 Permanent Deacons

Current leadership
- Pope: Leo XIV
- Bishop: Mario Vaccari, O.F.M.
- Bishops emeritus: Giovanni Santucci

Map

Website
- massacarrara.chiesacattolica.it

The Diocese of Massa Carrara-Pontremoli (Latin: Dioecesis Massensis-Apuana) is a Latin diocese of the Catholic Church situated in north-western Tuscany, in the valley of the Frigido River. The city of Massa is on the south side of the river, 5 km (3 mi) from the Tyrrhenian Sea. The city of Carrara is 6 km (4 mi) north of Massa, on the Carrione River. The diocese is a suffragan of the Archdiocese of Pisa.

The historical Diocese of Massa Carrara had its name changed in 1939 to Diocese of Apuania; and again in 1986 to Diocese of Massa. In 1988 it was united with the Diocese of Pontremoli.

== History ==
The see of Massa Carrara was created on 18 February 1822 by Pope Pius VII, at the instance of Maria Beatrice d'Este, Duchess of Massa, in the bull "Singularis Romanorum". The collegiate church of S. Pietro e Francesco was suppressed, and the church was elevated to the status of cathedral of the new diocese and a parish church. The cathedral was to be staffed and administered by a corporation called the Chapter, consisting of an archpriest and twelve canons. The archpriest was to act as the pastor of the cathedral parish.

An episcopal palace, which had been his "Pallazina", was donated to the diocese by Duke Francesco IV.

The diocese was then suffragan of the Archdiocese of Pisa; but for a period from 22 August 1855 to 1926 it was a suffragan of the Archdiocese of Modena.

Its first bishop was Francesco Maria Zoppi. The second bishop, Francesco Strani, held the first diocesan synod in the cathedral in Massa in September 1839.

On 18 November 1900, Bishop Emilio Miniati of Massa and Bishop Angelo Fiorini of Pontremoli reached an agreement to transfer sixteen parishes from the diocese of Pontremoli to Massa. The agreement was ratified by Pope Leo XIII on 9 January 1901.

On 16 December 1938, the Fascist government of Italy ordered the amalgamation of three cities, Massa, Carrara, and Montignoso, into one comune, called Apuania, in a province also called Apuania. The Vatican had no option but to change the name of the diocese of Massa to conform with civil requirements; this took place on 20 July 1939. On 10 January 1946, a legal decree of the Italian government restored the former names. The Vatican, however, continued to use "Apuania".

On 18 November 1964, the cathedral of Ss. Peter the Apostle and Francis of Assisi in Massa (still called Apuania) was granted the title and privileges of a minor basilica by Pope Paul VI.

By a decree of the Sacred Congregation of Bishops on 30 September 1986, with the approval of Pope John Paul II, the name of the diocese was changed from "Dioecesis Apuanus" to "Diocese Massanensis". This, in effect, cancelled the papal degree of 20 July 1939, so that the name of the diocese and the name of the city in which the bishop's seat was located should be the same.

On 5 September 1992, the Congregation of Bishops removed a number of parishes from the diocese of Massa-Apuana (including the Garfagnana) and attached them to the diocese of Lucca.

== Bishops ==
=== Diocese of Massa ===
Erected: 18 February 1822
Latin Name: Massensis
Metropolitan: Archdiocese of Pisa

- Francesco Maria Zoppi (17 November 1823 – 1 October 1832; Resigned)
- Francesco Strani (23 June 1834 – 16 December 1855)
- Giacomo Bernardi (16 June 1856 – 23 December 1871)
- Giovanni Battista Alessio Tommasi (6 May 1872 – 7 August 1887)
- Amilcare Tonietti (25 November 1887 – 1893)
- Emilio Maria Miniati (18 May 1894 – 29 April 1909; Resigned)
- Giovanni Battista Marenco, S.D.B. (29 April 1909 – 1917)
- Giuseppe Bertazzoni (30 June 1917 – 2 July 1933)
- Cristoforo Arduino Terzi, O.F.M. (11 May 1934 – 10 July 1945; Resigned)

=== Diocese of Apuania ===
Name Changed: 20 July 1939
Latin Name: Apuaniensis
Metropolitan: Archdiocese of Pisa

- Carlo Boiardi (30 October 1945 – 24 February 1970)
- Aldo Forzoni (23 April 1970 – 23 February 1988; Retired)

=== Diocese of Massa ===
Name Changed: 30 September 1986
Latin Name: Massensis

- Aldo Forzoni (23 April 1970 – 23 February 1988; Retired)

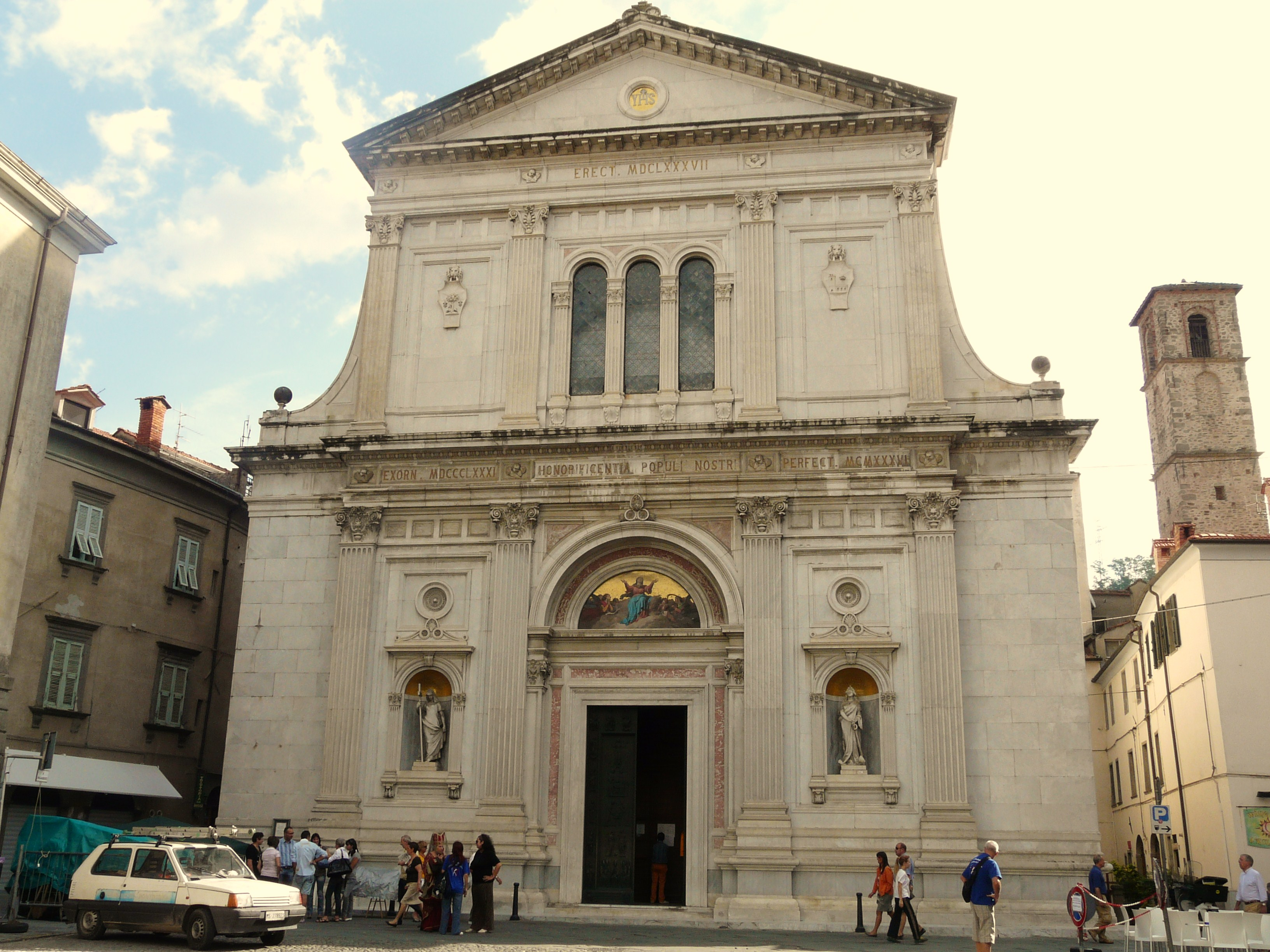
Co-cathedral in Pontremoli

=== Diocese of Massa Carrara-Pontremoli ===
United: 23 February 1988 with the Diocese of Pontremoli
Latin Name: Massensis-Apuanus
Metropolitan: Archdiocese of Pisa

- Bruno Tommasi (23 February 1988 – 1991)
- Eugenio Binini (20 July 1991 – 19 May 2010 Retired)
- Giovanni Santucci (19 May 2010 – January 2021; Resigned)
- Gianni Ambrosio (Apostolic administrator, 15 January 2021 –)

== Bibliography ==
=== Reference works for bishops ===
- Gams, Pius Bonifatius (1873). Series episcoporum Ecclesiae catholicae: quotquot innotuerunt a beato Petro apostolo (in Latin). Ratisbon: Typis et Sumptibus Georgii Josephi Manz. pp. 739–741.
- Ritzler, Remigius; Sefrin, Pirminus (1968). Hierarchia Catholica medii et recentioris aevi (in Latin). Vol. VII (1800–1846). Monasterii: Libreria Regensburgiana.
- Remigius Ritzler; Pirminus Sefrin (1978). Hierarchia catholica Medii et recentioris aevi (in Latin). Vol. VIII (1846–1903). Il Messaggero di S. Antonio.
- Pięta, Zenon (2002). Hierarchia catholica medii et recentioris aevi (in Latin). Vol. IX (1903–1922). Padua: Messagero di San Antonio. ISBN 978-88-250-1000-8.

=== Studies ===
- Camaiani, Bruna Bocchini (1994), "I vescovi toscani nel periodo lorense," (in Italian), in: Istituzioni e societa in Toscana nell'eta moderna. Atti delle giornate di studio dedicate a Giuseppe Pansini Firenze 4-5 dicembre 1992 (Roma: Ministero per i beni culturali e ambientale 1994), pp. 681–716.
- Cappelletti, Giuseppe (1859). Le chiese d'Italia: dalla loro origine sino ai nostri giorni (in Italian). Vol. Tomo decimoquinto (15). Venezia: G. Antonelli. pp. 411–424.
