= Bruno Tommasi =

Italian archbishop and theologian (1930–2015)

- Archbishop of Lucca
- Church: Catholic Church
- Archdiocese: Archdiocese of Lucca
- In office: 20 March 1991 – 22 January 2005
- Predecessor: Giuliano Agresti
- Successor: Benvenuto Italo Castellani
- Previous posts: Bishop of Massa Carrara-Pontremoli (1988-1991); Bishop of Pontremoli (1983-1988); Coadjutor Bishop of Apuania (1983-1988)

Orders
- Ordination: 6 July 1958 by Antonio Torrini
- Consecration: 12 July 1983 by Paolo Bertoli

Personal details
- Born: 14 January 1930 Montignoso, Province of Massa-Carrara, Kingdom of Italy
- Died: 17 September 2015 (aged 85) Viareggio, Tuscany, Italy

Bruno Tommasi (14 January 1930 – 17 September 2015) was an Italian Roman Catholic bishop.

He was born in Montignoso and ordained a priest in 1958. Tommasi was named the bishop of Pontremoli in June 1983 and simultaneously served as coadjutor bishop of Apuania until July 1983. Pontremoli was combined with Massa Carrara in 1988, and was led by Tommasi through 1991, when he was appointed the archbishop of Lucca. He retired in 2005.
