= Cerbonius =

Bishop of Populonia

Saint Cerbonius
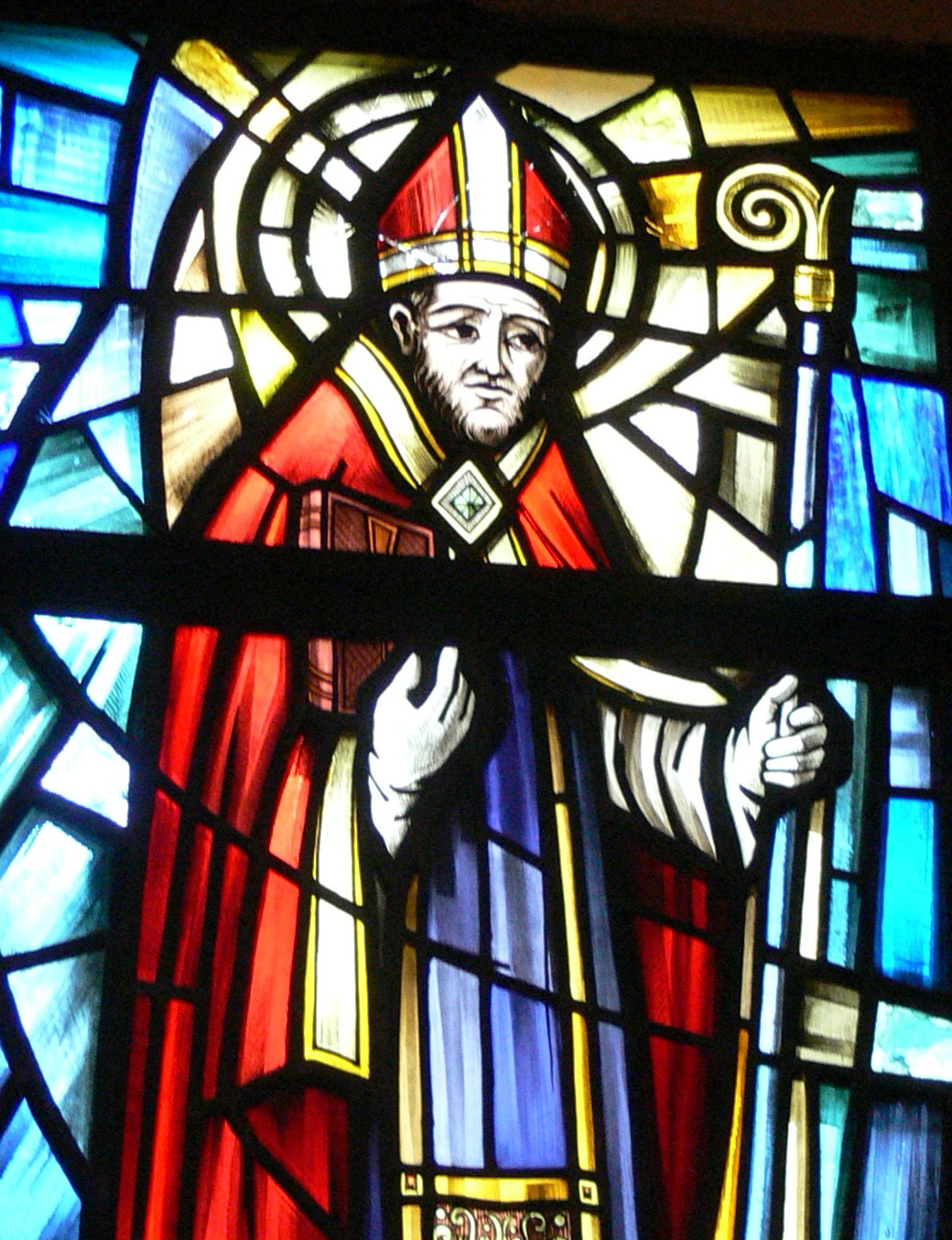
- St Cerbonius of Populonia in stained glass, Sanctuary of the Madonna del Monte (Marciana).
- Born: c. 493 AD; North Africa
- Died: 575 AD; Elba
- Venerated in: Roman Catholic Church, Eastern Orthodox Church
- Feast: October 10
- Attributes: geese; bear licking his feet
- Patronage: Massa Marittima

Cerbonius (Latin: Cerbo; Italian: Cerbone, Cerbonio; died 575 AD) was a bishop of Populonia during the Barbarian invasions. Pope Gregory I praises him in Book XI of his Dialogues.

== Traditions and legends ==
An alternate tradition made him a bishop of Massa Marittima around 544 AD, and devotion to the saint in this city arose after Massa Marittima became an episcopal center.

Another tradition states that Cerbonius was a native of North Africa who was the son of Christian parents. He was ordained a priest by Regulus (Regolo), though not the same one as in the Scottish legend. Due to persecution by the Arian Vandals in North Africa, the local Christian community dispersed, and together with Regulus, Felix, and some priests, Cerbonius escaped to Italy. After a storm at sea, they landed at Tuscany, where they lived as hermits. During the war raging currently in Italy between Byzantine and Gothic forces, Regulus was imprisoned and decapitated by the Goths after being accused of aiding the Byzantines.

After the death of the bishop of Populonia, Florentius (Fiorenzo), the citizens and clerics asked that Cerbonius serve as their bishop. The citizens soon became frustrated with him, however, since Cerbonius rose every Sunday at daybreak and said mass instead of doing so at the normal hour. The people complained to Pope Vigilius. Vigilius, on hearing what Cerbonius had done, became angry and sent legates to Piombino to bring the bishop to Rome. They found Cerbonius eating breakfast and accused him of heresy, believing that he was eating before performing mass, when in fact he had already performed the service.

They brought him back to Rome. During the way, he cured three men suffering from fever and tamed some wild geese by making the sign of the cross over them, which explains this particular attribute. The geese accompanied him to St. Peter's and flew off after Cerbonius made the sign of the cross over them again.

At Rome, the next morning at daybreak, Cerbonius went into the Pope's chamber and roused him out of bed. He then asked the Pope if he did not hear angels singing; Vigilius replied that he did hear anything of the kind. Cerbonius went off to say mass and Vigilius gave him leave to say his mass at any hour of the morning that pleased him, and sent him back to Piombino.

=== Encounter with Totila ===
For hiding several Roman soldiers, he was ordered to be killed by a wild bear by Totila, king of the Ostrogoths, during Totila's invasion of Tuscany. However, the bear remained petrified before Cerbonius. It stood on two legs and opened its jaws wide. Then, it fell back on its paws and licked the feet of Cerbonius. Totila exiled Cerbonius instead, to the island of Elba.

Around 575 AD, now old and sick, Cerbonius begged to be buried in Populonia. He asked, however, that those burying him should return immediately to Elba. His friends obeyed him. The ship carrying his body ran into a heavy storm, but arrived safely at Populonia. Cerbonius was buried and his followers returned quickly to Elba. Soon after, the Lombards seized Populonia; Cerbonius had foreseen this and had saved his friends.

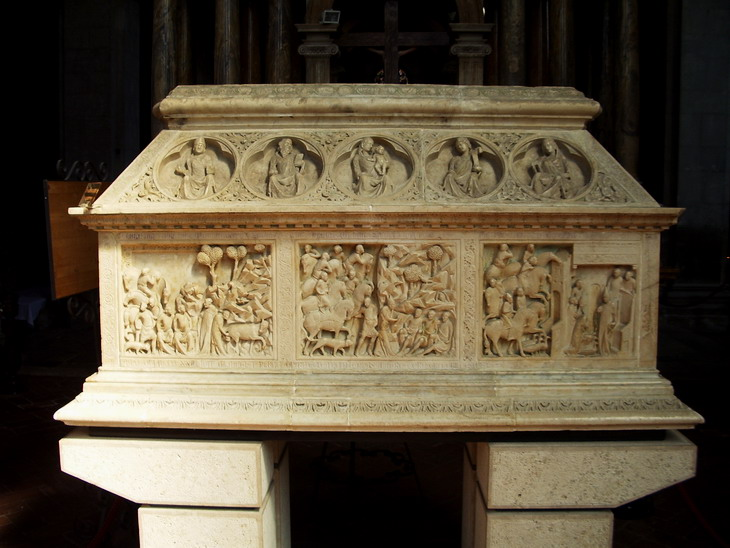
Sarcophagus of San Cerbone in Massa Marittima

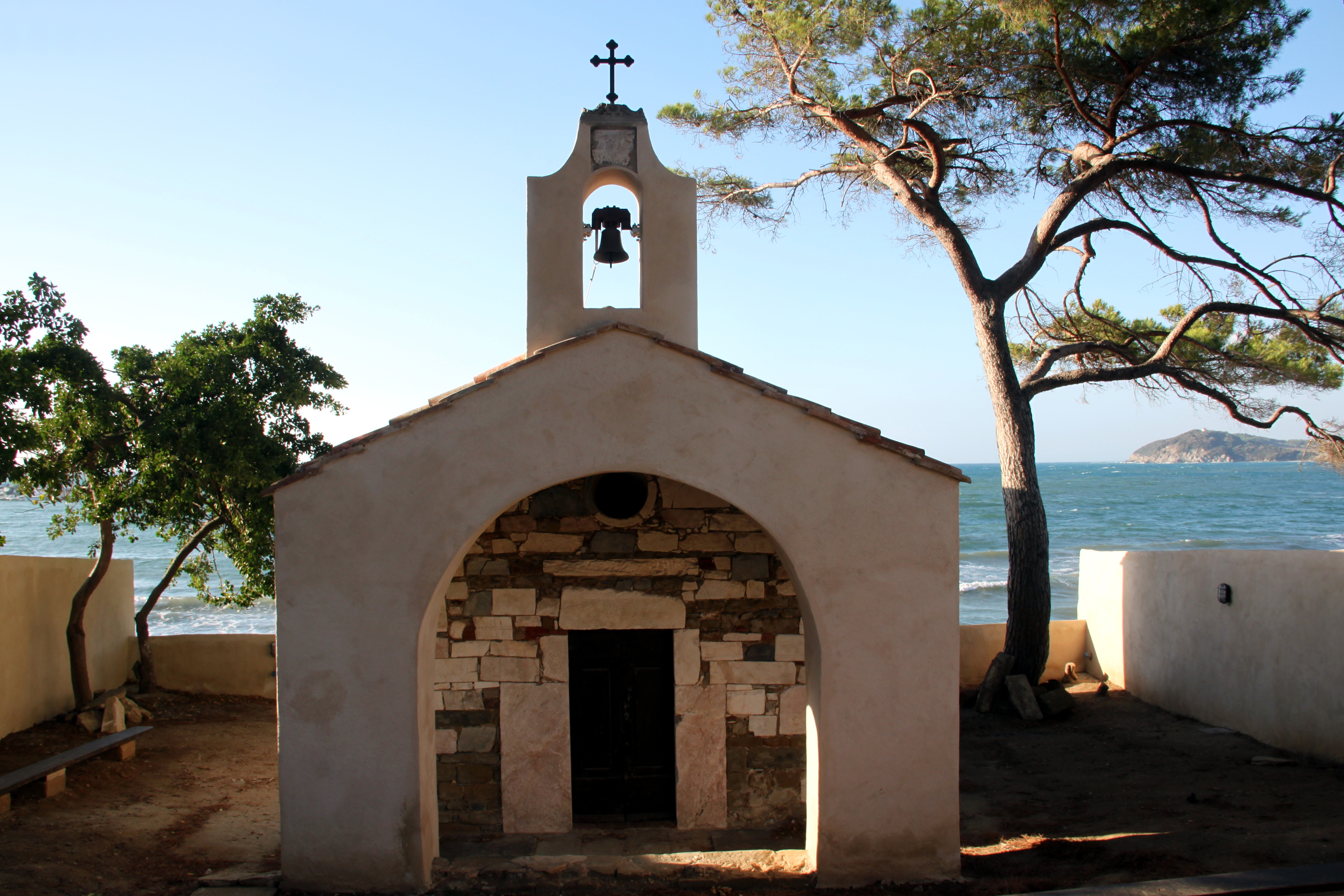
Saint Cerbonius chapel at Baratti

== Veneration ==
The 13th century cathedral at Massa Marittima a Gothic sarcophagus (1324) which supposedly is the tomb of Saint Cerbonius, to whom the cathedral is dedicated.

At Baratti, there is a fountain and chapel dedicated to Saint Cerbonius. A local proverb states: Chi non beve a San Cerbone - è un ladro o un birbone ("Whoever does not drink from the fountain of Saint Cerbonius – is a thief or a rascal.").

There is another Saint Cerbonius who is venerated at Verona.

== See also ==
- Massa Marittima Cathedral
