= Archdiocese of Pisa =

Metropolitan see of the Catholic Church in western Italy

Coordinates: 43.7233°N 10.3954°E

Archdiocese of Pisa Archidioecesis Pisana

Catholic
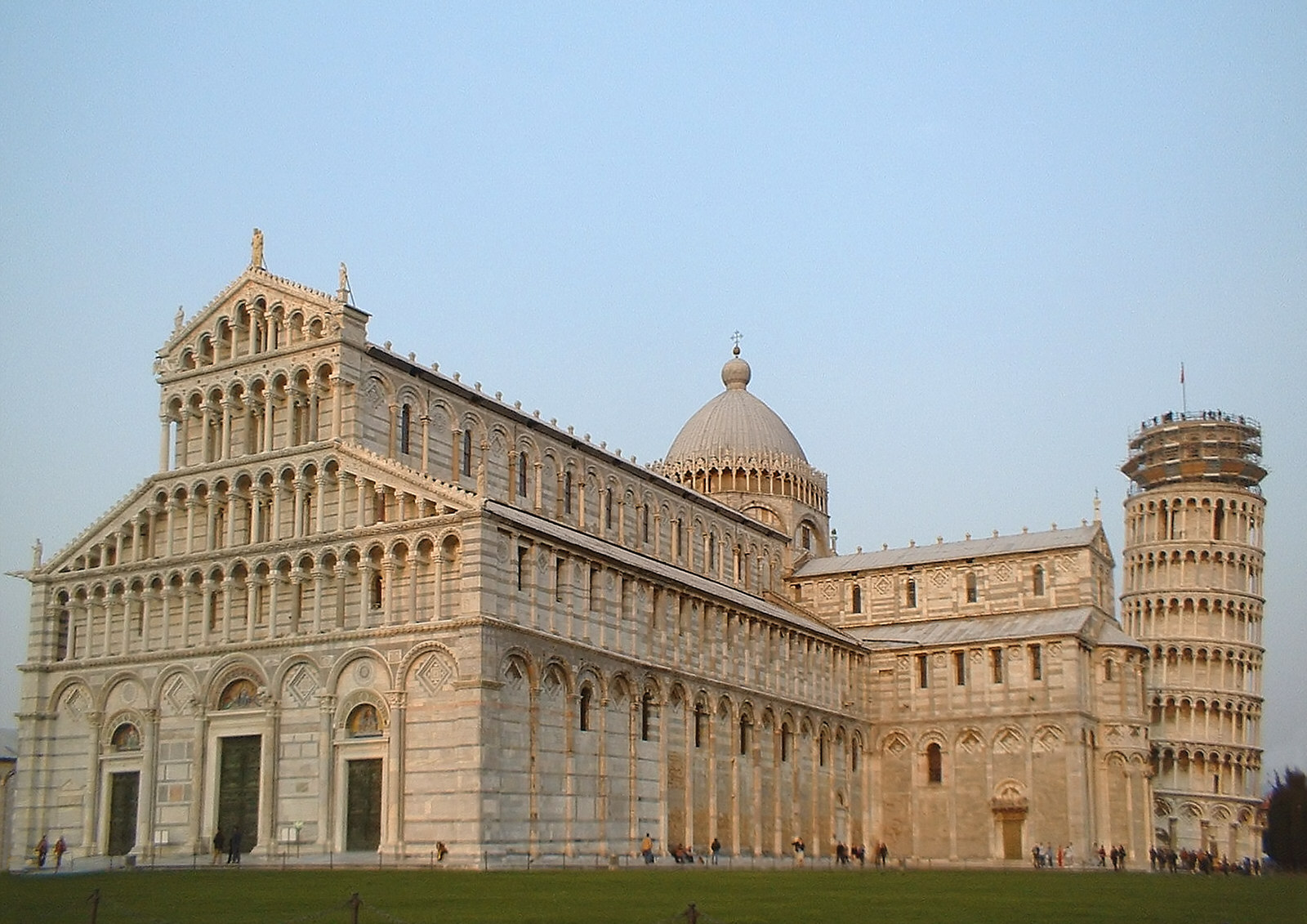
- Pisa Cathedral

Location
- Country: Italy
- Ecclesiastical province: Pisa

Statistics
- Area: 847 km^{2} (327 sq mi)
- Population: Total; Catholics: (as of 2016); 334,345; 313,497 (93.8%)
- Parishes: 166

Information
- Established: 4th century
- Cathedral: Pisa Cathedral (Cattedrale di S. Maria Assunta)
- Secular priests: 146 (diocesan); 44 (Religious Orders); 24 Permanent Deacons

Current leadership
- Pope: Leo XIV
- Archbishop-elect: Fr. Saverio Cannistrà, OCD
- Bishops emeritus: Giovanni Paolo Benotto

Map

Website
- www.diocesidipisa.it

The Archdiocese of Pisa (Latin: Archidioecesis Pisana) is a Latin Church metropolitan see of the Catholic Church in Pisa, Italy. It was founded in the 4th century and elevated to the dignity of an archdiocese on 21 April 1092 by Pope Urban II. The seat of the bishop is the cathedral of the Assumption in the Piazza del Duomo.

The archbishop of Pisa presides over the Ecclesiastical Province of Pisa, which includes the dioceses of Livorno, Massa Carrara-Pontremoli, Pescia, and Volterra.

In 2025, Pope Francis nominated Fr. Saverio Cannistrà, OCD, former superior general of the Order of Discalced Carmelites as archbishop of Pisa, replacing Giovanni Paolo Benotto, who has been archbishop since 2008.

== History ==
In a letter of 1 September 1077, Pope Gregory VII wrote to the bishops, clergy, civil leaders, and people of Corsica, acknowledging his responsibility for oversight of their well-being as part of the lands of S. Peter, but admitting that he was unable to do so personally and effectively. He had therefore appointed Bishop-elect Landulfus of Pisa to be his legate in Corsica. On 30 November 1078, Pope Gregory confirmed all the privileges that belonged to the Church of Pisa, as well as the legateship of Corsica. He granted the bishop half of all the papal income from the island, as well as all of the judicial income (de placitis). On 28 June 1091, Pope Urban II, at the request of Countess Matilda of Tuscany, Bishop Dagobert, and the nobility of Pisa, returned the legateship of the island of Corsica to Bishop Dagobert, on the condition of an annual payment of 50 pounds (Luccan) to the papal treasury.

On 21 April 1092, Pope Urban issued the bull "Cum Universis", in which he created the metropolitanate of Pisa, promoting the bishop to the rank of archbishop, and assigning the bishoprics of Corsica as his suffragans. This he did at the request of Countess Matilda of Tuscany and in consideration of the considerable merits of Bishop Dagibert in remaining faithful to the Roman church in the face of the schism against Pope Gregory VII. Pope Gelasius II, who was staying in Pisa from 2 September to 2 October 1118, confirmed the arrangements in a bull of 26 September 1118. After the death of Pope Gelasius at Cluny on 29 January 1119, Archbishop Petrus and Cardinal Petrus della Gherardesca dei Conti di Donoratico, a native of Pisa and papal legate, crossed to Corsica to receive to obtain the oaths of fealty of the bishops of Corsica.

Pope Gelasius' bull was an unpleasant shock for the Republic of Genoa, who coveted the island of Corsica, and a war broke out in 1119 between the two naval powers. The Genoese sent out a fleet of 28 galleys, but in a battle at Porto Venere the Pisans were victorious, as they were at a second battle at the mouth of the Arno River. The war lasted a total of fourteen years. On 16 May 1120, the new pope, Callixtus II, who had been elected at Cluny in France and had just returned to Italy, issued a bull confirming the privileges of Urban II and Gelasius II.

But on 3 January 1121, Pope Callixtus wrote to the bishops of Corsica that the privilege of consecrating bishops for Corsica, which had been granted to the archbishops of Pisa, was withdrawn, and that in the future only the pope would have the right to consecrate bishops for Corsica and to receive their oaths of submission. The Genoese were not mollified by his action. They resorted to bribery to obtain what they had not obtained by military force. A document, written in Rome and dated 16 June 1121, reveals that negotiations had been taking place, with the agreement and authorization of Pope Callixtus, between the Genoese agents, Caffaro and Barisone, and a committee of three cardinals and a bishop on the question of Corsica. The Genoese had agreed to give money to the Pope and other members of the Curia by 10 November. The Pope was to receive 1,600 silver marks; cardinals and bishops 300 marks; priests and clerics 50 ounces of gold; Cardinal Peter of Porto 303 ounces of gold; Petrus Leonis 100 silver marks, and his sons 55 marks; Leo Frangipane 40 marks; and additional payments to other nobles.

The opportune moment to satisfy the Genoans came when Callixtus II convened the First Lateran Council on 27 March 1123, to ratify the Concordat of Worms and end the schism instigated by the Emperor Henry V. The Pope appointed a committee, consisting of 24 bishops and other prelates, led by Archbishop Gualterius of Ravenna (a personal enemy of the Archbishop of Pisa), to examine and render a judgment on the claims of the Church of Pisa over Corsica. On 6 April, the last day of the council, the claims of Pisa were rejected by the Fathers, after the damning report of Archbishop Gualterius.

The loss was temporary, however, for, on 21 July 1126, the new pope, Honorius II, restored the privilege, and granted the archbishops the right of holding synods not only in Pisa, but also in Corsica. He took the trouble to rebuke Callixtus II and his committee, stating that the Pisans had been despoiled sine praecedente ipsorum Pisanorum culpa et absque iudicio ('without any preceding crime on the part of the Pisans and without a judicial hearing').

In 1127, Archbishop Ruggero, who had leagued himself with Arezzo and Florence, made war against Siena. He was taken prisoner, and spent more than a year in captivity.

On March 1133, Pope Innocent elevated the Diocese of Genoa to an archdiocese, and assigned it metropolitan status over Mariana, Nebbio, and Accia (on Corsica); Bobbio, and Brugnato (newly created), to which was added the diocese of Albenga, formerly in the Metropolitanate of Milan. The Pope also enfeoffed Genoa with the northern half of the island. The archdiocese of Pisa therefore lost ecclesiastical control of the northern half of the island of Corsica, retaining the dioceses of Ajaccio, Aleria, and Salona. Pisa was compensated, to a small degree, by being named Metropolitan of Populonia (Massa Maritima). These grants, which had been made to Archbishop Hubertus, were confirmed in the bull "Tunc Apostolicae" on 22 April 1138, and in addition Innocent II granted Pisa the honorary primacy of the province of Turritana. He also confirmed the legateship over Sardinia which had been granted by Urban II, and the right to consecrate the six bishops in his ecclesiastical province.

From the late 12th to the early 13th century, the Pisan archdiocese was the feudal suzerain of the four giudicati of Sardinia. On 6 March 1131, Gonnario of Torres swore fealty to Archbishop Ruggero of Pisa.

On 22 April 1459, Pope Pius II issued the bull "Triumphans Pastor", in which he raised the diocese of Siena to metropolitan status, and assigned to it as suffragans the dioceses of Soano, Chiusi, Massa Marittima (Populonia), and Grosseto. Massa was taken from the metropolitanate of Pisa.

=== Council of Pisa of Innocent II ===
From 30 May 1135 to 6 June 1135, Innocent II held a council in Pisa, having been driven from Rome a second time by the supporters of Pope Anacletus II. In Pisa, with the encouragement of Bernard of Clairvaux, who was travelling with him and supporting his cause, he summoned a council of bishops. The number of attendees is not known, but it is said that bishops from Spain, Gascony, England, France, Burgundy, Germany, Hungary, Lombardy, and Tuscany attended. Innocent II excommunicated his rival, Anacletus II, and all his followers. In the council, it was ordered that all clergy who had married should separate from their wives. It ordered all simoniacs to leave their offices. It ordered that no one should be an archdeacon or a dean who was not ordained a deacon or priest. Such honors should not be granted to adolescents. It granted the right of asylum to churches and cemeteries.

=== Schism ===
At the instigation of the German Emperor Frederick Barbarossa, a double election took place in St. Peter's Basilica in Rome on 7 September 1159, a considerable majority of cardinals supporting Pope Alexander III (Orlando Bandinelli), and a small minority supporting Ottaviano of Monticelli, who took the name Victor IV. The archbishop of Pisa, Villano Villani, supported Pope Alexander. In 1164, after the death of Victor, Barbarossa promoted Cardinal Guido of Crema as Paschal III. In 1167 Barbarossa began a fourth war in Italy, and he and his pope Paschal ordered the leaders of Pisa to elect an archbishop to replace the loyal Villano, who had already been sent into exile in 1163 and 1164, and was again in flight from imperial agents. On 8 April 1167, the leaders of Pisa, who were loyal to the Emperor, chose a Canon of the cathedral, Benencasa, and he and the Pisans travelled to Viterbo, where the antipope ordained him a priest on Holy Saturday and consecrated him a bishop on Easter Monday. They returned to Pisa on 23 May 1167.

=== General Council of Pisa ===
In the spring of 1408, Pisa became directly involved in the struggles of the Western Schism, which had been tormenting Christendom for thirty years. Gregory XII, who had been driven from Rome on 9 August 1407, was staying in Lucca, where, in May 1408, he created several new cardinals. He did this in violation of two solemn oaths he had taken, and without consulting the cardinals. When they objected and refused to attend the installation ceremonies, Gregory ordered them arrested. One by one the cardinals fled from Lucca, and sought refuge in Pisa. On 29 June 1408, thirteen cardinals (who held the proxies of two more cardinals) met at Livorno, in the diocese of Pisa, and issued a statement calling for a general council of the Church to address and end the schism. Their document was later subscribed by four additional cardinals. The Council of Pisa held its first session in the cathedral in Pisa on 25 March 1409. Archbishop Alamanno Adimari (1406–1411) was present. Both Gregory and Benedict XIII were deposed and excommunicated on 5 June 1409, having failed to answer repeated summonses from the council to answer the charges against them.

==== Papal conclave ====
Due to the deposition of both popes, a new pope was required. In examining the possibility of intervention or participation in the selection, the Council decided to leave the cardinals to their canonical duty in order to avoid any possible complaint. The cardinals in Pisa decided to wait the canonical ten days after the decease of a pope to begin their conclave, even though no pope had died. Twenty-three cardinals entered conclave, which was held in the archbishop's palace in the cathedral close, on 15 June 1411; they were joined by a twenty-fourth on 16 June. On 26 June, they elected unanimously the Cardinal of Milan, Pietro Filargi, OFM, who took the name Alexander V. He was crowned on 7 July 1411, on a platform erected in the square before the cathedral of Pisa.

=== Conciliabulum of Pisa ===
In 1511, at the instigation of King Louis XII of France, a meeting was held in Pisa, summoned by four cardinals led by Bernardino Carvajal, which called itself a general council. Others called it the conciliabulum Pisanum. Only two archbishops, fourteen bishops, and a number of French abbots attended. The "little council" held its first session on 5 November 1511. It attempted to take measures to depose Pope Julius II. The people of Pisa attempted to close the doors of the cathedral against the meeting, and their hostility, after three sessions, drove the bishops to adjourn their sessions to Milan, where they met on 13 December.

=== Chapter and cathedral ===
The cathedral of Pisa, begun in 1063 and consecrated by Pope Gelasius II in 1118, was dedicated originally to the Virgin as S. Maria (Maggiore), and then more specifically to the taking of the body of the Virgin Mary up into heaven (Assumption).

The cathedral was staffed and administered by a corporate body called the Chapter (Capitulum), which was originally composed of five dignities and (at one point) twenty-eight Canons. The dignities were: the Archpriest, the Archdeacon, the Dean, the Primicerius, and the Vicedominus. In 1702, there were only three dignities and twenty-five Canons.

=== Diocesan synods ===
Archbishop Matteo Rinuccini (1577–1582) presided over a diocesan synod in 1582. Archbishop Francesco Bonciani, (1613–1620) held a diocesan synod in Pisa in 1615 (1616, Pisan style).

Synods were also held by: Archbishop Giuliano de' Medici (1620–1635) in 1624 [1625, Pisan]; Archbishop Scipione Pannocchieschi (1636–1663) on 20–21 June 1639 and again in 1649 [1650, Pisan], and another in 1659; and Archbishop Francesco Pannocchieschi (1663–1702) on 11–12 May 1666, and again in 1677 [1678, Pisan].

Archbishop Francesco Frosini (1702–1733) held three diocesan synods: on 6–8 July 1707 [1708, Pisan); on 30–31 July 1716 [1717, Pisan]; and on 31 July 1725 [1726, Pisan].

A special assembly (conventus) was held in Pisa from 5–12 May 1850, summoned by Archbishop Giovanni Battista Parretti (1839–1851), and including his suffragan bishops (Pontremoli, Massa Maritima, Livorno), and, at his invitation, the archbishop of Lucca, the bishop of Pescia, and the vicar capitular of Volterra (which were immediately subject to the pope). Delegates of the various cathedral chapters were also invited. The meeting was occasioned by the revolution in Rome, which had deposed Pope Pius IX from his position as head of the Papal States and seen him flee from the city in disguise to a refuge in Neapolitan territory. The meeting was, in fact, sanctioned by Pope Pius.

=== New dioceses and suffragans ===
In a bull of 17 March 1726, Pescia was established as a diocese by Pope Benedict XIII, and was for a long time immediately subject to the Holy See (Papacy). On 1 August 1856, Pope Pius IX, in the bull "Ubi Primum", made Pescia a suffragan of (subordinate to) the archbishop of Pisa.

The diocese of Livorno was created by Pope Pius VII in the bull "Militantis Ecclesiae" of 25 September 1806, at the urging of Queen Maria Luisa, Regent of Tuscany. The erection was opposed both by the Archdiocese of Pisa and the Canons of San Miniato, who would lose territory, power, and income from the change. The new diocese was made a suffragan of the archbishop of Pisa.

== Bishops and archbishops ==
=== to 1200 ===
- Gaudentius (attested 313, 323)

...
Senior (or Senator) ? (410 ?)
...

- Joannes (attested 493)

...

- A bishop, name unknown, who took part in the schism of the Three Chapters (556)

...
[Alexius (648)]
...

- Opportunus (attested 649)
- Maurianus (attested 680)

...

- Maximus ? (attested 715 ?)

...

- Andreas (attested 754–768)
- Domnucianus (768-774)

...

- Raichnardus (attested 796–813)

...

- Joannes (attested 826–858)
- Plato (attested 865–876)
- Joannes (attested 877–902)
- Theodericus (attested 909–910)

...

- Wolfgherius (attested 927)

...

- Zenobius (attested 934–954)
- Grimaldus (attested 958–965)
- Albericus (attested 968–985)
- Raimbertus (attested 987–996)

...

- Wido (Guido) (attested 1005–1014)
- Azzo (1015–1031)
- Oppizo or Opizio (1039–1059)
- Guido (attested 1061–1076)
- Landulfus (attested 1077–1079)
- Gerardus (1080–1085)

Sede vacante (1085–1088)

Archbishops of Pisa (from 28 June 1091)

- Dagobert (1088–1105)
- Pietro Moriconi (1105–1119)
- Atto (Azzo) (1119–1121)
- Rogerio Ghisalbertini (1123–1131)
- Uberto Rossi Lanfranchi (1133–1137)
- Balduino da Pisa (1138–1145)
- Villano Villani (Gaetani) (1146–1175)
- Ubaldo Lanfranchi (1176–1207)

=== 1200 to 1500 ===
- Lotharius Rosari (1208–1216)
- Vitalis (1218? – 1252?)
- Federico Visconti (1254–1277)
- Ruggieri degli Ubaldini (1278–1295)
- Teodorico Ranieri (1295–1299) archbishop-elect
- Giovanni di Polo (1299–1312)
- Oddone della Sala (1312–1323))
- Simon Saltorelli, O.P. (1323–1342)
- Dino di Radicofani (1342–1348)
- Giovanni Scarlatti (1348–1362)
- Francesco Pucci (1362–1378)
- Barnaba Malaspina (1380)
- Lotto Gambacorta (1380–1394)
- Joannes Gabrieli (1394–1400)
- Ludovico Bonito (1400–1406)
- Alamanno Adimari (1406–1411)
- Pietro Ricci (1411–1417)
- Giuliano Ricci (1418–1461)
- Filippo de' Medici (1461–1474)
- Francesco Salviati (1475–1478)
- Rafaele Riario (1479–1499) Administrator
- Cesare Riario (1499–1518) Administrator

=== 1500 to 1800 ===
Cardinal Rafaele Riario (1518) Administrator

- Onofrio de' Bartolini (1518–1555)
- Giovanni Ricci
- Cardinal Scipione Rebiba (1556–1560)

Cardinal Giovanni de' Medici (1560–1562) Administrator

- Angelo Nicolini (1564–1567)
- Cardinal Giovanni Ricci (3 Sep 1567 – 3 May 1574)
- Pietro Giacomo Borbone (1574–1575)
- Ludovico Antinori (2 Dec 1575 – 13 Feb 1576)
- Bartolomeo Giugni (20 Feb 1576 – 26 June 1577)
- Matteo Rinuccini (14 Aug 1577 – 8 June 1582)
- Carlo Antonio Dal Pozzo (1582–1607),
- Sallustio Tarugi (1607–1613)
- Francesco Bonciani, (1613–1619)
- Giuliano de' Medici (1620–1635)
- Scipione Pannocchieschi (1636–1663)
- Francesco Pannocchieschi (1663–1702)
- Francesco Frosini (1702–1733)
- Francesco Guidi (1734–1778)
- Angelo Franceschi (1778–1806)

=== since 1800 ===
- Rainieri Alliata (1806–1836 Died)
- Giovanni Battista Parretti (1839–1851 Died)
- Cardinal Cosimo Corsi (1853–1870)
- Paolo Micallef (1871–1883)
- Ferdinando Capponi (1883–1903)
- Pietro Maffi (1903–1931)
- Gabriele Vettori (1932–1947)
- Ugo Camozzo (1948–1970)
- Benvenuto Matteucci (1971–1986)
- Alessandro Plotti (1986–2008)
- Giovanni Paolo Benotto (6 April 2008 – )

== See also ==
- Timeline of Pisa
- List of Catholic dioceses in Italy

== Books ==
- Gams, Pius Bonifatius (1873). Series episcoporum Ecclesiae catholicae: quotquot innotuerunt a beato Petro apostolo. Ratisbon: Typis et Sumptibus Georgii Josephi Manz. p. 761–762.
- Eubel, Conradus, ed. (1913). Hierarchia catholica (in Latin). Vol. Tomus I (second ed.). Münster: Libreria Regensbergiana.
- Eubel, Conradus, ed. (1914). Hierarchia catholica (in Latin). Vol. Tomus II (second ed.). Münster: Libreria Regensbergiana.
- Eubel, Conradus; Gulik, Guilelmus (1923). Hierarchia catholica (in Latin). Vol. Tomus III (second ed.). Münster: Libreria Regensbergiana.
- Gauchat, Patritius (Patrice) (1935). Hierarchia catholica (in Latin). Vol. Tomus IV (1592–1667). Münster: Libraria Regensbergiana.
- Ritzler, Remigius; Sefrin, Pirminus (1952). Hierarchia catholica medii et recentis aevi (in Latin). Vol. Tomus V (1667–1730). Patavii: Messagero di S. Antonio.
- Ritzler, Remigius; Sefrin, Pirminus (1958). Hierarchia catholica medii et recentis aevi. Vol. Tomus VI (1730–1799). Patavii: Messagero di S. Antonio.
- Ritzler, Remigius; Sefrin, Pirminus (1968). Hierarchia Catholica medii et recentioris aevi (in Latin). Vol. VII (1800–1846). Monasterii: Libreria Regensburgiana.
- Remigius Ritzler; Pirminus Sefrin (1978). Hierarchia catholica Medii et recentioris aevi (in Latin). Vol. VIII (1846–1903). Il Messaggero di S. Antonio.
- Pięta, Zenon (2002). Hierarchia catholica medii et recentioris aevi (in Latin). Vol. IX (1903–1922). Padua: Messagero di San Antonio. ISBN 978-88-250-1000-8.

=== Studies ===
- Cappelletti, Giuseppe (1861). Le chiese d'Italia (in Italian). Vol. Tomo decimosesto (16). Venezia: G. Antonelli. pp. 1–230.
- Caturegli, N. (1950). "Le condizioni della chiesa di Pisa nella seconda metà del secolo XV," Bollettino Storico Pisano 19 (1950). (in Italian)
- Ceccarelli Lemut, Maria Luisa; Sodi, Stefano (2004). "I vescovi di Pisa dall'età carolingia all' inizio del XIII secolo." In: Rivista di storia della Chiesa in Italia Vol. 58, No. 1 (2004), pp. 3–28. (in Italian)
- Ceccarelli Lemut, Maria Luisa. (2011). "Le canoniche della diocesi di Pisa nell'età della riforma della Chiesa." In: Studi Waldo Dolfi, pp. 95–122. (in Italian)
- Ceccarelli Lemut, Maria Luisa. Sodi Stefano (2017). La chiesa di Pisa dalle origini alla fine del Duecento. Edizioni ETS. (in Italian)
- Ceccarelli Lemut M Luisa. Sodi Stefano (2018). I Canonici della Cattedrale Pisana. Genesi e Sviluppo Dell'Istituzione Canonicale Sino alla Fine del Duecento Pisa: Edizioni ETS. (in Italian)
- Heywood, William (1921). A History of Pisa, Eleventh and Twelfth Centuries. Cambridge: The University Press. p. 13.
- Kehr, Paul Fridolin (1908). Italia pontificia. vol. III. Berlin 1908. pp. 316–384. (in Latin)
- Lanzoni, Francesco (1927), Le diocesi d'Italia dalle origini al principio del secolo VII (an. 604), Faenza 1927, pp. 584–586. (in Italian)
- Matthaeius (Mattei), Antonius (1768). Ecclesiae Pisanae historia (in Latin). Vol. Tomus I. Lucca: Venturini.
- Matthaeius (Mattei), Antonius (1772). Ecclesiae Pisanae historia (in Latin). Vol. Tomus II. Venturini.
- Picotti, Giovanni Battista (1946), "I vescovi pisani del secolo IX," Miscellanea Giovanni Mercati. Studi e testi (Biblioteca apostolica vaticana), 125 (in Italian). Vol. V. Citta del Vaticano. 1946. pp. 206–217.
- Picotti, Giovanni Battista (1966), "Osservazione sulla datazione dei documenti privati pisani dell'alto medioevo, con uno studio sulla cronologia dei vescovi pisani del secolo IX," Bollettino Storico Pisano 33–35 (1964–1966), pp. 3–80. (in Italian)
- Schwartz, Gerhard (1913), Die Besetzung der Bistümer Reichsitaliens unter den sächsischen und salischen Kaisern : mit den Listen der Bischöfe, 951–1122, Leipzig-Berlin 1913, pp. . (in German)
- Ughelli, Ferdinando (1718). Italia sacra sive De Episcopis Italiae, et insularum adjacentium (in Latin). Vol. Tomus Tertius (III) (Secunda ed.). Venice: apud Sebastianum Coleti. pp. 341–493.
- Violante, Cinzio (1970). "Cronotassi dei vescovi e degli arcivescovi di Pisa dalle origini all'inizio del secolo XIII. Primo contributo ad una nuova "Italia Sacra". In: Miscellanea Gilles Gérard Meersseman. Padova, 1970. (in Italian)
- Violante, C. "Le concessioni ponteficie alla Chiesa di Pisa riguardanti la Corsica alla fine del secolo XI", Bullettino dell'Istituto Storico Italiano per il Medio Evo 75 (1963), pp. 43–56. (in Italian)
- Zucchelli, N. (1906). Appunti e documenti per la storia del Seminario arcivescovile di Pisa. Pisa 1906. (in Italian)
- Zucchelli, Niccola (1907). Cronotassi dei vescovi e arcivescovi di Pisa (in Italian). Pisa: Tipografia Arcivescovile Orsolini-Prosperi.
