= Alessandro Plotti =

Italian prelate

Alessandro Plotti (8 August 1932 – 19 October 2015) was an Italian prelate of the Catholic Church who served as Archbishop of Pisa from 1986 to 2007.

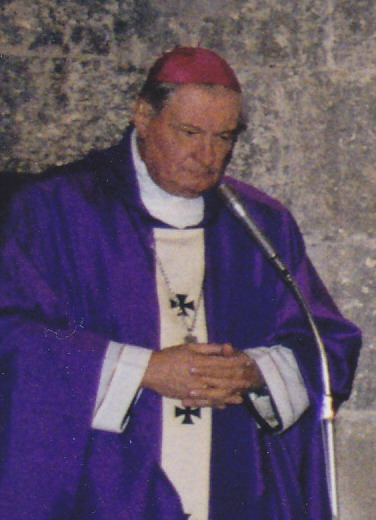
Alessandro Plotti

Coat of arms of Alessandro Plotti

He was born in Bologna and ordained a priest on 25 July 1959. Plotti was named auxiliary Bishop of Rome on 23 December 1980 and consecrated on 6 January 1981 by Pope John Paul II. On 7 June 1986 he was named Archbishop of Pisa and he was installed there on 17 July.

He was vice president of the Italian Bishops' Conference from 2000 to 2005.

Pope Benedict XVI accepted his resignation on 2 February 2008.

On 12 May 2012, Benedict named him Apostolic Administrator of Trapani, a post he held until 3 November 2013.

He died on 19 October 2015 in the Gemelli Polyclinic in Rome.
