= Comacine masters =

Early medieval Lombard stonemasons

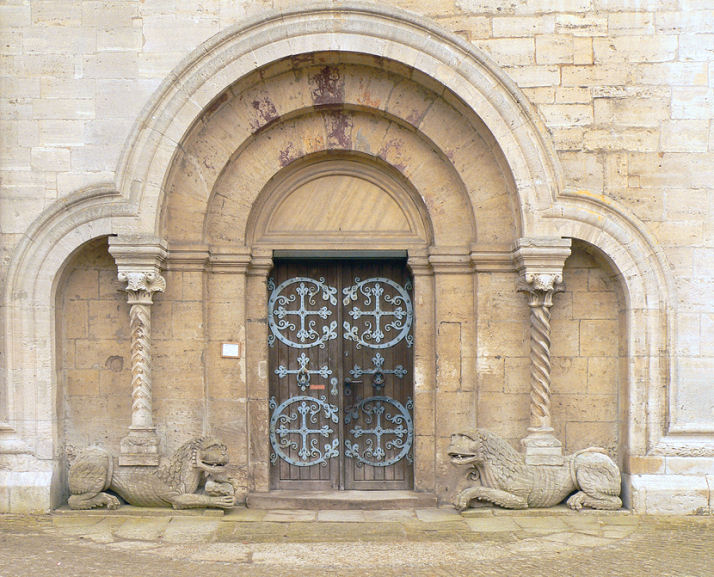
Lion portal at the monastery church (Kaiserdom) in Königslutter

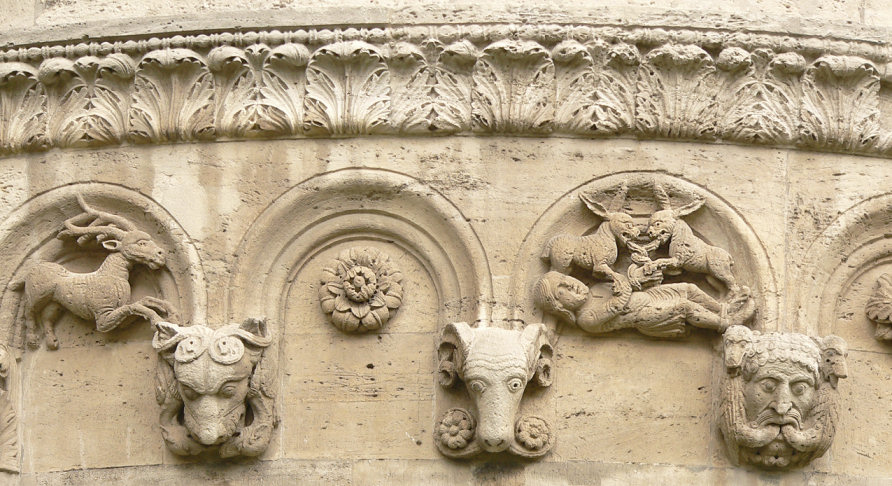
Portion of the carvings of the choir apsis of the church at Königslutter

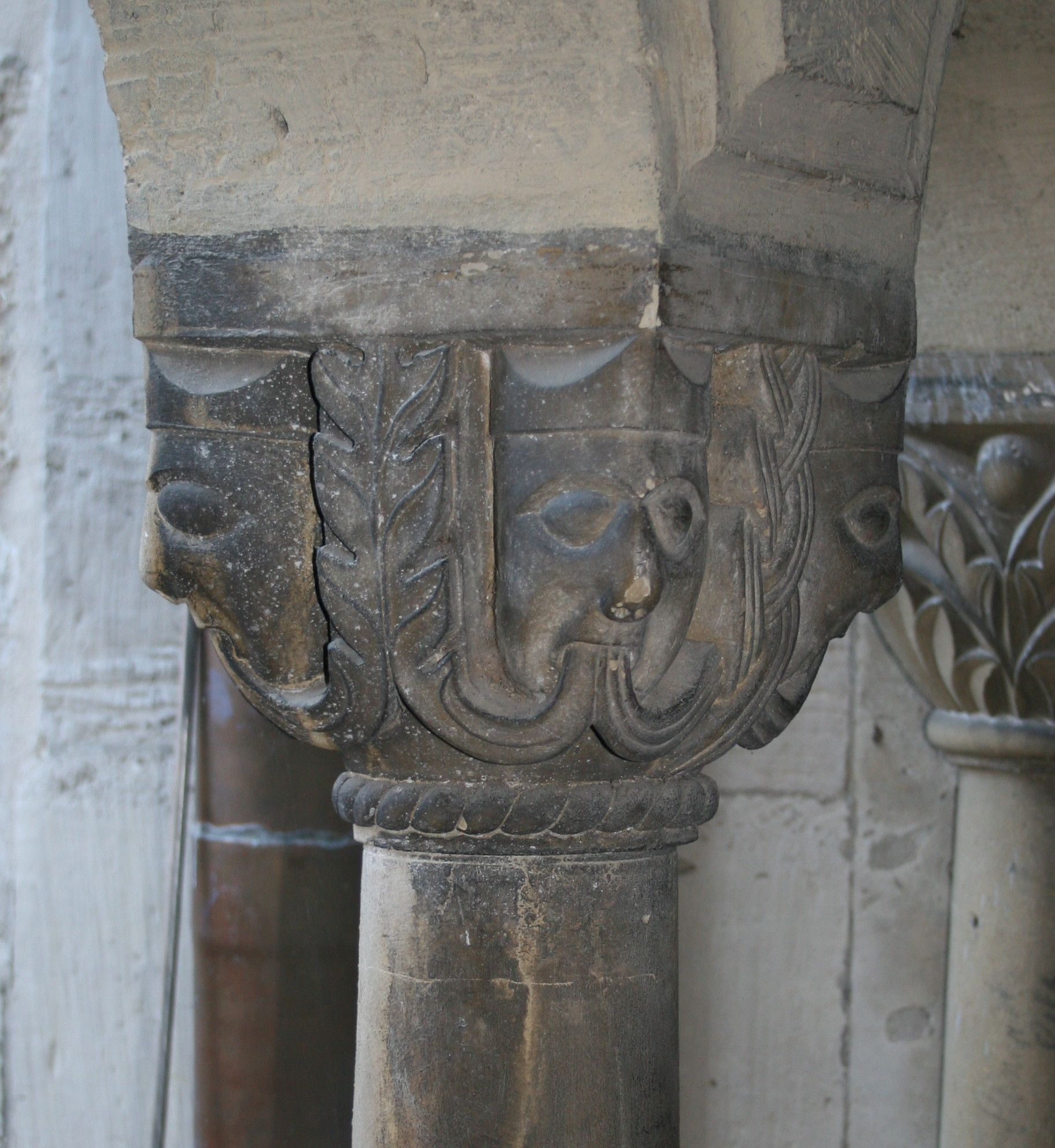
Capital of a pillar in the transept of the church of Königslutter

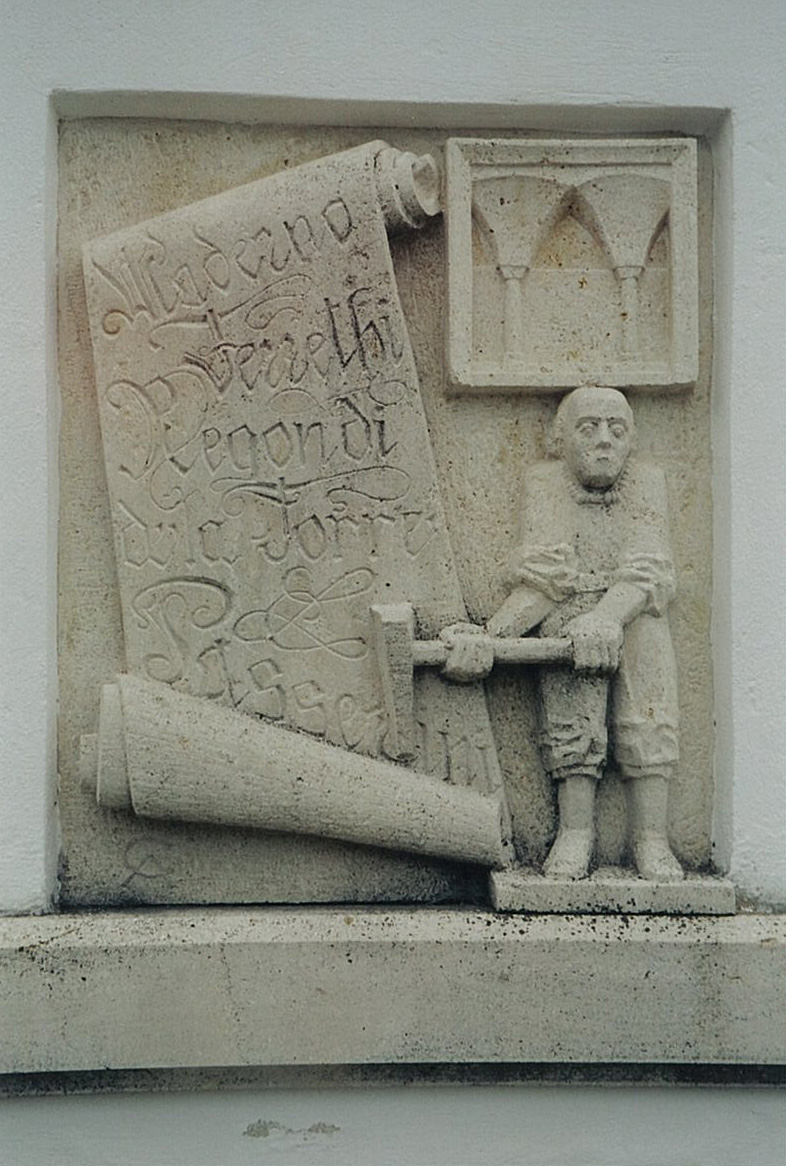
Stone relief carving of the Italian Master in Kaisersteinbruch. Scroll with the names Maderno, Ferrethi, Regondi, della Torre and Passerini, while to the upper right is a quotation from Neugebäude Castle.

The Comacine masters (magistri comacini) were early medieval Lombard stonemasons working in a region of excellent building stone who gave to Lombardy its preeminence in the stone architecture that preceded Romanesque style.

== Comacini ==
Their masons' marks have suggested arcane meanings for some enthusiasts. The name comacini Romantic historians of the nineteenth century traced to the location where they supposedly had their headquarters, the minute Isola Comacina in Lake Como, alleged to have been a safe haven during the Lombard invasion; a more inventive etymology derives from a supposed Latin expression cum machinis, referring to their tools.

The first mention of Comacine masters was in an edict of 643 of the Lombard king Rothari, which concerned itself in Lombard fashion mainly with the indemnity that would be due should a house collapse which had been built by a magister comacinus for a patron ad opera dictandi ("commissioning the works"). The reference has been interpreted as granting certain privileges to magistri comacini, but the context shows that modern readers are correct in interpreting the key word comacini simply as "masons". Comacini are also mentioned in a passage in the Memoratorium of Liutprand the Lombard.

The survival of brotherhoods of the comacini are based on the hypothesis that the Roman secrets of masonry construction were never utterly lost in Italy but were passed on by the mason brotherhoods, which were supposed to be among the numerous documented collegia in which workingmen joined together for mutual protection, fraternal banqueting and eventual support of their widows throughout the Roman Empire, sometimes associated together as masters of the arcana or "mysteries" of their craft. Each such confraternity was composed of men (never women) located in a single town, and was made up of men of a single craft or those worshipping a single deity, free, freedmen and slaves together, forming a bond very like the image of a city, always under the uneasy surveillance of officialdom. Such, it supposed, were the comacini whose geographical center in the Early Middle Ages originated in Lombardy, in Como and Pavia.

If mason's marks were the sign of the comacini, then evidence of their work has been found in several parts of Europe, as far as the capitals of the crypt in the cathedral of Lund. The "Como-Pavian" architectural sculpture is recognized in the cathedral of Modena and its Torre della Ghirlandina, in central and southern Italy, west across Languedoc to Iberian Peninsula, across southern Germany as far as Hungary, and even in England.

In the Middle Ages, artists did not customarily sign their work, so to detect the work of this corporation, historians look to masons' marks inscribed in the stonework; in this way historians have traced comacine master's influence as far as Sweden and Syria. Freemasons claimed descent from the guilds of comacini.

The efflorescence of a "Como-Pavian" school of sculptural decoration on pulpits and portals that surfaced in the area of Como in the late eleventh century and developed luxuriously to enrich facades in Pavia in the 1130s, then were disseminated more widely in the twelfth and thirteenth century, doubtless by travelling groups of artisans, is traditionally ascribed to a surfacing of a long-buried tradition of comacini sculptors, who were influenced by the animal interlaces of Lombard metalwork. In this corrente comasca that spread on the periphery of Romanesque and Early Gothic art, geometric interlaces are peopled with sleek monsters and figures that seem to synthesize some very disparate and distant influences: barbaric Longobard metalwork, Ottonian illuminations, Byzantine silk patterns, Islamic patterning, Coptic reliefs, have all been compared to the "Como-Pavian" current of sculpture.

Another notable group of medieval stoneworkers were maestri Campionesi from Campione, not far from Como.
