= Guglielmo Borghetti =

Italian Catholic bishop

His Excellency, The Most Reverend Guglielmo Borghetti
- Bishop of Albenga-Imperia
- Diocese: Diocese of Albenga-Imperia
- Appointed: 10 January 2015
- Installed: 25 March 2015
- Predecessor: Mario Oliveri
- Previous post: Bishop of Pitigliano-Sovana-Orbetello (2010–2015)

Orders
- Ordination: 17 October 1982 by Aldo Forzoni
- Consecration: 15 September 2010 by Mario Meini

Personal details
- Born: 25 March 1954 (age 72) Avenza, Carrara, Tuscany
- Denomination: Roman Catholic
- Motto: Evangelium servire pro mundi spe English: Serve the Gospel for the hope of the world

Styles of Guglielmo Borghetti
- Reference style: His Excellency; The Most Reverend
- Spoken style: Your Excellency
- Religious style: Bishop

Ordination history of Guglielmo Borghetti
History
Priestly ordination
- Ordained by: Aldo Forzoni
Episcopal consecration
- Principal consecrator: Mario Meini (Fiesole)
- Co-consecrators: Giovanni Santucci; Eugenio Binini

Guglielmo Borghetti (born 25 March 1954) is an Italian ordinary of the Catholic Church and the current Bishop of Albenga-Imperia. He is the former Bishop of Pitigliano-Sovana-Orbetello.

== Biography ==
=== Early life and education ===
Guglielmo Borghetti was born on 25 March 1954 in the frazione of Avenza, a hamlet of Carrara, which is a comune of Tuscany, Italy. After attending the Liceo Classico Emanuele Repetti in Carrara, he studied at the University of Pisa where he earned a degree in philosophy and at the Salesian Pontifical University where he earned a bachelor of arts in psychology. Following this, he entered the seminary and studied theology.

=== Priestly ministry ===
Borghetti was ordained a priest on 17 October 1982 in the Massa Cathedral by Bishop Aldo Forzoni.

Borghetti eventually became the vice chancellor and then rector of the diocesan seminary of the Diocese of Massa-Carrara-Pontremoli and a parish priest of the Massa Cathedral. By 1993, he was the spiritual director of the seminary and the director of the diocese's office for vocations. From 1993 to 1996, he served as the episcopal vicar. In 1997, he became a priest in the parish of Santa Maria della Rosa in Montignoso. He then became the dean of the Msgr. Enrico Bartoletti Inter-diocesan Theological Study (Italian: Studio Teologico Interdiocesano "Mons. Enrico Bartoletti") in Camaiore.

On 1 March 1996, Borghetti was bestowed by Pope John Paul II the title Chaplain of His Holiness, which grants the pre-nominal honorific of "Monsignor."

With the support and authorization of the bishops of the Inter-diocesan Theological Study, he founded in 2002 the Institute for the Study and Research of Pastoral Counseling (Italian: l'Istituto Studi e Ricerche di Pastoral Counseling). The institute, in addition to providing a counseling service to those in consecrated life, it operates a three-year training school in pastoral counseling for pastoral workers. Its headquarters and operations are in Camaiore.

Borghetti also served as chaplain to Catholic physicians of the Diocese of Massa-Carrara-Pontremoli, as canon of the Cathedral Basilica of Massa, and has authored several articles in Catholic magazines. He has also served as a lecturer in psychology of personality at the Edith Stein School in Savona, whose purpose is the formation of educators in the ecclesiastical community.

On 13 June 2009, Borghetti received his investiture as a knight into the Equestrian Order of the Holy Sepulchre of Jerusalem. At the same time, he became the chaplain of the Diocese of Massa-Carrara-Pontremoli delegation.

=== Episcopal ministry ===
On 25 June 2010, Pope Benedict XVI appointed Borghetti Bishop of Pitigliano-Sovana-Orbetello. He succeeded Mario Meini, who was previously named Bishop of Fiesole. He received his episcopal consecration on 15 September 2010 in the Massa Cathedral and took the Latin motto "evangelium servire pro mundi spe," which translates to "serve the Gospel for the hope of the world." The principal consecrator was Mario Meini and the co-consecrators were Bishops Giovanni Santucci and Eugenio Binini. He was installed on 26 September of that year. His appointment as bishop elevated him to the rank of Grand Officer of the Order of the Holy Sepulchre.

From 19 November 2012 to 10 August 2013 Borghetti also served as apostolic administrator of the Diocese of Grosseto.

On 10 January 2015, Pope Francis appointed him Coadjutor Bishop of Albenga-Imperia, granting him upon entrance into the diocese in accordance with canon 381 of the Code of Canon Law the powers as diocesan ordinary of the full and effective leadership of the diocese in place of Bishop Mario Oliveri; Oliveri retained the title of Bishop of Albenga-Imperia but without any ordinary powers. On 25 March, Borghetti was installed in his office in the chapel of the Albenga Episcopal Seminary.

On 21 November 2015, he acted as principal co-consecrator of Giovanni Roncari, who succeeded him as Bishop of Pitigliano-Sovana-Orbetello. Borghetti officially became Bishop of Albenga-Imperia on 1 September 2016.

== Honors ==

- Knight of the Equestrian Order of the Holy Sepulchre of Jerusalem (13 June 2009)
- Grand Officer of the Equestrian Order of the Holy Sepulchre of Jerusalem (25 June 2010)

== Works ==
- Educare. Per una pienezza di vita. 2nd ed. Edizioni Del Delfino Moro, 2015. ISBN 8888397191.
- (English: Educate. For a fullness of life)

Catholic Church titles
Preceded by Mario Meini	Bishop of Pitigliano-Sovana-Orbetello; 2010–2015	Succeeded by Giovanni Roncari
Preceded by Franco Agostinelli	Apostolic Administrator of Grosseto; 2012–2013	Succeeded by Rodolfo Cetoloni
Preceded by Mario Oliveri	Bishop of Albenga-Imperia; 2016–Present	Incumbent
