= Luciano Giovannetti (bishop) =

Italian Roman Catholic bishop (1934–2024)

His Excellency, The Most Reverend Luciano Giovannetii
- Bishop Emeritus of Fiesole
- Metropolis: Florence
- Diocese: Fiesole (Emeritus)
- Appointed: 27 May 1981
- Installed: 6 September 1981
- Term ended: 13 February 2010
- Predecessor: Simone Scatizzi
- Successor: Mario Meini
- Other post: President of the John Paul II Foundation
- Previous posts: Auxiliary Bishop of Arezzo (1978–1981); Titular Bishop of Zaba (1978–1981)

Orders
- Ordination: 15 June 1957
- Consecration: 8 April 1978 by Telesforo Giovanni Cioli

Personal details
- Born: 26 July 1934 Civitella in Val di Chiana, Italy
- Died: 29 June 2024 (aged 89) Arezzo, Italy
- Motto: In Luce Christi; Latin: In the Light of Christ
- Coat of arms: Luciano Giovannetii's coat of arms

Ordination history of Luciano Giovannetti
History
Episcopal consecration
- Principal consecrator: Telesforo Giovanni Cioli
- Co-consecrators: Giuseppe Franciolini; Angelo Scapecchi

Styles of Luciano Giovannetti
- Reference style: His Excellency; The Most Reverend
- Spoken style: Your Excellency
- Religious style: Bishop

Luciano Giovannetti (26 July 1934 – 29 June 2024) was an Italian ordinary of the Catholic Church and the Bishop Emeritus of Fiesole. He was until his death president of the John Paul II Foundation for Dialogue, Cooperation and Development.

== Biography ==
Luciano Giovannetti was born on 26 July 1934 in Civitella in Val di Chiana, a comune in the Tuscan province of Arezzo.

He was ordained a priest on 15 June 1957 in Arezzo and on 15 February 1978 was simultaneously the Auxiliary Bishop of Arezzo and the Titular Bishop of the Diocese of Zaba. He was consecrated a bishop on 8 April of that year. The principal consecrator was Telesforo Giovanni Cioli, the Bishop of Cortona, and the principal co-consecrators were Giuseppe Franciolini, Coadjutor Bishop of Arezzo, and Angelo Scapecchi, Titular Bishop of Vicohabentia.

On 27 May 1981, Giovannetti was appointed the Bishop of Fiesole and was installed on 6 September 1981, succeeding Simone Scatizzi. He acted as principal co-consecrator of Rodolfo Cetoloni in 2000. He assumed emeritus status on 13 February 2010 and was succeeded by Mario Meini.

Giovannetti was at the time of his death president of the John Paul II Foundation for Dialogue, Cooperation and Development. He was also the Grand Prior for Central Apennine of the Equestrian Order of the Holy Sepulchre of Jerusalem.

Giovannetti died on 29 June 2024, at the age of 89.

== See also ==
- Catholic Church in Italy

Catholic Church titles
| Preceded by Simone Scatizzi | Bishop of Fiesole; 1981–2010 | Succeeded by Mario Meini |
| Preceded by Cirilo R. Almario | Titular Bishop of Zaba; 1978–1981 | Succeeded by Anton Pain Ratu |
