= Church of Santa Maria Primerana =

- Chiesa di Santa Maria Primerana (Italian)
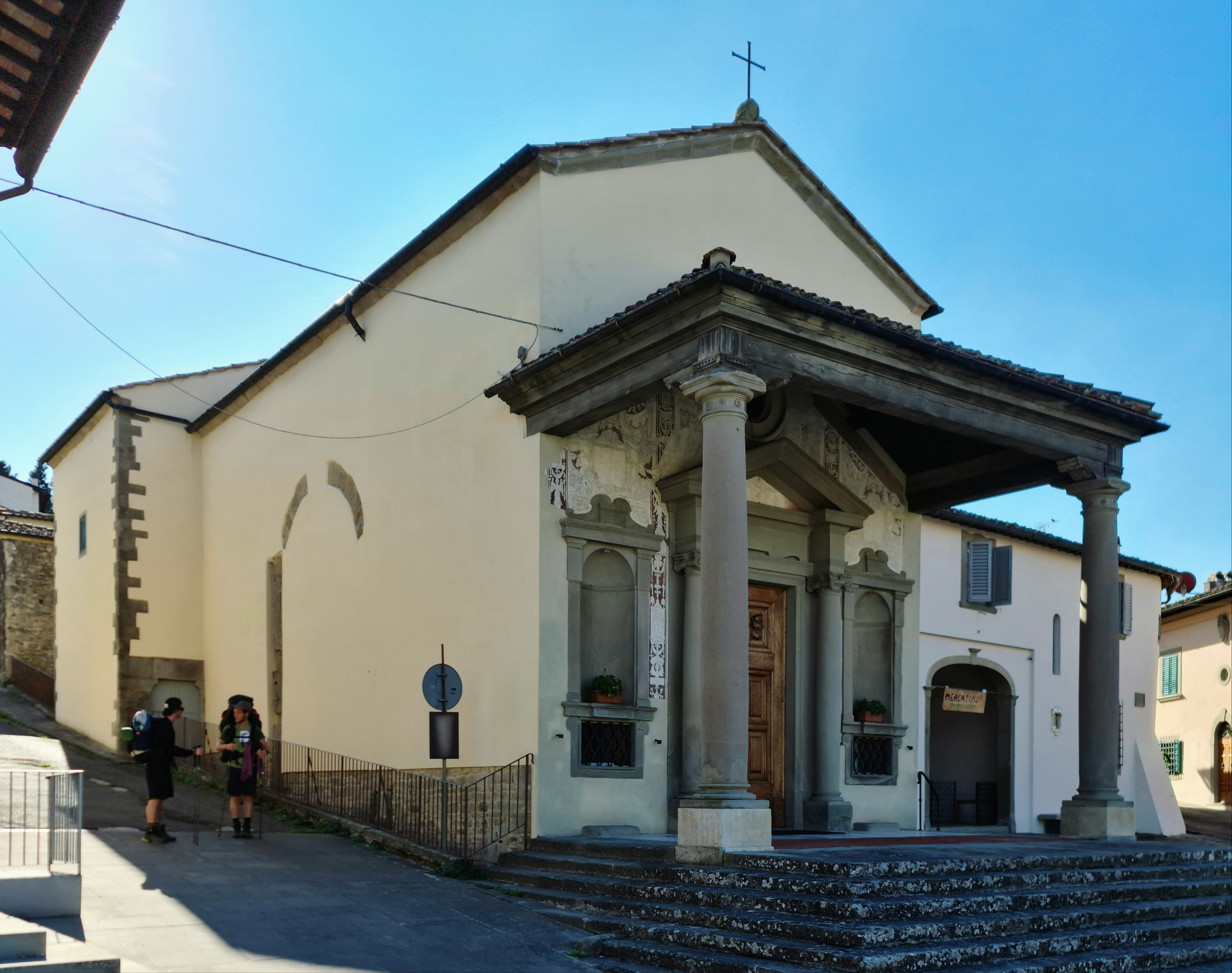
- Front façade of the church
- Church of Santa Maria Primerana
- 43.8064°N 11.2935°E
- Location: Fiesole, Tuscany
- Country: Italy
- Denomination: Catholic Church

History
- Founded: AD 966
- Dedication: Saint Mary

Architecture
- Style: Gothic & Mannerist

Administration
- Diocese: Diocese of Fiesole

The Church of Santa Maria Primerana (Italian: Chiesa di Santa Maria Primerana) is a Roman Catholic church located in the Tuscan town of Fiesole. It encloses the eastern end of Piazza Mino, next to the Praetorian Palace.

== History ==
First mentioned in AD 966, the church was built atop the stylobate of a Roman temple, from which a pietra serena pillar was incorporated into the church's north wall. There is also a Roman decumanus running north–south that flanks the church. Moreover, findings of nearby Lombard sepulchres indicates that the church was once an early Christian site. The church occupies a prominent position in Piazza Mino, near the Fiesole Cathedral. Due to an image inside of the Virgin Mary it appears that the church is the site of the oldest instance of veneration of the Madonna in the Diocese of Fiesole, which would form the basis for "Primerana" in the church's name.

Santa Maria Primerana was expanded in the Middle Ages. From this period, the Gothic chancel remains. A new façade was built at the end of the 16th century in the Mannerist style. The interior was decorated with sgraffito decor by Ludovico Buti.

The portico, which is constituted by an architrave supported by columns of the Ionic order, dates to 1801.

The interior consists of a single transept room. The high altar was constructed between 1745 and 1767 by Bernardino Ciruini. On the altar is a 13th-century tablet by Maestro di Rovezzano, which depicts the Madonna and Child.

In the transept are two marble bas-reliefs by Francesco da Sangallo. One dates to 1542 and is a Self-portrait of the artist; the other dates to 1575 and is a Portrait of Francesco del Fede. Also in the transept is a glazed terracotta from Andrea della Robbia's workshop depicting the Crucifix between the Madonna, St. John, Mary Magdalene and Angels. There is, additionally, a large, painted, wooden crucifix designed in the Giotto school from the 14th-century, which is attributed to Bonaccorso di Cino.

The faded remains of frescoes on the walls are by Niccolò di Pietro Gerini.

== Image gallery ==
Architecture
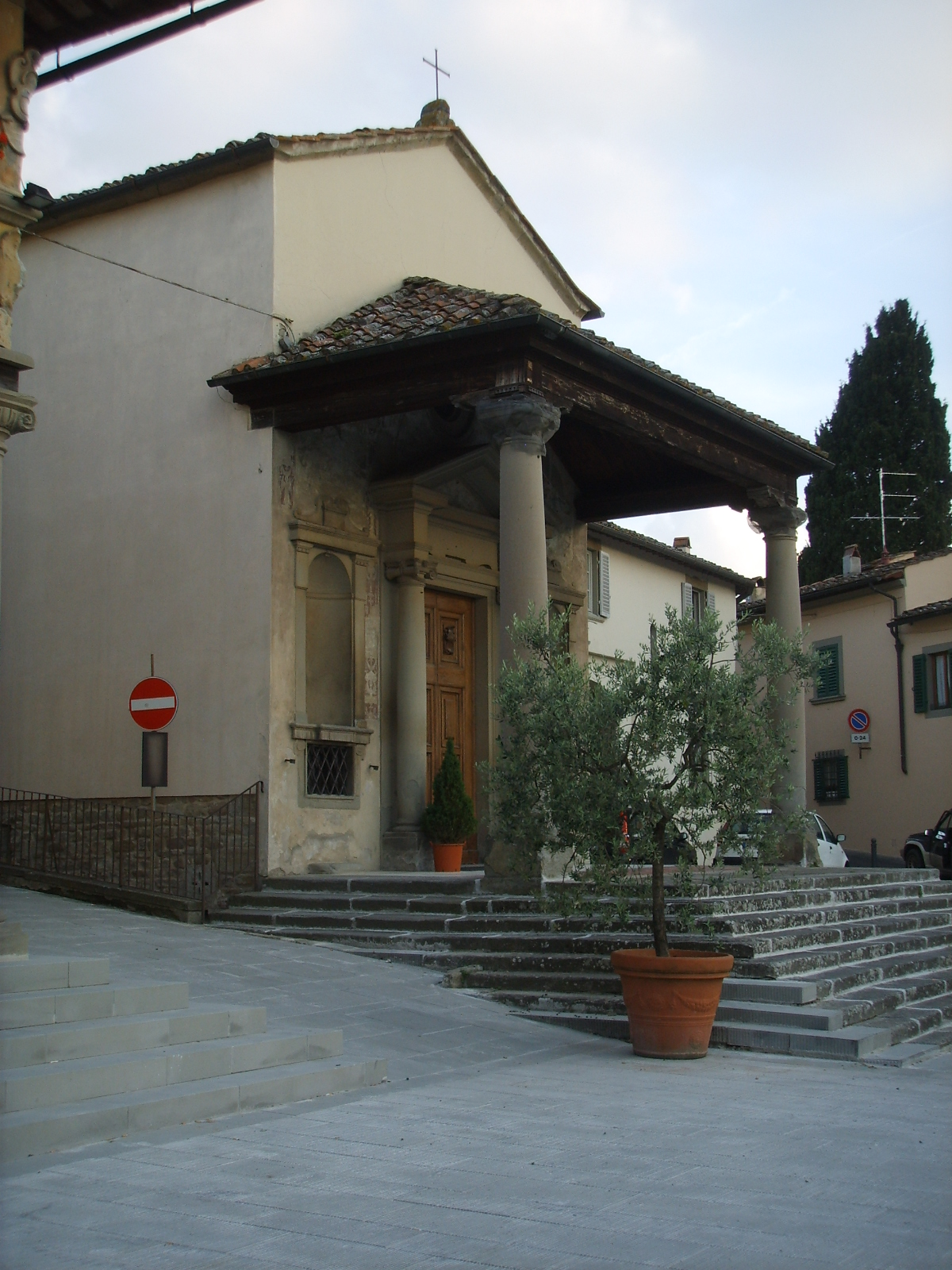
Northwestern corner of the façade

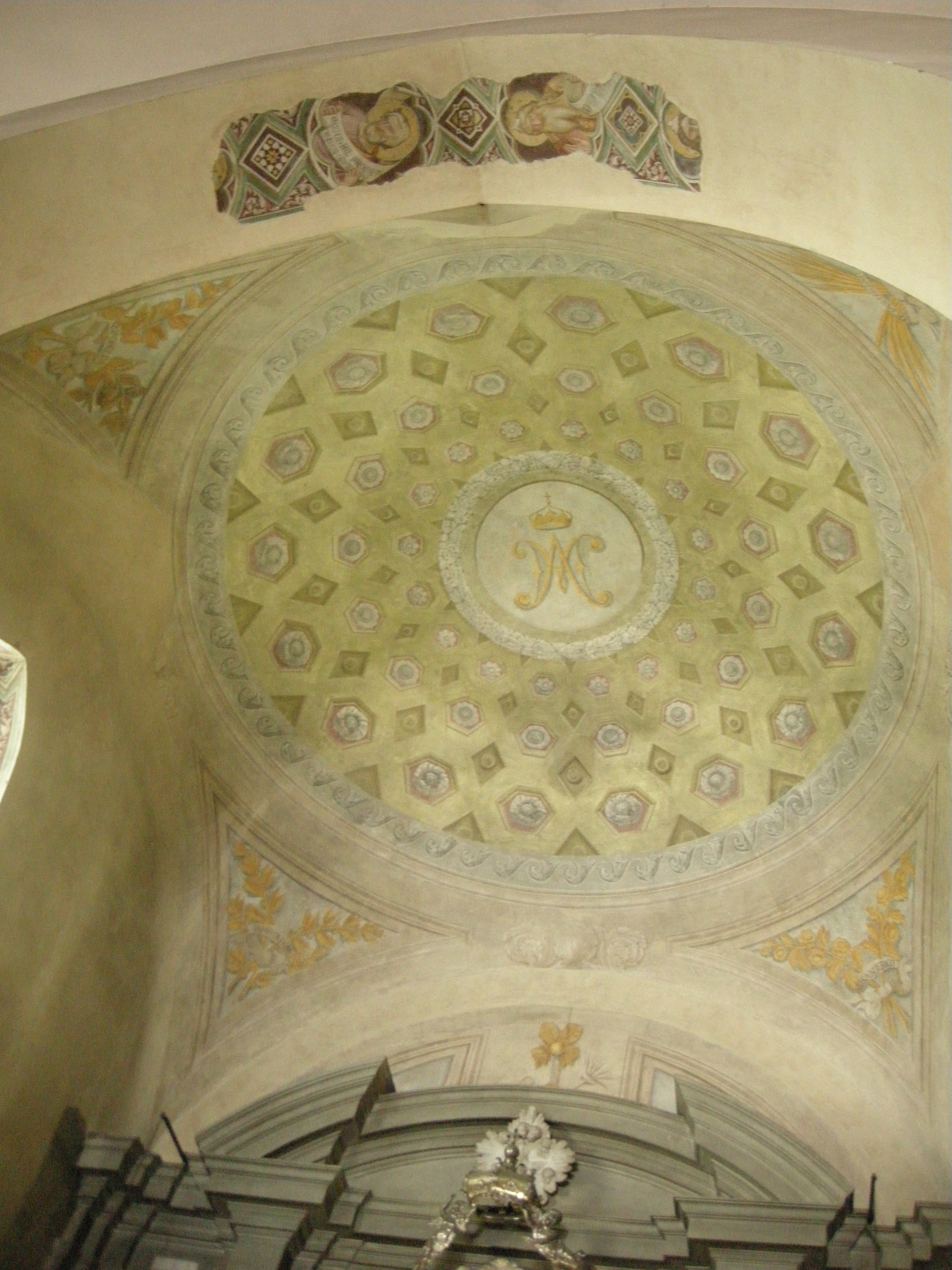
Dome above the chancel

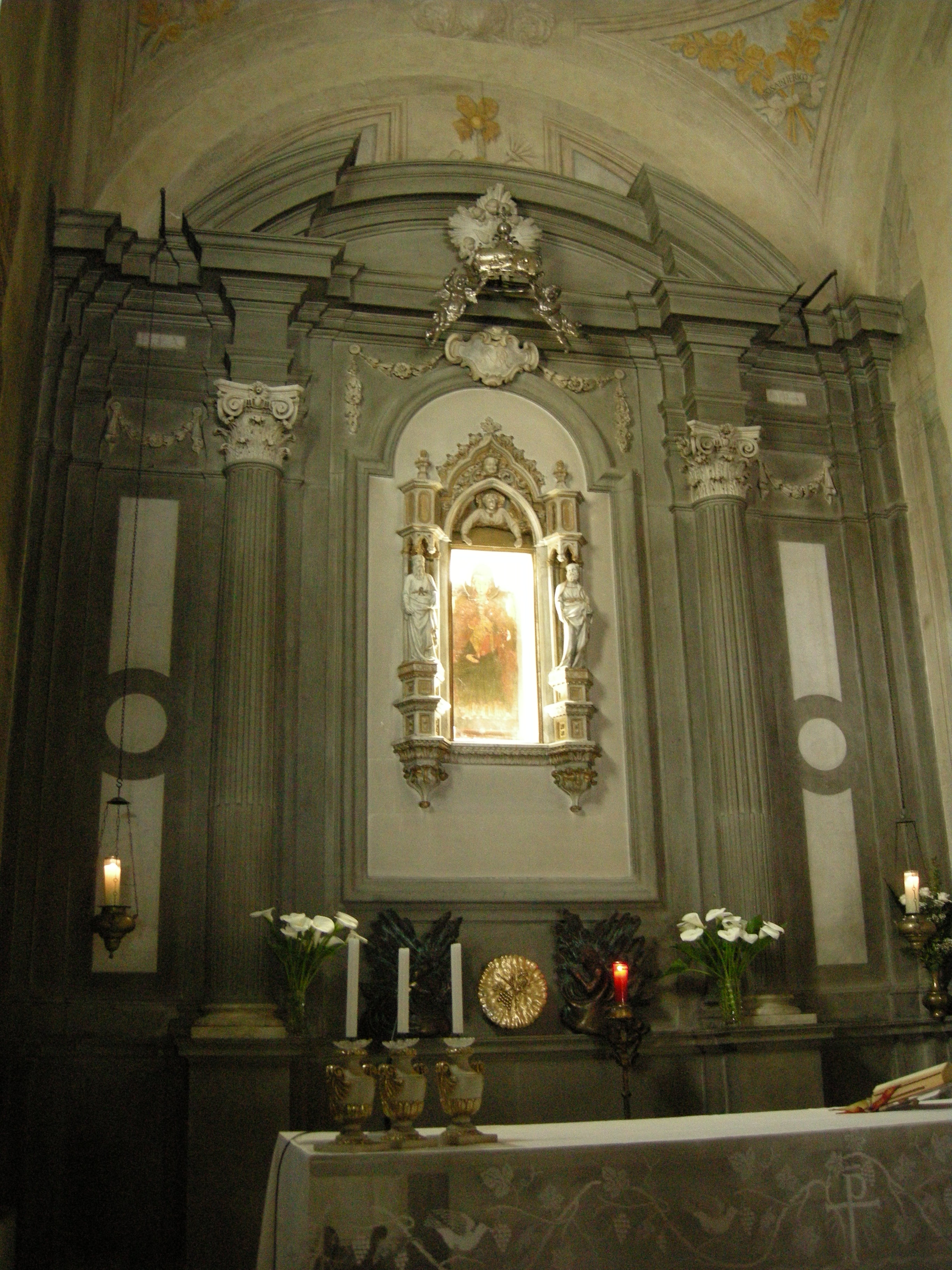
High altar

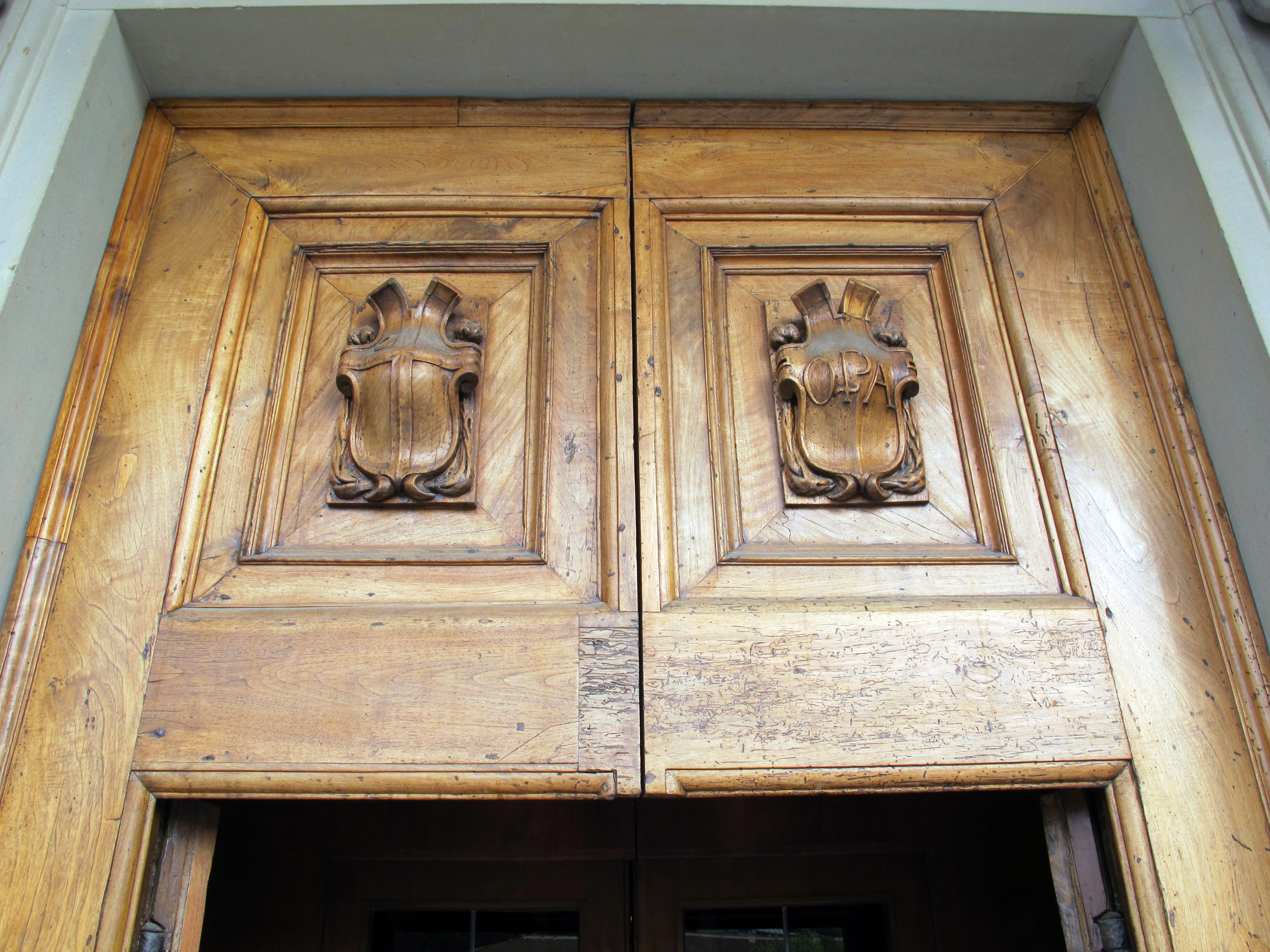
Top of the doors

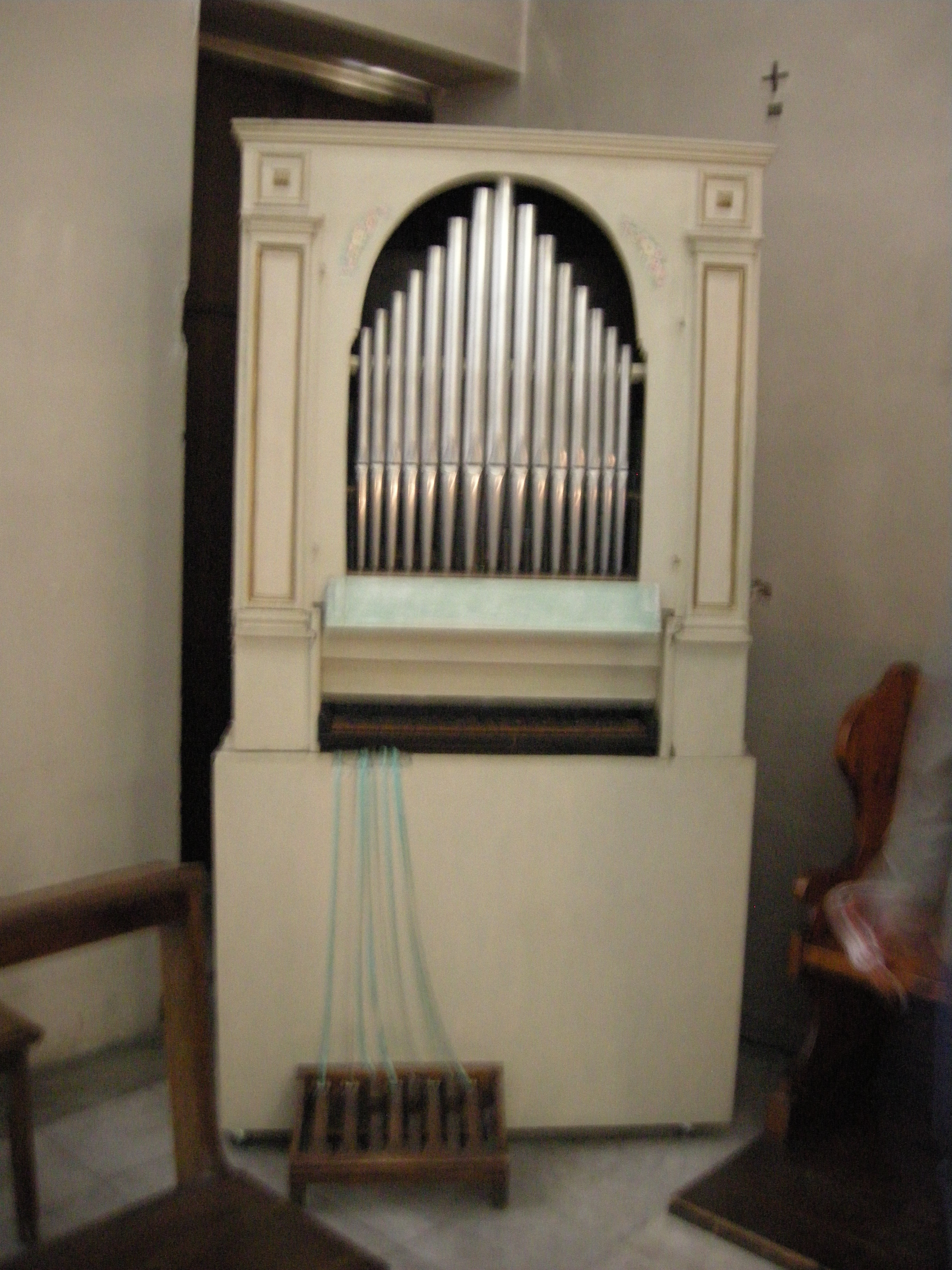
Pipe organ

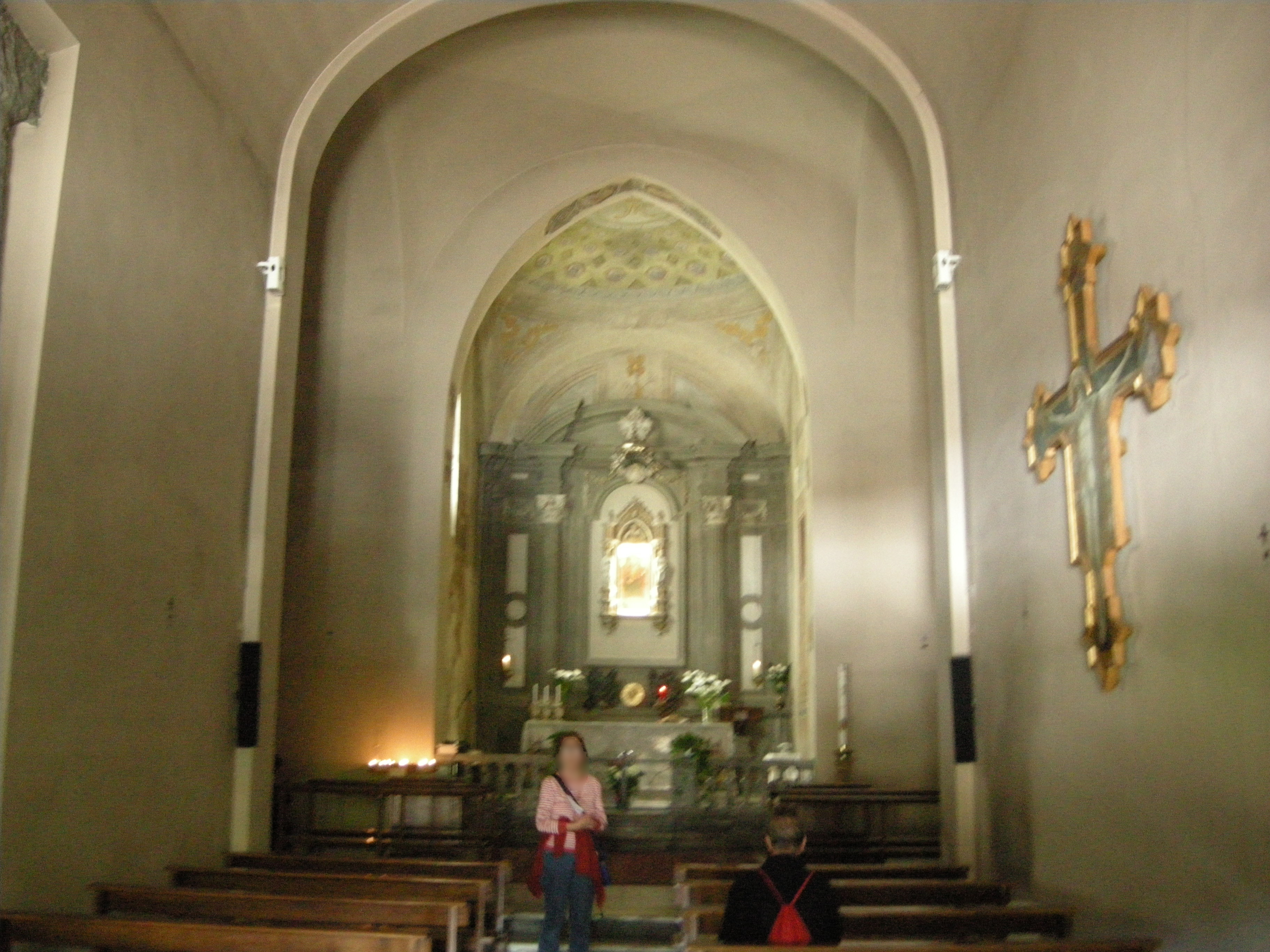
Transept
Artistic embellishments
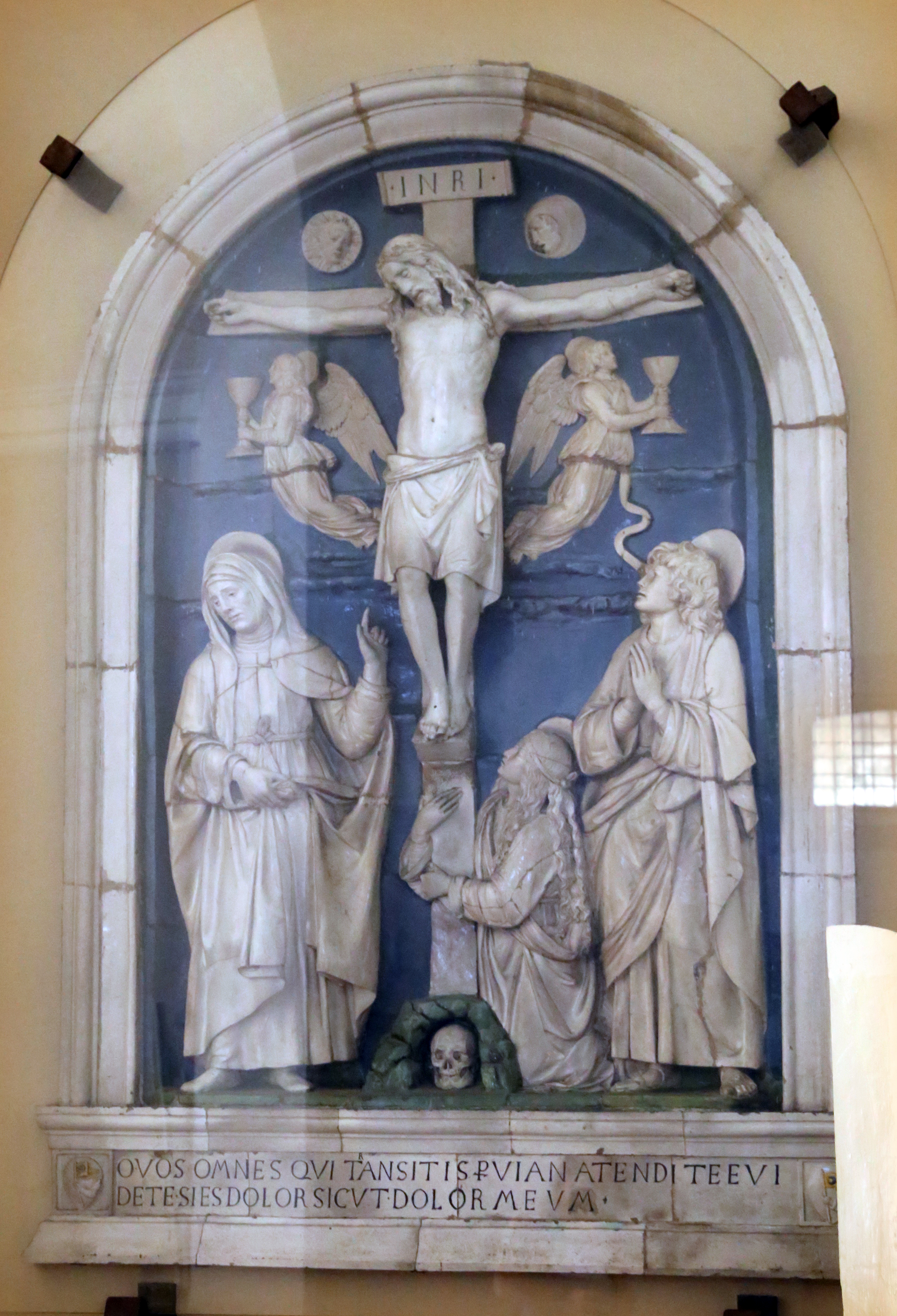
Andrea della Robbia's crucifix

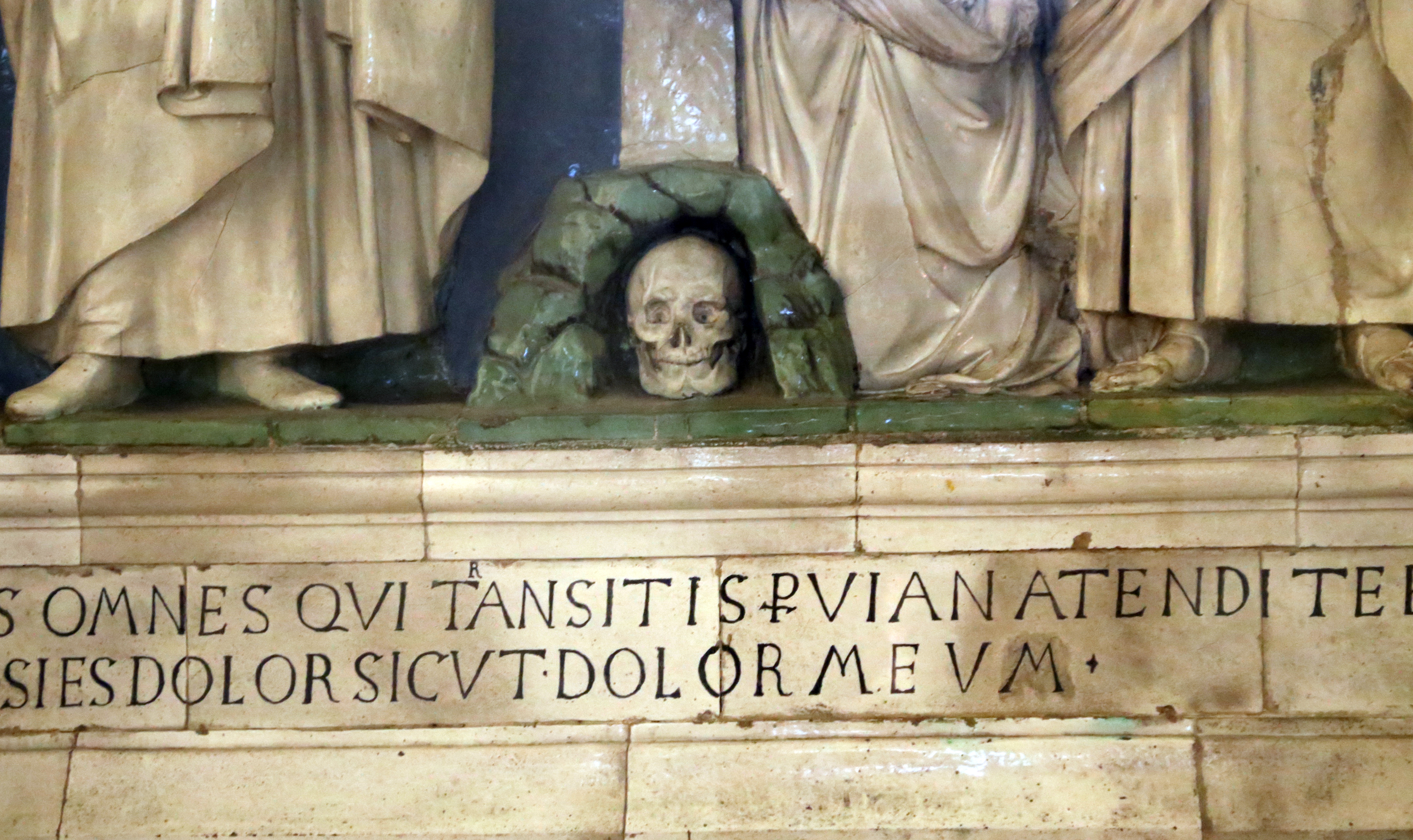
Base of the crucifix

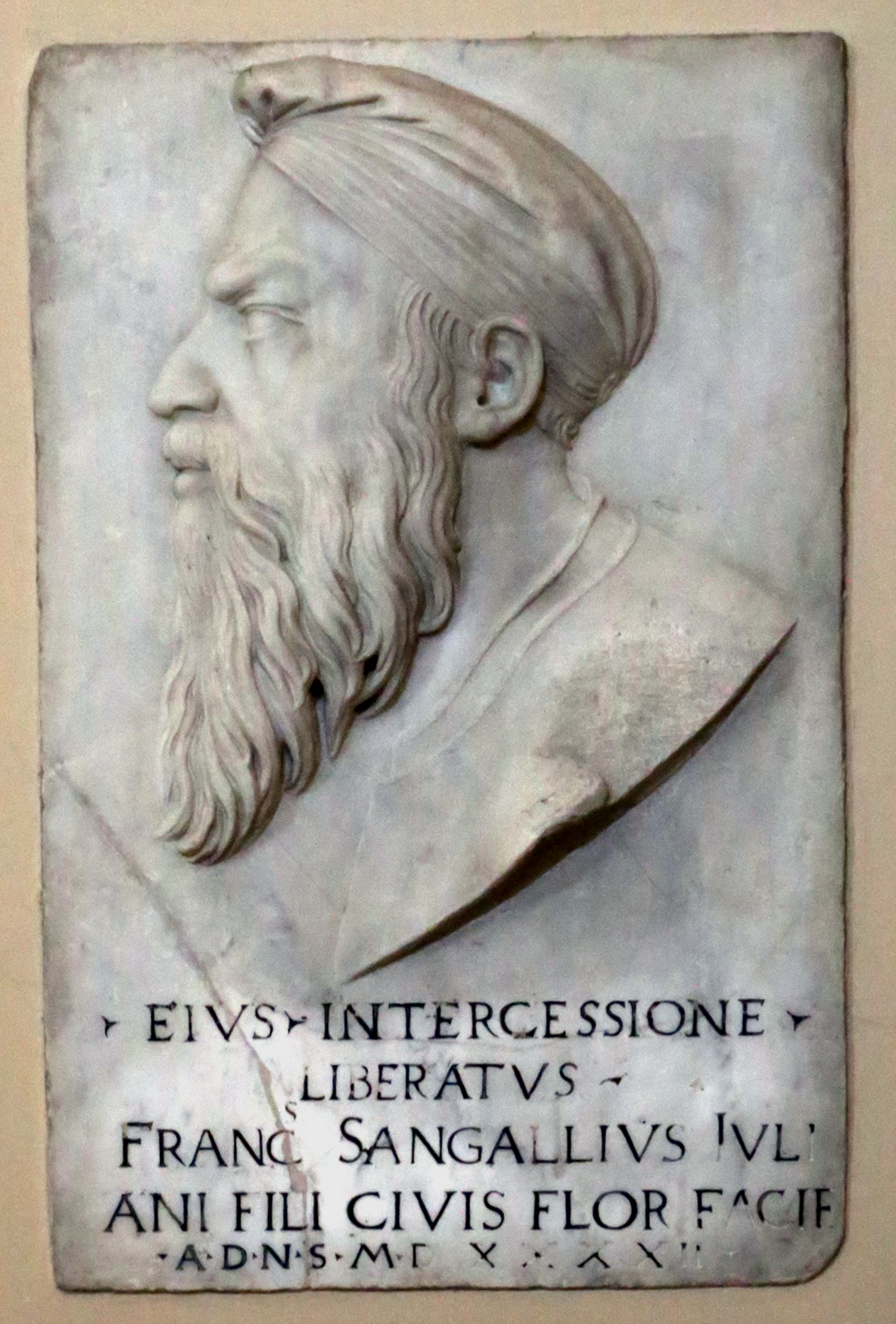
Sangallo's self-portrait relief

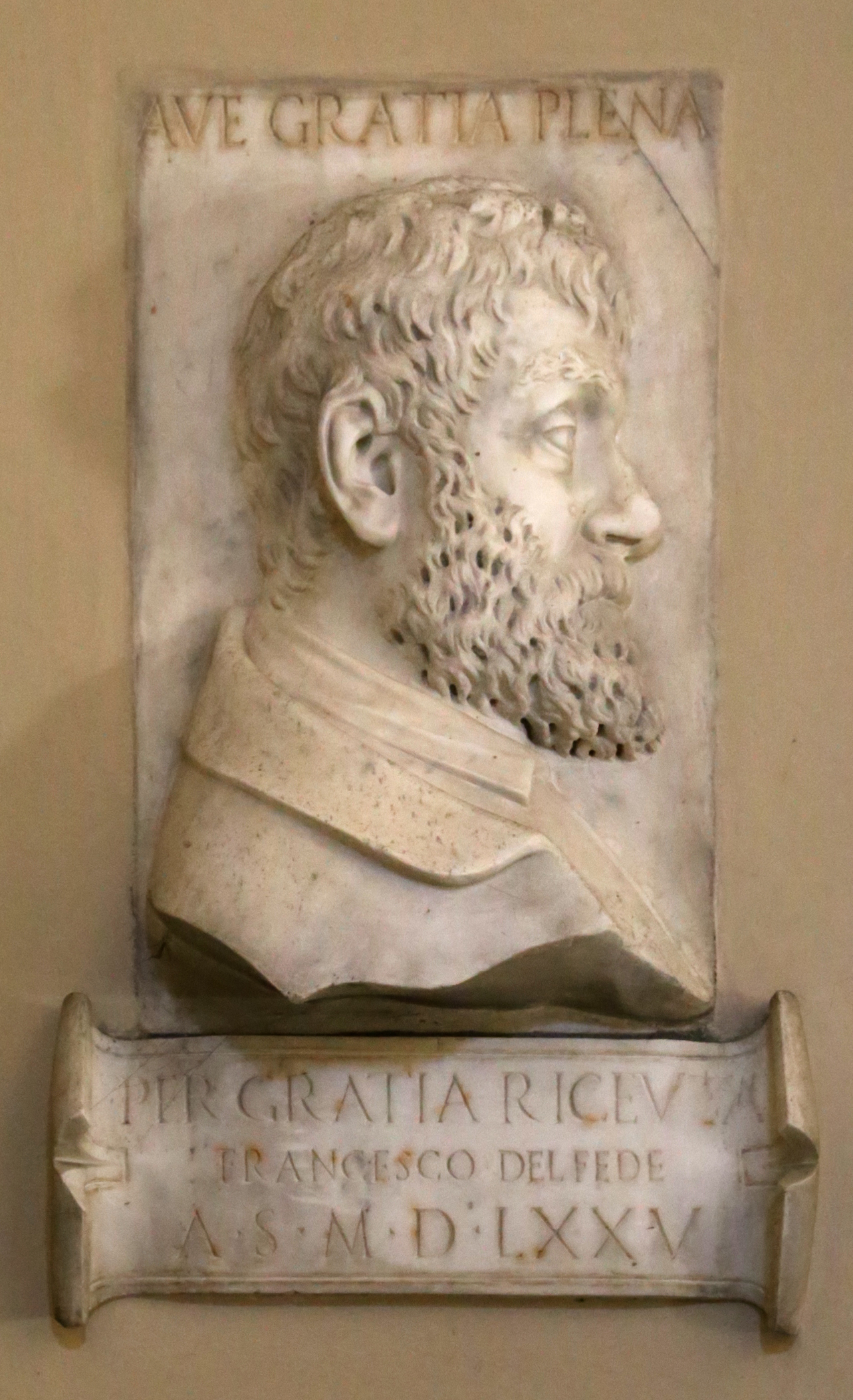
Sangallo's relief of Francesco del Fede

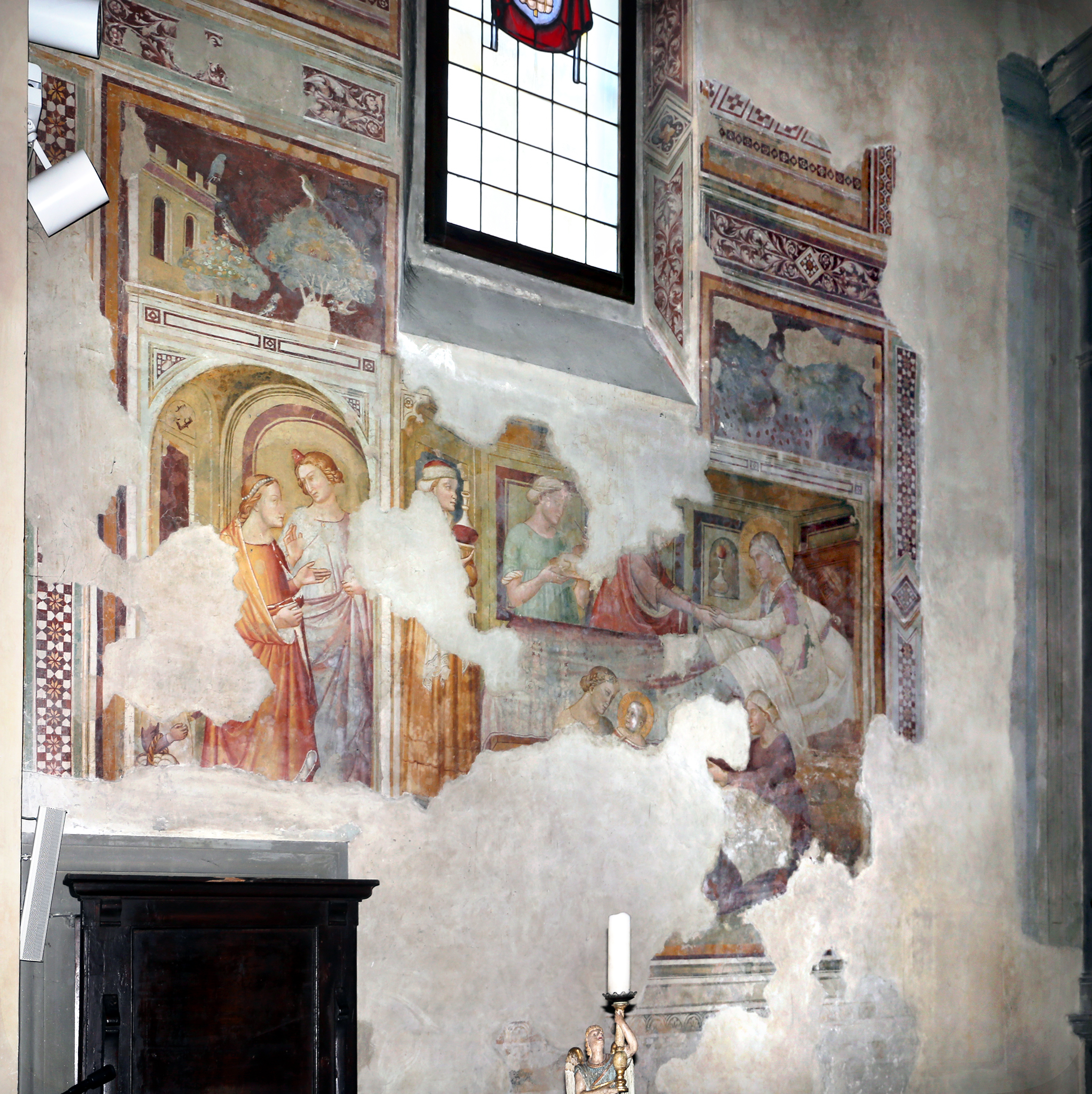
Remains of Gerini's fresco

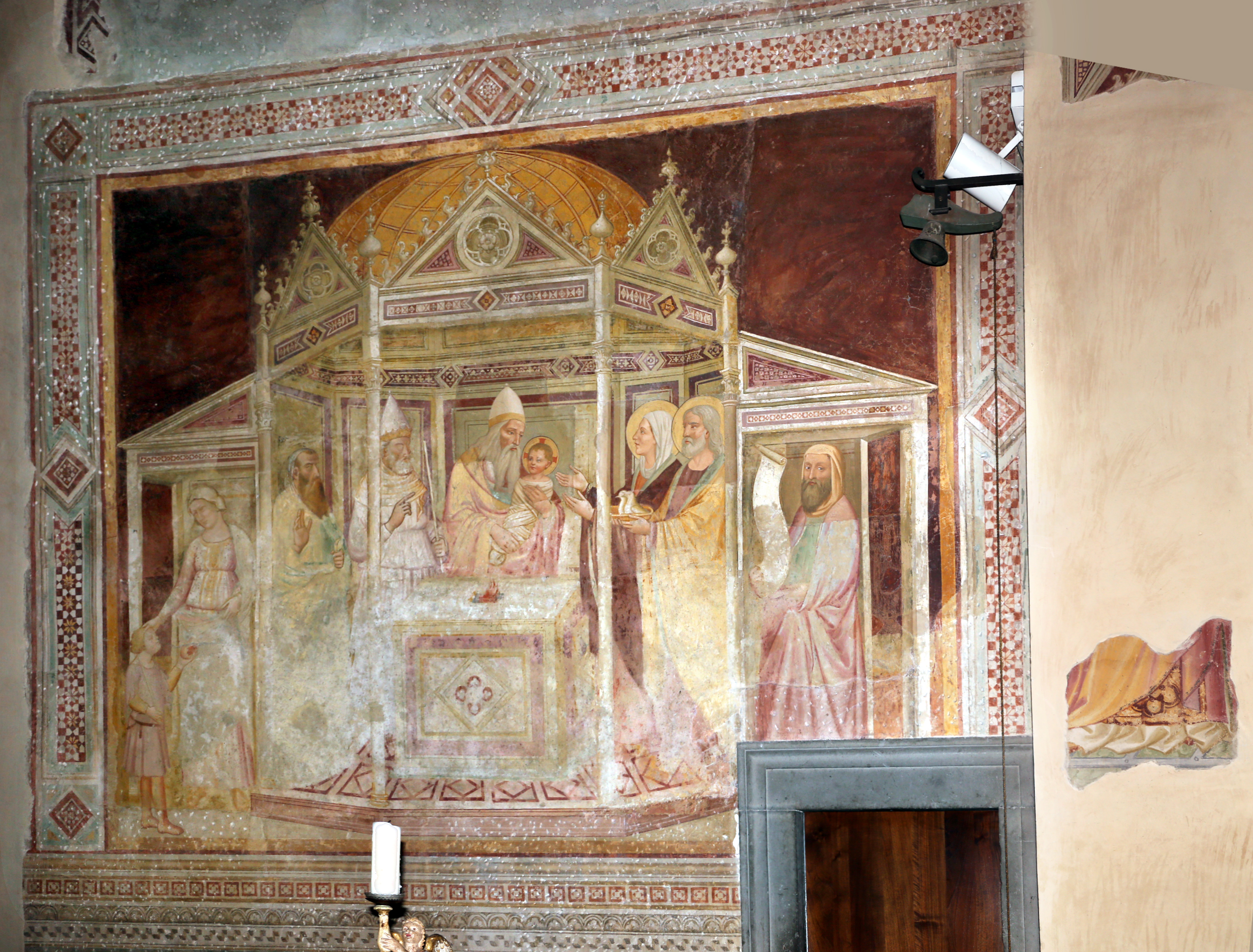
Intact fresco by Gerini

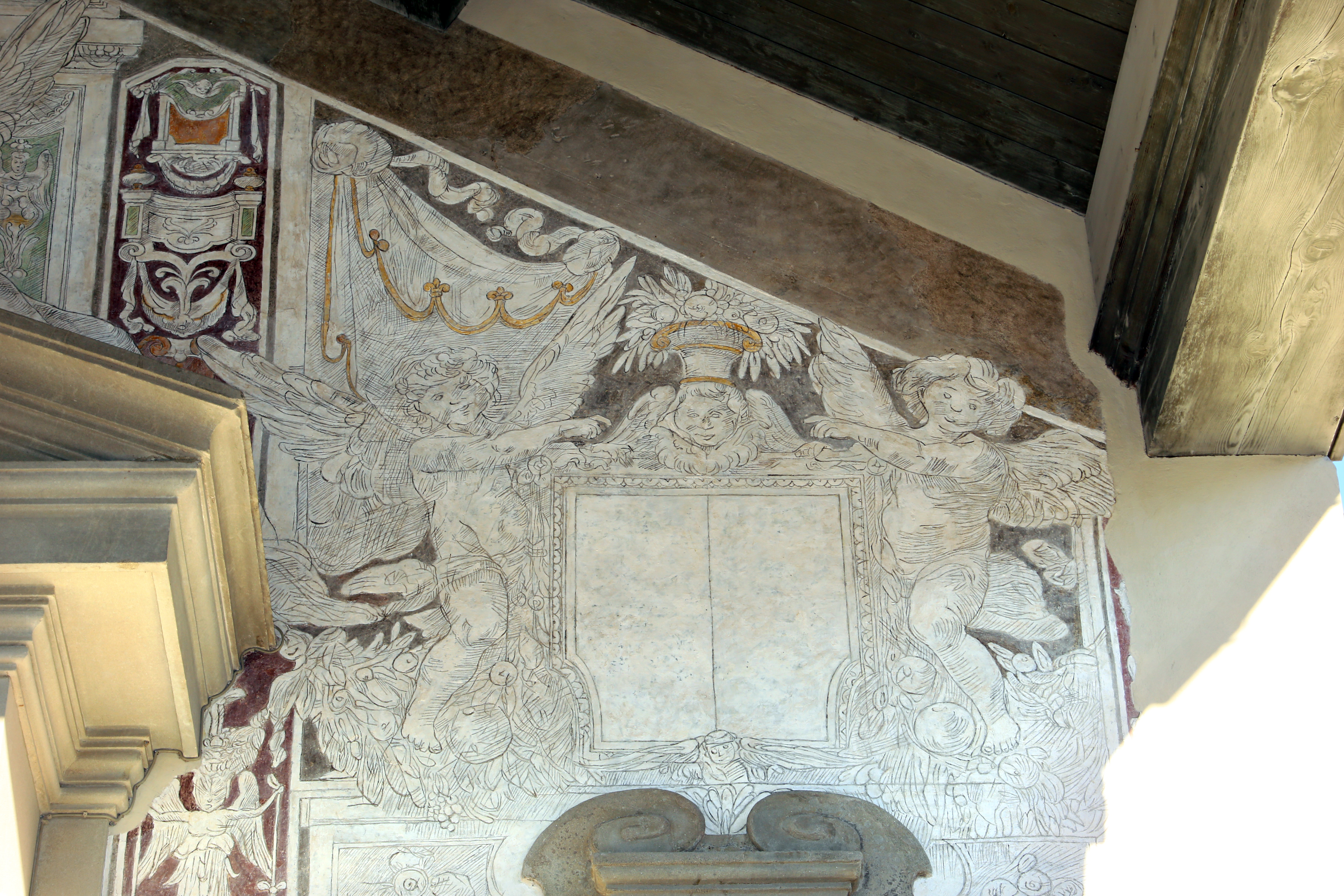
Buti's sgraffito above the entrance

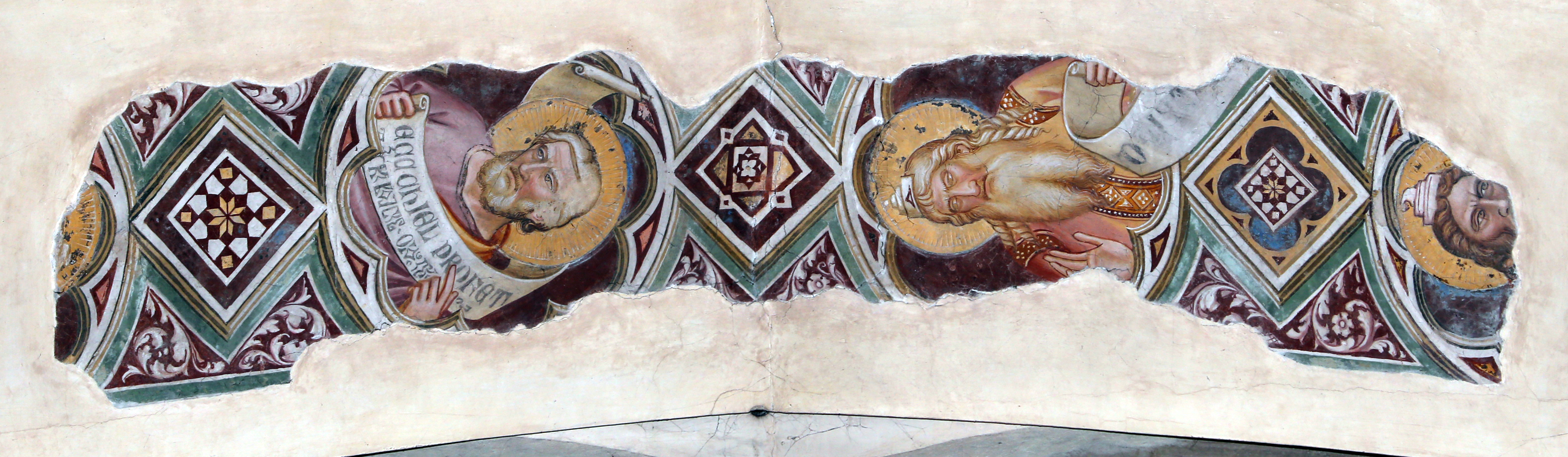
Gerini's ceiling fresco

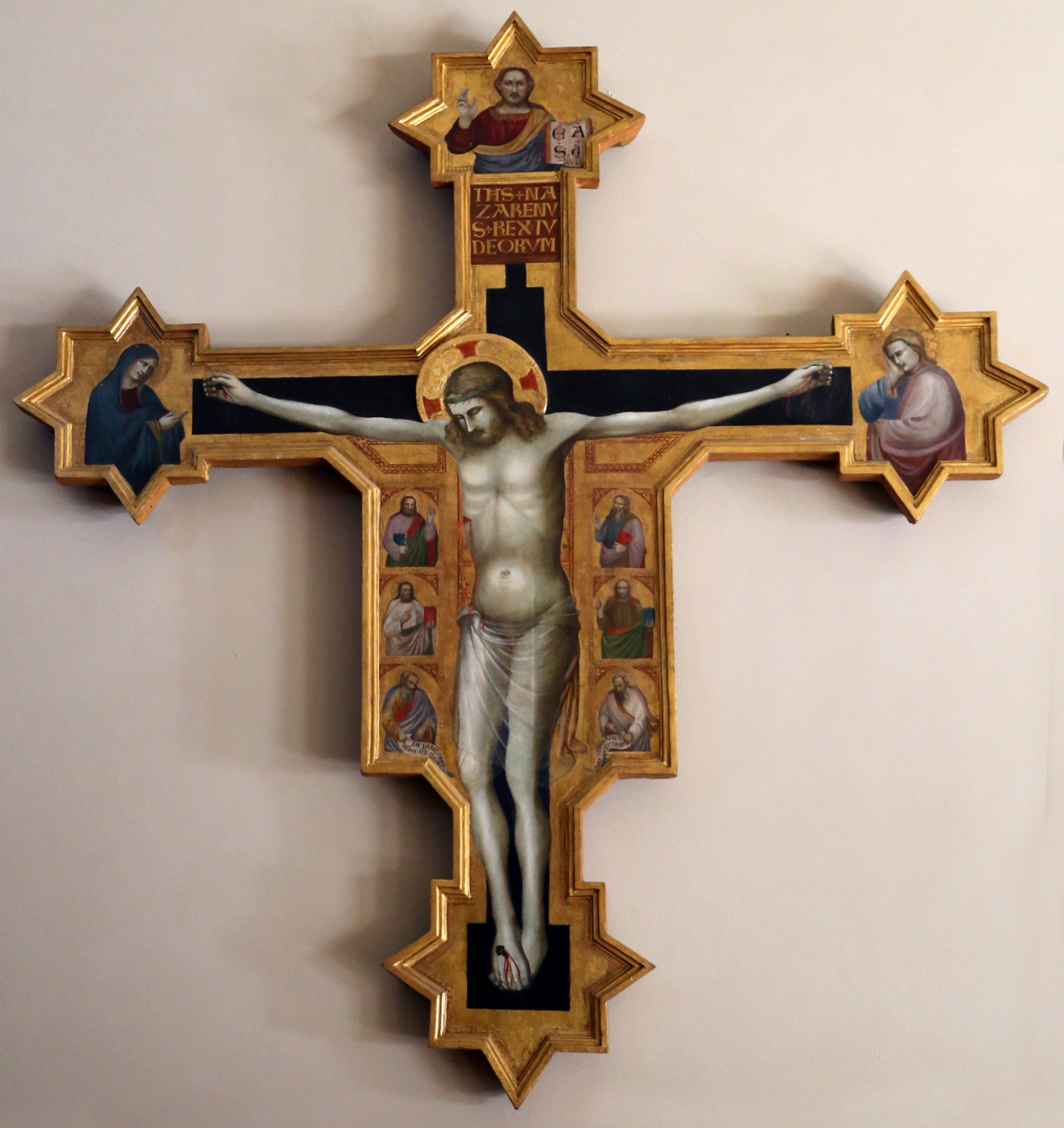
Bonaccorso di Cino's crucifix

== See also ==
- Fiesole Cathedral
- San Francesco Monastery (Fiesole)
- Diocesan Seminary of Fiesole
- Episcopal Palace, Fiesole
