= Stefano Manetti =

Italian Catholic bishop (born 1959)

His Excellency, The Most Reverend Stefano Manetti
- Bishop of Fiesole
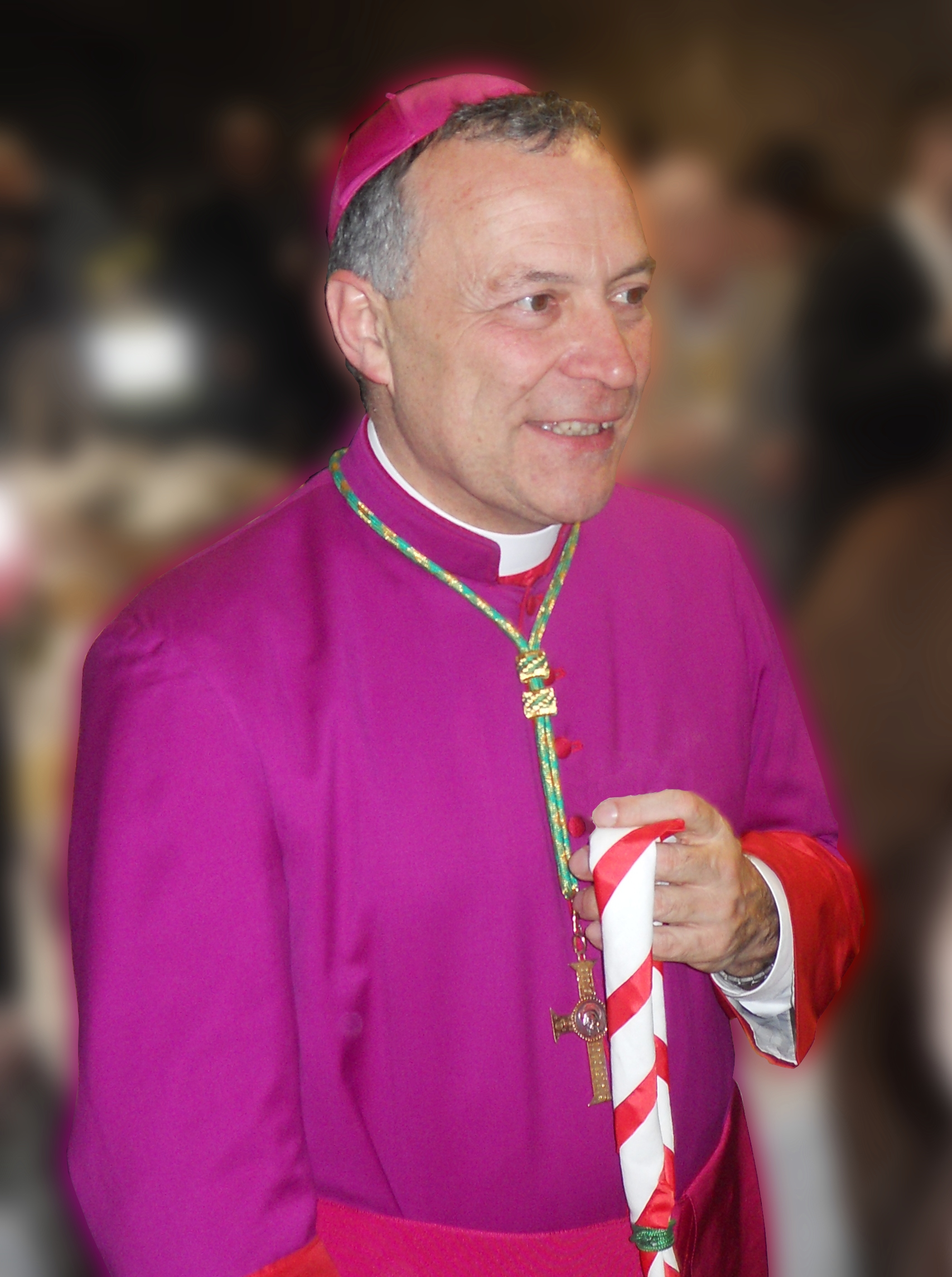
- Bishop Manetti in 2014
- Diocese: Fiesole
- Appointed: 21 April 2022
- Installed: 6 July 2022
- Predecessor: Mario Meini
- Previous post: Bishop of Montepulciano–Chiusi–Pienza (2014–2022)

Orders
- Ordination: 19 April 1984 by Silvano Piovanelli
- Consecration: 25 March 2014 by Giuseppe Betori

Personal details
- Born: 20 April 1959 (age 67) Florence, Tuscany, Italy
- Denomination: Roman Catholic
- Motto: Sequere me (Latin for 'Follow me')
- Coat of arms

Stefano Manetti (born 20 April 1959) is an Italian Catholic bishop. From 2014 to 2022, he was the Bishop of Montepulciano–Chiusi–Pienza. Since 2022, he has been the Bishop of Fiesole.

== Early life ==
Manetti was born on 20 April 1959 in Florence, Italy. He attended the liceo scientifico of Scandicci before entering the Archiepiscopal Major Seminary of Florence in 1978. He was ordained a priest on 19 April 1984 by the Archbishop of Florence, Silvano Piovanelli.

== Priestly ministry ==
From 1984 to 1987, Manetti was a parochial vicar at the Church of Santa Maria in Coverciano. He was then an ecclesiastical assistant at the San Michele youth community until 1995. At the same time, he was ecclesiastical assistant for the youth section of Azione Cattolica. In 1999, he became an ecclesiastical assistant for its adult section. In 1995, Manetti became the pastor of the Church of San Tommaso in Certaldo. He was a religion teacher at the same time.

In 2002, Manetti became the spiritual director of the Archiepiscopal Major Seminary of Florence and was appointed a canon of the chapter of the Basilica of San Lorenzo. In 2005, he was named the rector of the seminary and the head of vocations for the Archdiocese of Florence. Manetti was then appointed a canon of the chapter of the Cathedral of Santa Maria del Fiore and made an honorary canon of the chapter of the Basilica of San Lorenzo in 2009. He was also a member and coordinator of the archdiocese's presbyteral council. In 2009, he was appointed to the archdiocese's college of consultors.

== Episcopal ministry ==
=== Bishop of Montepulciano–Chiusi–Pienza ===
On 31 January 2014, Pope Francis appointed Manetti the Bishop of Montepulciano–Chiusi–Pienza. He succeeded Rodolfo Cetoloni, who was previously appointed the Bishop of Grosseto.

Manetti was consecrated a bishop on 25 March 2014 in the Florence Cathedral. The principal consecrator was Cardinal Giuseppe Betori, the Archbishop of Florence, and the principal co-consecrators were Cardinal Piovanelli, the Archbishop Emeritus of Florence; Cardinal Gualtiero Bassetti, the Bishop of Perugia–Città della Pieve; Claudio Maniago, the Auxiliary Bishop of Florence; and Rodolfo Cetoloni, the Bishop of Grosseto. All of the bishops of Tuscany were also co-consecrators.

Manetti took possession of the Diocese of Montepulciano–Chiusi–Pienza on 13 April 2014. As a member of the Tuscan Episcopal Conference, he was a delegate for clergy, seminaries, and vocations. As a member of the Italian Episcopal Conference, he was a member of the Episcopal Commission for the Clergy and Consecrated Life and of the Mixed Commission of Bishops - Institutes of Consecrated Life and Societies of Apostolic Life.

=== Bishop of Fiesole ===
On 21 April 2022, Pope Francis appointed Manetti to succeed Mario Meini as the Bishop of Fiesole. Manetti took possession of the diocese on 6 July 2022, the feast day of Saint Romulus, the patron saint of Fiesole. On 6 July, the pope also appointed Manetti the apostolic administrator of the Diocese of Montepulciano–Chiusi–Pienza until a new diocesan bishop could be appointed. Manetti remained as apostolic administrator until 3 September 2022, when Augusto Paolo Lojudice took possession as the archbishop-bishop (Note: See archbishop ad personam) of the diocese.

Catholic Church titles
Preceded by Rodolfo Cetoloni	Bishop of Montepulciano–Chiusi–Pienza; 2014–2022	Succeeded by Augusto Paolo Lojudice
Preceded by Himself as Bishop	Apostolic Administrator of Montepulciano–Chiusi–Pienza; 2022	Succeeded by Augusto Paolo Lojudice as Archbishop-Bishop
Preceded by Mario Meini	Bishop of Fiesole; 2022–present	Incumbent
