= Alessandro Piazza =

Italian Catholic bishop

His Excellency, The Most Reverend Alessandro Piazza
- Bishop of Albenga-Imperia
- Diocese: Diocese of Albenga-Imperia
- Appointed: 18 May 1965
- Term ended: 6 October 1990
- Predecessor: Gilberto Baroni
- Successor: Mario Oliveri

Orders
- Ordination: 11 June 1938
- Consecration: 24 June 1965 by Giuseppe Cardinal Siri

Personal details
- Born: 20 July 1915 Genoa, Liguria
- Died: 10 September 1995 (aged 80) Albenga, Liguria
- Denomination: Roman Catholic

Ordination history of Alessandro Piazza
History
Priestly ordination
- Date: 11 July 1938
- Place: Genoa Cathedral
Episcopal consecration
- Principal consecrator: Giuseppe Siri
- Co-consecrators: Pietro Zuccarino (Bobbio-San Colombano); Franco Costa (Emmaüs)
- Date: 24 June 1965
- Place: Genoa Cathedral

Alessandro Piazza (20 July 1915 – 16 September 1995) was an Italian biblical scholar and the Bishop of Albenga.

== Biography ==
Alessandro Piazza was born on 20 July 1915 in Genoa. He studied at the Minor Archdiocesan Seminary and later at the Major Archdiocesan Seminary of his hometown. On 11 July 1938, at the age of 22, he was ordained a priest in the Cathedral of Saint Lawrence in Genoa. The Archbishop of Genoa, Pietro Cardinal Boetto, sent him to continue his studies in sacred scripture and theology at the Pontifical Biblical Institute in Rome. There, he received the licentiate degree and was assigned as a teacher of Hebrew and Scripture at the Archdiocesan Major Seminary.

On 18 May 1965 he was appointed the Bishop of Albenga and consecrated in the Genoa Cathedral on 24 June. The principal consecrator was Giuseppe Cardinal Siri. As Bishop, he oversaw the complete restoration of the Cathedral of Saint Michael of Albenga, restoring it to its original Romanesque style. He also founded the Institute for Religious Sciences in the diocese and favored the cultural reinvigoration of the clergy and laity in light of the Second Vatican Council, of which he was a member and participant in its last session.

As a biblical scholar, he served as the secretary of the episcopal committee and as a member of the editorial board of Bible of CEI, the official Italian translation of the Bible for liturgical use published in 1971. Along with biblical scholar Enrico Galbiati, he wrote the book Difficult Pages of the Old Testament (Italian: Pagine difficili della Antico Testamento), of which many Italian editions were released and translations into English, Spanish, Polish, and Russian were made.

On 1 December 1973, the Diocese of Albenga, which was established in the fifth century, changed its name without changing its structure, taking the name of Diocese of Albenga-Imperia, to better reflect the presence of the capital of Liguria that had always been a part of its territory. With the change in name of the diocese, Piazza's title was changed to Bishop of Albenga-Imperia.

On 6 October 1990, Pope John Paul II accepted his resignation from pastoral governance of the diocese due to age and appointed Mario Meini as his successor. Piazza retired to the Episcopal Seminary of Albenga, from where he collaborated with his successor until his death on 16 September 1995.

Piazza was buried in the right nave beneath the altar of the Blessed Sacrament in the Albenga Cathedral.

Catholic Church titles
| Preceded by Gilberto Baroni | Bishop of Albenga-Imperia; 1965–1990 | Succeeded by Mario Oliveri |
