= Simone Scatizzi =

Italian Roman Catholic bishop

- Bishop of Pistoia
- Church: Catholic Church
- Diocese: Diocese of Pistoia
- In office: 27 May 1981 – 4 November 2006
- Predecessor: Mario Longo Dorni
- Successor: Mansueto Bianchi
- Previous post: Bishop of Fiesole (1977-1981)

Orders
- Ordination: 29 June 1954
- Consecration: 8 September 1977 by Pietro Fiordelli

Personal details
- Born: 26 May 1931 Coiano, Province of Florence, Kingdom of Italy
- Died: 27 August 2010 (aged 79) Pistoia, Tuscany, Italy

Simone Scatizzi (26 May 1931 – 27 August 2010) was the Roman Catholic bishop of the Roman Catholic Diocese of Pistoia, Italy.

== Biography ==
Scattizzi was born in Coiano, a neighborhood in Prato, on May 26, 1931. He entered the seminary in Prato at a young age and pursued studies in theology, later attending the seminary in Pistoia.

Ordained in 1954, Scatizzi was appointed bishop of the Roman Catholic Diocese of Fiesole, Italy and then in 1981, Bishop of the Pistola Diocese retiring in 2006.

In 2005, Scatizzi became the focus of controversy regarding civil partnerships, ending up on the front page of La Repubblica.

In February 2010, he once again made headlines due to statements he made about homosexuality, where he characterized this sexual orientation as "a disorder." The bishop also reiterated that practicing and unrepentant homosexuals should not receive communion. These statements led to strong protests against the Catholic Church from major Italian LGBT associations and some politicians. Arcigay, represented by its president Aurelio Mancuso, stated that the Catholic confession offends the dignity of homosexuals.

== Notes ==
Catholic Church titles
Preceded by Mario Longo Dorni	Bishop of Pistoia; 1981–2006	Succeeded by Mansueto Bianchi
Preceded by Antonio Bagnoli	Bishop of Fiesole; 1977–1981	Succeeded by Luciano Giovannetti
