= Mario Oliveri =

Italian Catholic bishop

His Excellency, The Most Reverend Mario Oliveri
- Bishop Emeritus of Albenga-Imperia
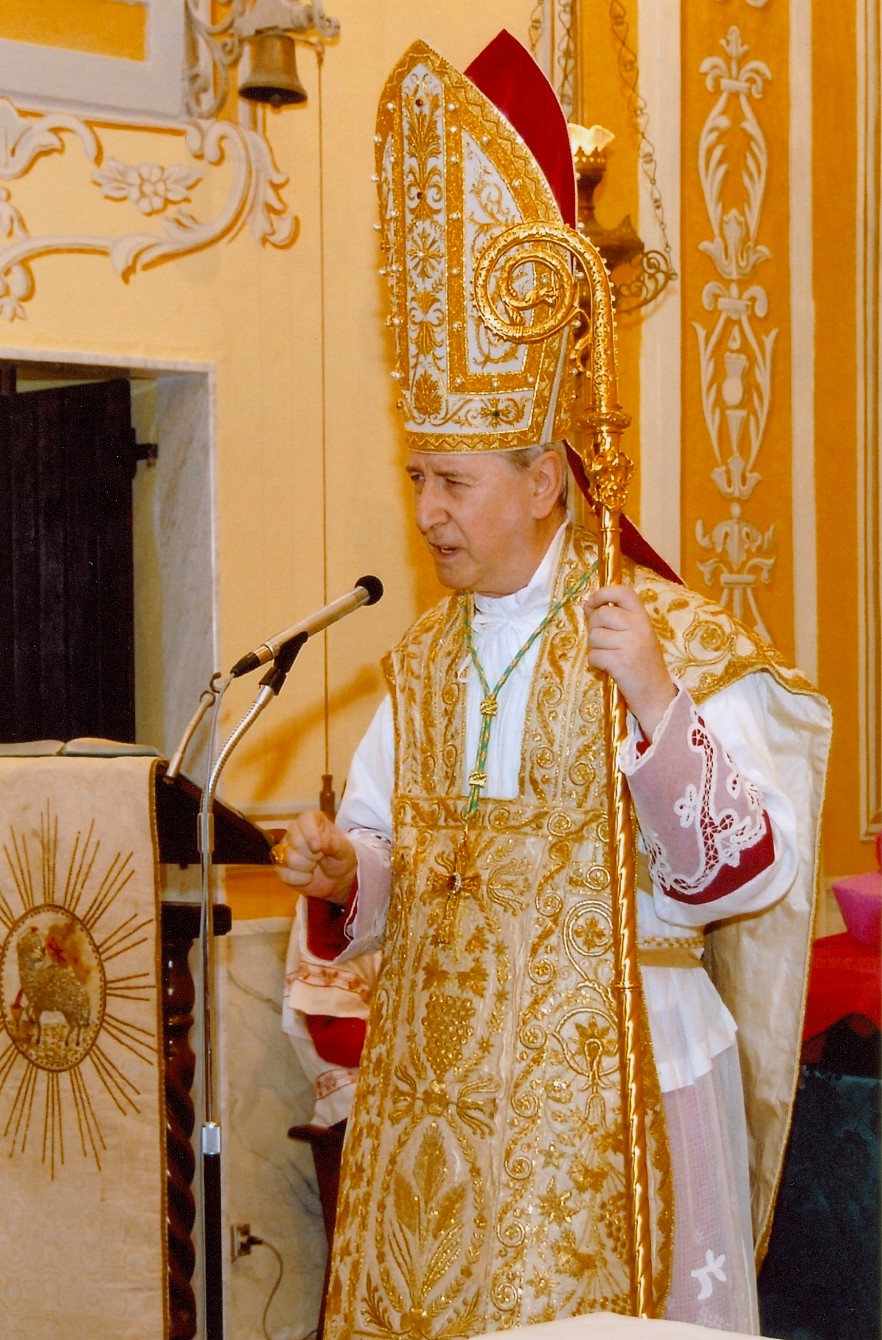
- Bishop Oliveri on 8 July 2009
- Diocese: Diocese of Albenga-Imperia
- Appointed: 6 October 1990
- Installed: 25 November 1990
- Term ended: 1 September 2016
- Predecessor: Alessandro Piazza
- Successor: Guglielmo Borghetti

Orders
- Ordination: 29 June 1968 by Giuseppe Dell’Omo
- Consecration: 4 November 1990 by Giovanni Cardinal Canestri

Personal details
- Born: 22 January 1944 (age 82) Campo Ligure, Liguria, Kingdom of Italy
- Denomination: Roman Catholic
- Motto: Fides et Pax; English: Faith and Peace

Styles of Mario Oliveri
- Reference style: His Excellency; The Most Reverend
- Spoken style: Your Excellency
- Religious style: Bishop

Ordination history of Mario Oliveri
History
Priestly ordination
- Ordained by: Giuseppe Dell'Omo
Episcopal consecration
- Principal consecrator: Giovanni Cardinal Canestri
- Co-consecrators: Luigi Cardinal Poggi; Giuseppe Dell'Omo

Mario Oliveri (born 22 January 1944) is an Italian prelate of the Catholic Church who was the bishop of Albenga–Imperia from 1990 to 2016, then becoming bishop emeritus of the diocese.

== Biography ==
Mario Oliveri was born on 22 January 1944 within the Diocese of Acqui in Campo Ligure, a comune in the Province of Genoa and region of Liguria in Italy. He was born the youngest of four children to a farming family.

=== Priestly ministry ===
Oliveri studied in seminaries in Acqui and in Turin.

On 29 June 1968, he was ordained a priest in the Acqui Cathedral by Bishop Giuseppe Dell'Omo.

He later studied in Rome, where he defended his doctoral thesis in canon law from the Pontifical Lateran University, which was published by Marietti Editore and later by the Vatican Publishing House. From 1970 to 1972, he took courses at the Pontifical Ecclesiastical Academy.

On 1 July 1972, Oliveri entered the diplomatic service of the Holy See, first as secretary of the apostolic nunciature in Dakar, Senegal, and later at the Secretariat of State in Rome as secretary to Cardinal Giovanni Benelli. From 1978 to 1985, he served in the apostolic nunciature in London and Paris before being recalled to the apostolic nunciature in Rome.

In 1978, he received the title of Honorary Prelate of His Holiness.

=== Episcopal ministry ===
On 6 October 1990, Oliveri was appointed the Bishop of Albenga-Imperia by Pope John Paul II; he succeeded Alessandro Piazza, who resigned due to his age. He was consecrated a bishop on 4 November of that year in a parish church of Campo Ligure by principal consecrator Giovanni Cardinal Canestri and co-consecrators Archbishop Luigi Poggi and Bishop Giuseppe Dell'Omo. He took the Latin motto "Fides et Pax," which translates to "Faith and Peace." On 25 November, he was installed in his diocese.

Oliveri has also served as a member of the Congregation for Divine Worship and the Discipline of the Sacraments and the international council for the catechesis for the Congregation for the Clergy.

After a long series of scandals involving several priests of his diocese, Pope Francis instructed Apostolic Nuncio to Italy Adriano Bernardini to open an investigation of the state of the diocese. Following the investigation, the Pope decided to appoint Guglielmo Borghetti as coadjutor bishop of the diocese in January 2015, vesting him with full authority.

The Holy See objected to lack of discernment in the ordination of priests and the willingness to accommodate expelled seminarians from other dioceses previously involved in scandals or considered unfit for the priesthood. Many of the priests came under media attention, including during their time in the Diocese of Albenga, for sexual scandals (such as possession of pornographic material), for a lifestyle considered improper for a priest (such as the publication of nude photographs on social media), and being the subject of judicial investigation for pedophilia, embezzlement, homicide, harassment, and property crimes.

With full episcopal and administrative authority resting in the new coadjutor as of 25 March 2015, Oliveri retained the title of Bishop of Albenga-Imperia without any power. On 1 September 2016, Pope Francis accepted his resignation from pastoral governance of the diocese. Effective upon resignation, Oliveri took the title of Bishop Emeritus of Albenga-Imperia.

Catholic Church titles
Preceded by Alessandro Piazza	Bishop of Albenga-Imperia; 1990–2016	Succeeded by Guglielmo Borghetti
