= Atinolfo =

Atinolfo was the Bishop of Fiesole (1038–1057) and an opponent of Papal reform.

Onomastics suggest that he was a Lombard originally from southern Italy. Atinolfo was staying in Florence when he was appointed bishop by the Emperor Conrad II in February or March 1038. His predecessor, also an imperial appointee, was Iacopo il Bavaro, was a reformer who restored the diocesan patrimony. Atinolfo appears to have been otherwise. He repossessed the possessions of the diocese which Iacopo had granted to the monastery of San Bartolomeo. As late as July 1039 he was still not consecrated, despite the growing movement within Latin Christendom against that practice. He appears also to have been an imperial partisan, though imperial intervention in ecclesiastical affairs would soon stir up the Investiture Controversy. On 25 October 1046 he attended the Synod of Pavia convoked by the Emperor Henry III.

Nonetheless, Atinolfo signed the canons with Gerard, Bishop of Florence, of a Roman synod convened under Pope Leo IX, a reformer, in May 1050. On 15 July 1050, while the pope was passing through Florence, the monks of San Bartolomeo met him and implored him to confirm the donation that Iacopo had made to them. The pope did and Atinolof complied by restoring the possessions in a charter in which he describes Conrad II, not the pope, as senior mei (my lord). Atinolof was last recorded in July 1057 at a synod of Tuscan bishops in Arezzo under Pope Victor II.
