= Diocese of Montepulciano–Chiusi–Pienza =

Roman Catholic diocese in Italy

Coordinates: 43.1000°N 11.7833°E

Diocese of Montepulciano-Chiusi-Pienza Dioecesis Montis Politiani-Clusina-Pientina

Catholic
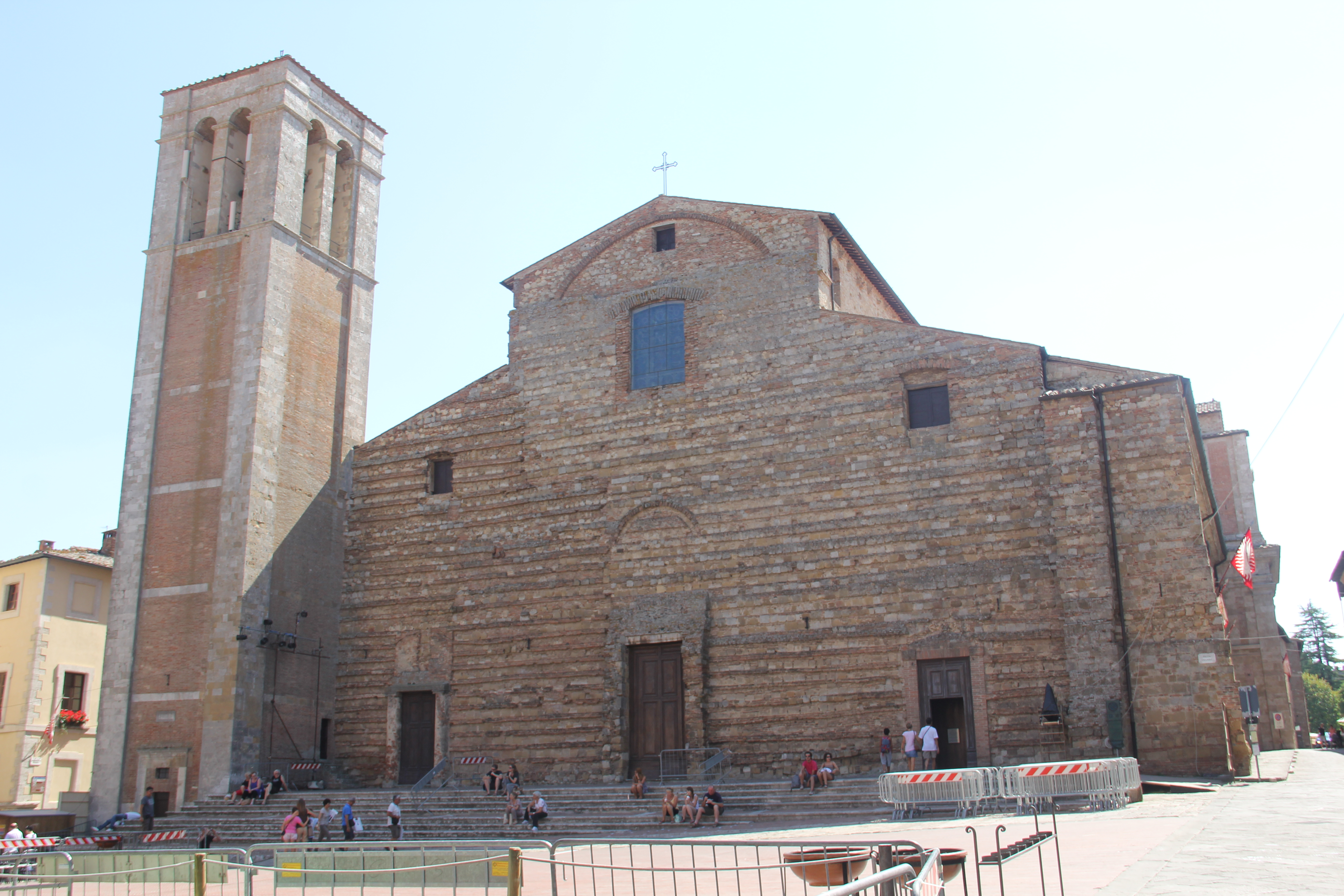
- Montepulciano Cathedral

Location
- Country: Italy
- Ecclesiastical province: Siena-Colle di Val d'Elsa-Montalcino

Statistics
- Area: 1,068 km^{2} (412 sq mi)
- Population: Total; Catholics: (as of 2004); 73,100; 70,100 (95.9%)
- Parishes: 46

Information
- Denomination: Catholic Church
- Rite: Roman Rite
- Established: 10 November 1561
- Cathedral: Cattedrale di S. Maria Assunta (Montepulciano)
- Co-cathedral: Concattedrale di S. Secondiano (Chiusi); Concattedrale di Maria SS. Assunta (Pienza)

Current leadership
- Pope: Leo XIV
- Bishop: Augusto Paolo Lojudice

Map

Website
- www.montepulcianochiusipienza.it

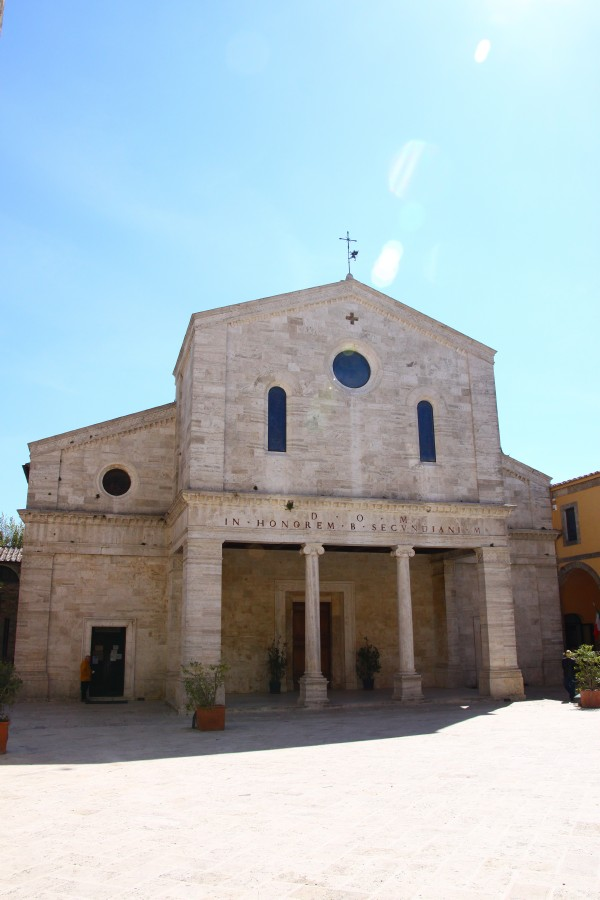
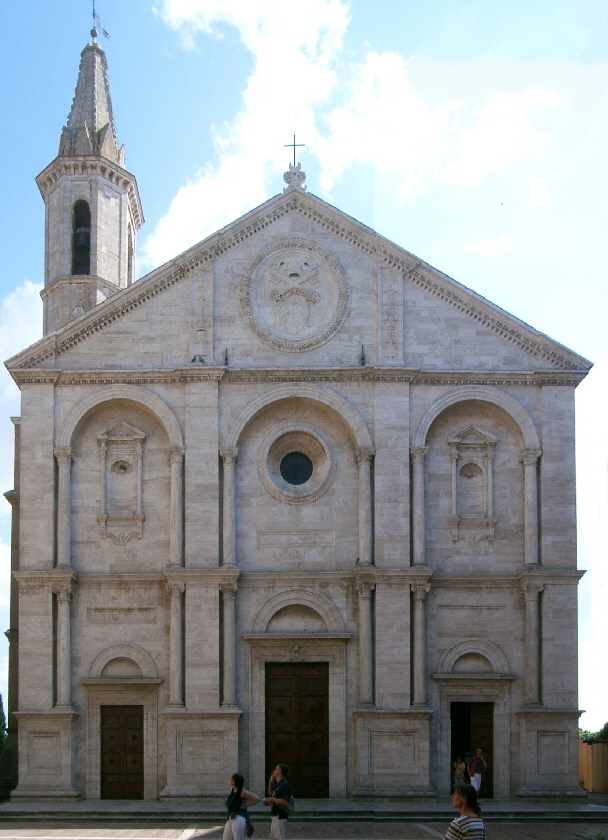
Co-cathedral in Chiusi (left) Co-cathedral in Pienza (right)

The Diocese of Montepulciano-Chiusi-Pienza (Latin: Dioecesis Montis Politiani-Clusina-Pientina) is a Latin Church diocese of the Catholic Church in Tuscany. It has existed in the current form since 1986. In that year the diocese of Chiusi-Pienza was united into the historical Diocese of Montepulciano. The diocese is a suffragan of the Archdiocese of Siena-Colle di Val d'Elsa-Montalcino.

== History ==
Montepulciano belonged originally to the diocese of Arezzo, and had a collegiate church, whose archpriest became a mitred abbot in 1400; in 1480 it became a prælatura nullius, and in 1561 was made an episcopal see.

Its first bishop was Spinello Benci (1562); among the others were:

- Talento de' Talenti (1640), a savant;
- Antonio Cervini (1663);
- Pietro Francesi (1737) opposed the novelties of the Council of Florence in 1787;
- Pellegrino Maria Carletti (1802), author of several works and of eighteen letters on the National Council of Paris of 1810, which he attended.

On 18 February 1984, the Vatican and the Italian State signed a new and revised concordat. Based on the revisions, a set of Normae was issued on 15 November 1984, which was accompanied in the next year, on 3 June 1985, by enabling legislation. According to the agreement, the practice of having one bishop govern two separate dioceses at the same time, aeque personaliter, was abolished. This applied to the diocese of Chiusi e Pienza. Instead, the Vatican continued consultations which had begun under Pope John XXIII for the merging of small dioceses, especially those with personnel and financial problems, into one combined diocese. On 30 September 1986, Pope John Paul II ordered that the dioceses of Montepulciano, Chiusi and Pienza be merged into one diocese with one bishop, with the Latin title Dioecesis Montis Politiani-Clusina-Pientina. The seat of the diocese was to be in Montepulciano, and was to serve as the cathedral of the merged diocese. The cathedrals in Chiusi and Pienza were to become co-cathedrals, and the cathedral Chapters were each to be a Capitulum Concathedralis. There was to be only one diocesan Tribunal, in Montepulciano, and likewise one seminary, one College of Consultors, and one Priests' Council. The territory of the new diocese was to include the territory of the former dioceses of Chiusi and Pienza, and was suffragan to the archdiocese of Siena.

== Bishops ==
- Rodolfo Cetoloni (25 March 2000 – 28 May 2013)
- Stefano Manetti (31 January 2014 – 21 April 2022)
- Augusto Paolo Lojudice (21 July 2022 – present)

== See also ==
- Roman Catholic Diocese of Chiusi-Pienza
