= Mario Meini =

Italian Catholic bishop

His Excellency, The Most Reverend Mario Meini
- Bishop Emeritus of Fiesole
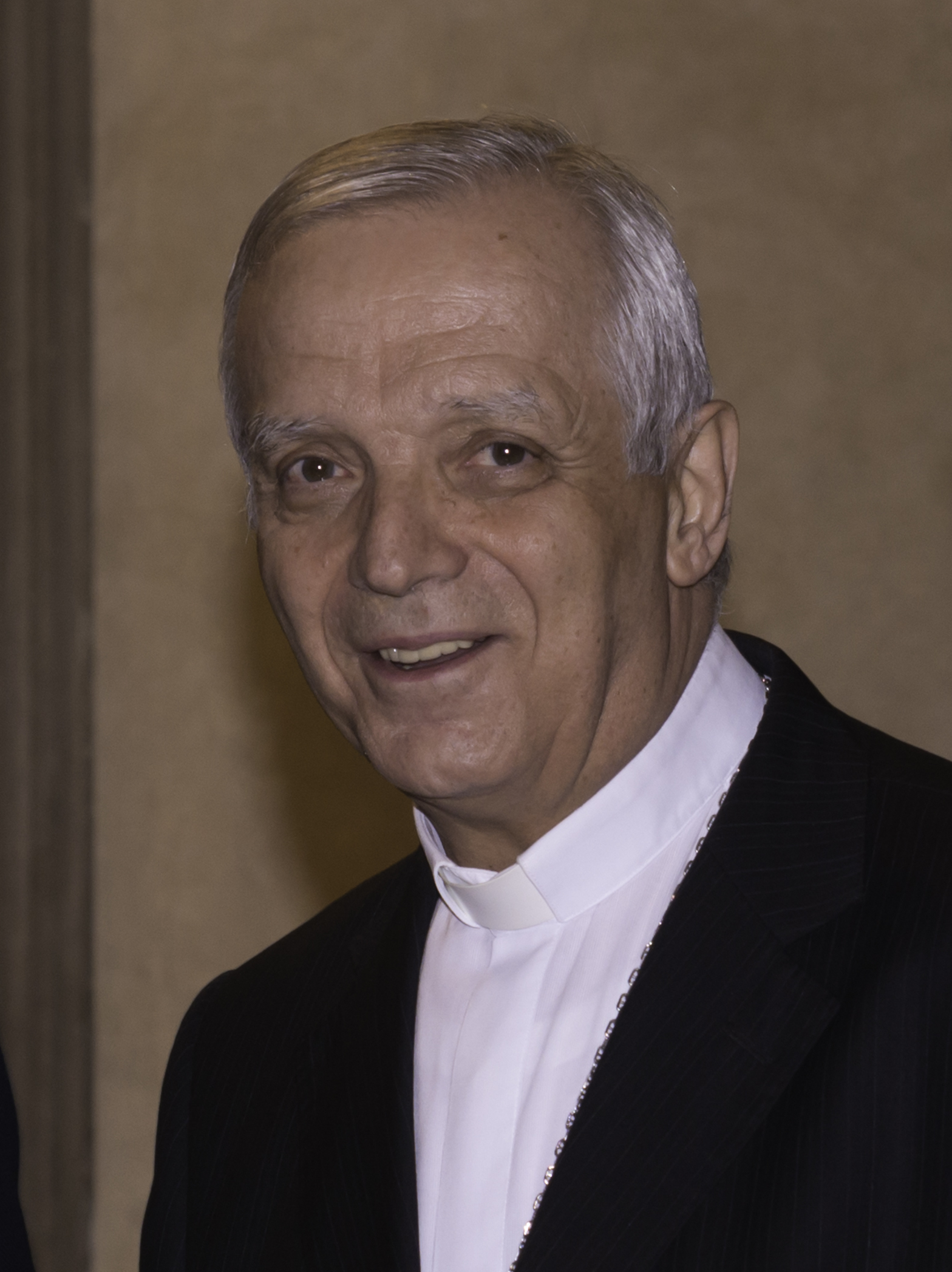
- Diocese: Fiesole
- Appointed: 13 February 2010
- Installed: 18 April 2010
- Term ended: 21 April 2022
- Predecessor: Luciano Giovannetti
- Successor: Stefano Manetti
- Other post: Vice President of the Italian Episcopal Conference
- Previous post: Bishop of Pitigliano-Sovana-Orbetello (1996–2010)

Personal details
- Born: 17 November 1946 (age 80) Legoli, Peccioli, Tuscany
- Denomination: Roman Catholic
- Motto: Pax et Lux; English: Peace and Light
- Coat of arms: Mario Meini's coat of arms

Ordination history
History
Episcopal consecration
- Principal consecrator: Vasco Giuseppe Bertelli
- Co-consecrators: Ovidio Lari; Antoni Bagnoli
Episcopal succession
Bishops consecrated by Mario Meini as principal consecrator
- Guglielmo Borghetti: 15 September 2010

Mario Meini (born 17 November 1946) is an Italian ordinary of the Catholic Church and the Bishop Emeritus of Fiesole.

== Biography ==
Mario Meini was born on 17 November 1946 in Legoli, a village in the Italian comune of Peccioli, which is located in Tuscany. He received his secondary education at the Minor Seminary of Volterra and studied theology at the Pontifical Regional Seminary "Pius XII" of Siena. He later received a doctorate in theology at the Pontifical Gregorian University in Rome.

As such, on 27 June 1971, Meini was ordained a Catholic priest in the Diocese of Volterra. On 13 July 1996, Pope John Paul II announced that he would appoint Meini to succeed Giacomo Babini as Bishop of Pitigliano-Sovana-Orbetello.

On 7 September 1996, he was consecrated a bishop, the principal consecrator being Vasco Giuseppe Bertelli, Bishop of Volterra, and the co-consecrators being Ovidio Lari and Antonio Bagnoli, Bishops Emeriti of Aosta and Fiesole, respectively. As bishop, Meini took the Latin motto "Pax et Lux," which in English means "Peace and Light."

Following a pastoral visit on 25 May 2002, Meini announced that there would be a diocesan synod, and promulgated the synodal documents on 22 March 2005.

Pope Benedict XVI. appointed Meini to succeed Luciano Giovannetti as Bishop of Fiesole on 13 February 2010. He assumed his bishopric on 18 April 2010. Guglielmo Borghetti, for whom Meini had been the principal consecrator on 15 September 2010, succeeded Meini as Bishop of Pitigliano-Sovana-Orbetello.

On 11 November 2014, Meini was elected Vice President for Central Italy of the Italian Episcopal Conference.

On 21 April 2022, Pope Francis accepted Meini's resignation as Bishop of Fiesole and appointed Stefano Manetti as his successor.

Catholic Church titles
Preceded by Giacomo Babini	Bishop of Pitigliano-Sovana-Orbetello; 1996–2010	Succeeded by Guglielmo Borghetti
Preceded by Luciano Giovannetti	Bishop of Fiesole; 2010–2022	Succeeded by Stefano Manetti
Preceded by Gualtiero Bassetti	Vice President for Central Italy of the Italian Episcopal Conference; 2014–2021	Succeeded by Giuseppe Baturi
