= John Paul II Foundation =

Italian foundation focusing on the Middle East

- Logo of John Paul II Foundation
- Type: NGO, Foundation
- Location: Bethlehem
- Website: www.jpii.ps

The John Paul II Foundation for Development and International Cooperation is a foundation named for John Paul II, that was established in Italy, in 2007. Foundation's base for the Middle East is placed in the city of Bethlehem. The foundation's main goal is to invest in the human capacity building. The John Paul II Foundation considers human as the building block of its growth. It as well organizes various programmes which aim to contribute the knowledge, resources and the infrastructure for the development on both individual and community levels.

== Mission ==
The John Paul II Foundation for Development and International Cooperation conducts various development programmes which aim for the overall progress and human and community advancement especially in the Middle East. The foundation bases all it acts on this approach and strives to improve the area through its main branch in the Middle East which operates in the city of Bethlehem.

== Board of directors ==
- H.E. Mons. Luciano Giovanetti
- Fr. Ibrahim Faltas o.f.m.
- H.E. Mons. Rodolfo Cetoloni
- Mons. Giovanni Sassolini
- Rosa Carbone
- Andrea Verdi

== Programmes ==
- Children without Borders
- Football Academy
- Visitor Information Center

== Partners ==
- Custodia Terræ Sanctæ
- ADiSU (Agenzia Per il Ditto Allo Studio Universitatio dell’Umbria)
- ACLI (Associazioni Cristiani Lavoratori Italiani)
- Universita per Stranieri Perugia
- Palestinian Football Association
- Trentino
- Provincia di Firenze
