= Giovanni Roncari =

Italian Catholic bishop

His Excellency, The Most Reverend Giovanni Roncari, O.F.M. Cap.
- Bishop of Pitigliano-Sovana-Orbetello
- Diocese: Pitigliano-Sovana-Orbetello
- Appointed: 1 October 2015
- Installed: 29 November 2015
- Predecessor: Guglielmo Borghetti

Personal details
- Born: 19 August 1949 (age 77) Verona, Veneto, Italy
- Denomination: Roman Catholic
- Education: Pontifical Gregorian University
- Motto: In Caritate et Laetitia transl. In Love and Joy
- Coat of arms: Giovanni Roncari, O.F.M. Cap.'s coat of arms

Giovanni Roncari (born 19 August 1949) is an Italian ordinary of the Catholic Church and a member of the Capuchin order. He is the current Bishop of Pitigliano-Sovana-Orbetello.

== Biography ==
Ordination history of Giovanni Roncari
History
Priestly ordination
- Place: Viterbo, Lazio, Italy
Episcopal consecration
- Principal consecrator: Giuseppe Betori
- Co-consecrators: Mario Meini, Guglielmo Borghetti
- Place: Florence Cathedral, Florence, Italy

Roncari was born in Verona in Veneto, Italy on 19 August 1949. He moved with his family to Florence and entered the seminary of the Order of Friars Minor Capuchin, beginning his novitiate in 1966. He made his first religious profession on 15 July 1966.

=== Priestly ministry ===
After graduating from a liceo classico, he obtained a baccalaureate in theology. He then studied at the Pontifical Gregorian University in Rome from 1976 to 1979, where he received a licentiate in Church history.

He professed his solemn vows in the Capuchin Province of Tuscany on 20 August 1972 and was ordained a priest on 22 March 1975 in Viterbo.

As a priest, he served as chaplain to Careggi University Hospital in Florence from 1975 to 1976 and assistant to young university students in the Convent of Pisa from 1979 to 1980. He also was vice director of theologians, assistant of the Secular Franciscan Order and of the Franciscan Youth of Montughi (Florence), vicar of the parish of St. Francis and St. Clare in Montughi from 1984 to 1988, and professor of church history at the Theological Faculty of Central Italy starting in 1988.

Roncari was nominated as the pastor of the parish of St. Francis and St. Clare in Montughi in 1992. From 1998 to 2005, he was a delegate of the Archdiocese of Florence for the apostolate of the laity and was an ecclesiastical assistant of the diocesan council for lay associations. He was a member of the college of consultors in Florence from 2002 to 2015 and was Episcopal Vicar for the clergy of Florence.

=== Episcopal ministry ===
On 1 October 2015, Pope Francis appointed Roncari the Bishop of Pitigliano-Sovana-Orbetello, succeeding Guglielmo Borghetti. On 21 November 2015, he was consecrated a bishop in the Cathedral of Santa Maria del Fiore in Florence by Cardinal Giuseppe Betori, with Bishops Mario Meini and Guglielmo Borghetti as co-consecrators (both of whom were his immediate predecessors as Bishop of Pitigliano-Sovana-Orbetello). He took as his episcopal motto "In Caritate et Laetitia," which translates from Latin as "In Love and Joy." On 29 November, he took possession of the diocese.

Catholic Church titles
Preceded by Guglielmo Borghetti	Bishop of Pitigliano-Sovana-Orbetello; 2015–present	Incumbent
