= Ibrahim Faltas =

Egyptian Catholic priest (born 1964)

The Most Reverend Ibrahim Faltas OFM
- Custodian of the Holy Land
- Installed: 2016
- Term ended: 2022

Personal details
- Born: February 2, 1964 (age 62) Alexandria, Egypt
- Education: Studium Teologicum Jerosolytanum

Ibrahim Faltas OFM (born 2 February 1964) is an Egyptian Catholic priest of the Franciscan Order.

== Biography ==
From 1969 to 1982 he studied and graduated from the Franciscan School of Kafred Dawar - Alexandria. From 1982 to 1985 Faltas attended the Franciscan Oriental Institute of Giza (Egypt) and graduated in Philosophy. From 1986 to 1988 he performed military service in Egypt. From 1988 to 1992 Faltas studied in Jerusalem at the Studium Teologicum Jerosolytanum obtaining a Bachelor's Degree in Theology. On 28 August 1992 he was then ordained a priest in the Order of Friars Minor - Custody of the Holy Land and from 1993 to 1995 he became director of the Headnurse School in Jericho. Since 1995 Faltas has been Director of the College of the Holy Land in Bethlehem as well as responsible for the Status Quo in the Basilica of the Nativity in Bethlehem. He is an honorary citizen of Terni, Pratovecchio, Montevarchi, Orvieto and Sogliano sul Rubicone.

A Franciscan friar, Faltas is known for having lived and participated in the harsh events of the conflict between Israelis and Palestinians during the armed Siege of the Church of the Nativity in Bethlehem in 2002. In this context he distinguished himself for his quality as a mediator because through dialogue he managed, on that dramatic occasion, to find a solution between the two parties in conflict.

He is the author of the book “The Siege of the Basilica of the Nativity” and of numerous writings on the theme of peace.

Parish priest of Jerusalem from 2004 to 2010, he was the General Treasurer of the Custody of the Holy Land from 2010 to 2016. Since 2016 he has been elected to the Discretorium of the Custody, he is the Director of the schools of the Holy Land and Director of the Casa Nova of Jerusalem; he knows and speaks Arabic, Italian, English and personally follows numerous projects of solidarity, integration and education for peace especially for young people and children.

Faltas was elected Vicar of the Custody of the Holy Land during the 2022 Chapter.
