= Vasco Giuseppe Bertelli =

- Bishop of the Diocese of Volterra
- Church: Roman Catholic Church
- See: Roman Catholic Diocese of Volterra
- In office: 1985 - 2000
- Predecessor: Roberto Carniello
- Successor: Mansueto Bianchi
- Previous post(s): Prelate

Orders
- Ordination: 5 April 1947

Personal details
- Born: 23 January 1924; Pontedera, Italy
- Died: 2 November 2013 (aged 89)

Vasco Giuseppe Bertelli (23 January 1924 − 2 November 2013) was an Italian Prelate of the Catholic Church.

Vasco Giuseppe Bertelli was born in Pontedera ordained a priest on 5 April 1947. Bertelli was appointed bishop of the Diocese of Volterra on 25 May 1985 and ordained on 29 June 1985. Bertelli would retire from the diocese on 18 March 2000.

== See also ==
- Diocese of Volterra
