= Antonio Bagnoli =

Italian bishop

His Excellency, The Most Reverend Antonio Bagnoli
- Bishop Emeritus of Fiesole
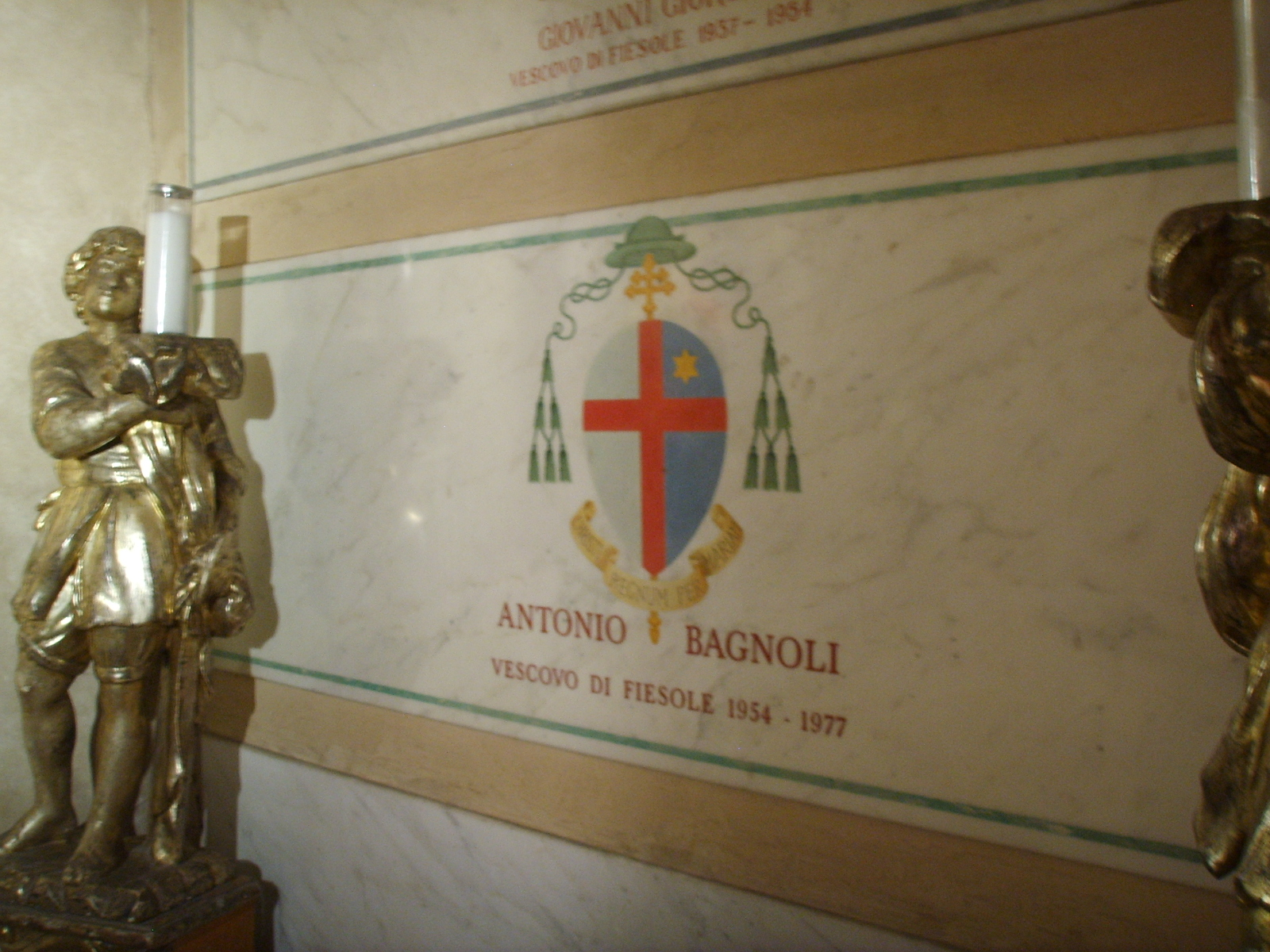
- Bagnoli's tomb with his coat of arms in the Fiesole Cathedral
- Church: Roman Catholic Church
- Archdiocese: Florence
- Diocese: Fiesole
- Appointed: 8 April 1954
- Term ended: 1 August 1977
- Predecessor: Giovanni Giorgis
- Successor: Simone Scatizzi
- Previous post: Bishop of Volterra (1943–1954)

Personal details
- Born: 25 February 1902 Cortenuova, Lombardy, Italy
- Died: 24 December 1997 (aged 95)
- Buried: Fiesole Cathedral

Ordination history
History
Episcopal consecration
- Principal consecrator: Elia Dalla Costa
- Co-consecrators: Ugo Giubbi; Francesco Niccoli

Antonio Bagnoli (25 February 1902 – 24 December 1997) was an Italian ordinary of the Catholic Church. He was the bishop of Volterra and then of Fiesole.

== Biography ==
Antonio Bagnoli was born on 25 February 1902 in Cortenuova, an Italian comune in the province of Bergamo, in the region of Lombardy. He entered the Catholic priesthood and was ordained a priest on 25 July 1925. On 17 August 1943, Bagnoli was appointed the bishop of Volterra. He was subsequently consecrated a bishop on 7 October 1943 by Cardinal Elia Dalla Costa as principal consecrator and Bishops Ugo Giubbi and Francesco Niccoli as co-consecrators.

On 8 April 1954, Bagnoli was appointed the bishop of Fiesole, during which time he participated as a council father in all four of sessions of the Second Vatican Council. He remained as Bishop of Fiesole until his retirement on 1 August 1977, upon which he took emeritus status. On 24 December 1997, Bagnoli died and is interred in the Fiesole Cathedral.

Catholic Church titles
| Preceded by Dante Carlo Munerati | Bishop of Volterra; 17 August 1943 – 8 April 1954 | Succeeded by Ismaele Mario Castellano |
| Preceded by Giovanni Giorgis | Bishop of Fiesole; 8 April 1954 – 1 August 1977 | Succeeded by Simone Scatizzi |
