= Ludovico Buti =

Italian painter

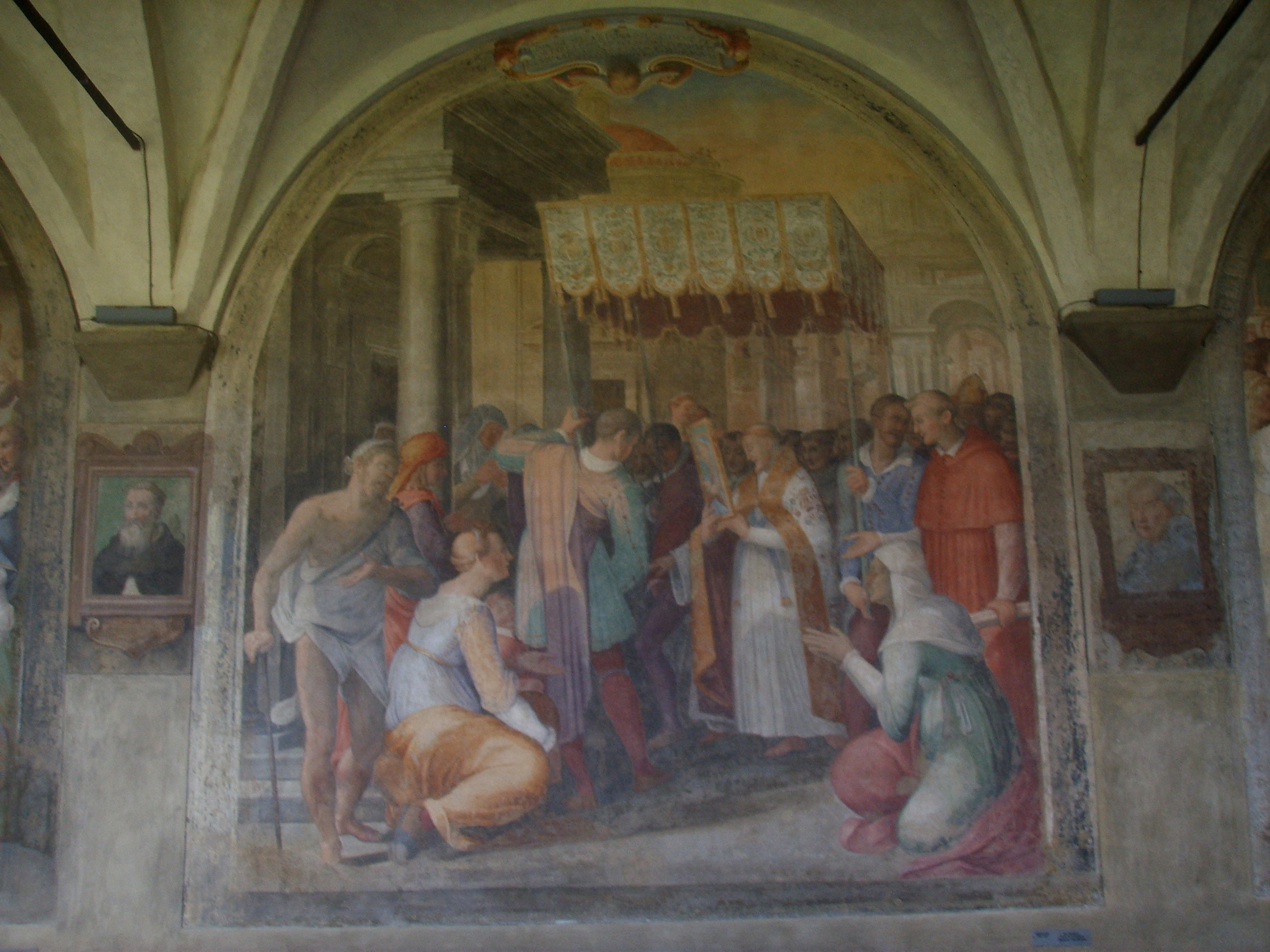
St. Dominic Carrying an Image of the Madonna, Grand Cloister of Santa Maria Novella, Florence.

Ludovico Buti (c. 1560 - after 1611) was an Italian painter, active mostly in Florence.

Belonging to the late-Mannerist period, he worked along with more famous figures as Alessandro Allori, Bernardino Poccetti or Santi di Tito on large projects, including the decoration of certain ceilings of the Uffizi and the Grand Cloister of Santa Maria Novella. In 1589, the duke Ferdinando I commissioned the decoration of the Map Room and the Stanzino delle Matematiche, following a design by Stefano Buonsignori. There is a fresco by Buti on the Annunciation at the Basilica of Our Lady of Humility in Pistoia, as well as the cathedral at Fiesole.
