= Diocese of Fiesole =

Roman Catholic diocese in Italy

Coordinates: 43.8000°N 11.3000°E

Diocese of Fiesole Dioecesis Fesulana

Catholic
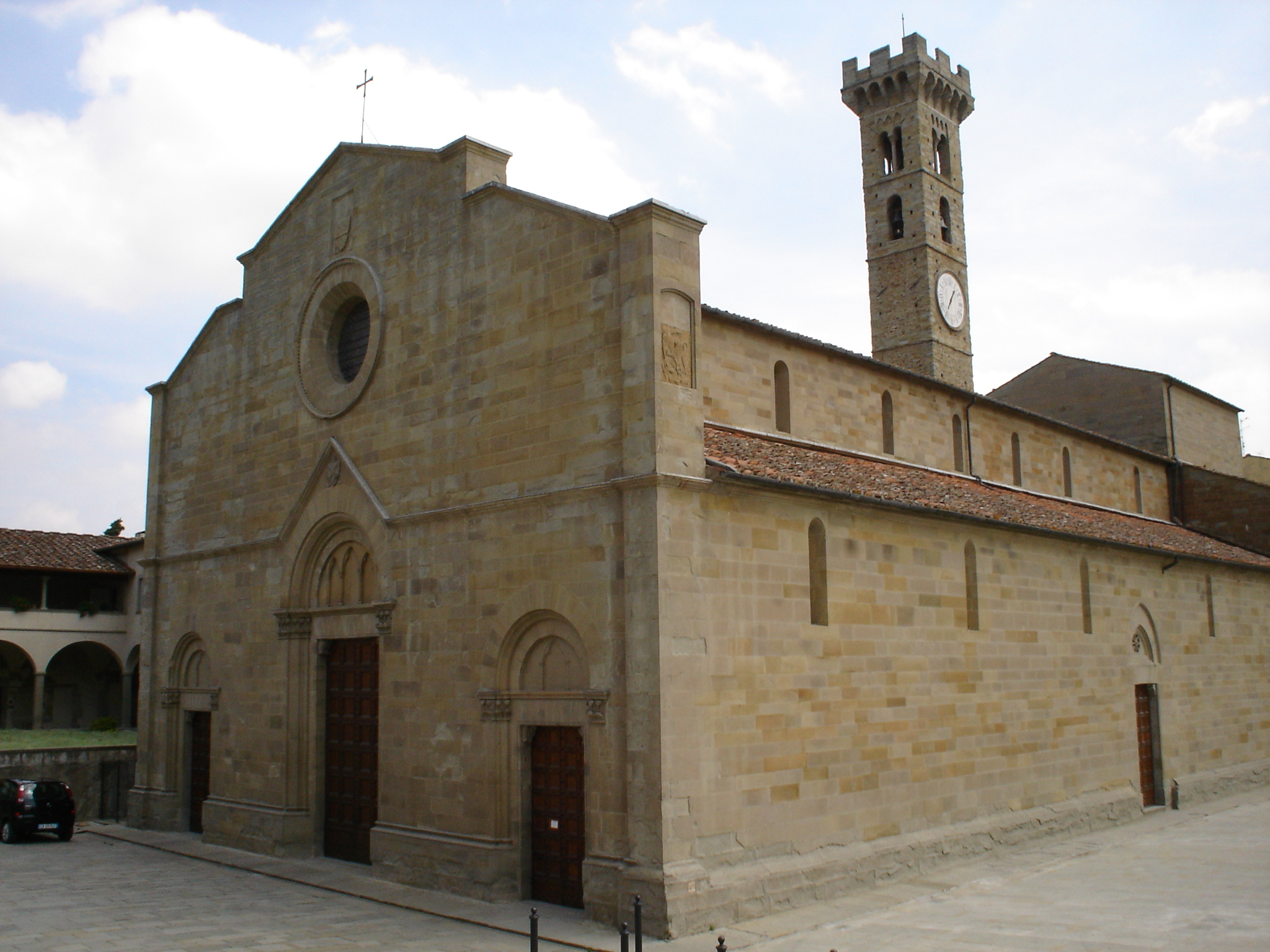
- Fiesole Cathedral

Location
- Country: Italy
- Ecclesiastical province: Florence

Statistics
- Area: 1,300 km^{2} (500 sq mi)
- Population: Total; Catholics: (as of 2021); 155,341; 144,128 (92.8%)
- Parishes: 218

Information
- Denomination: Catholic
- Sui iuris church: Latin Church
- Rite: Roman Rite
- Established: 1st century
- Cathedral: Cattedrale di S. Romolo
- Secular priests: 137 (diocesan); 31 (religious orders); 15 permanent deacons

Current leadership
- Pope: Leo XIV
- Bishop: Stefano Manetti
- Bishops emeritus: Mario Meini

Map

Website
- diocesifiesole.it

The Diocese of Fiesole (Latin: Dioecesis Fesulana) is a Latin diocese of the Catholic Church in Tuscany, central Italy, whose episcopal see is the city of Fiesole. Fiesole was directly subject to the pope until 1420, when the Archdiocese of Florence was created and Fiesole was made one of its suffragan bishoprics, which it still is today.

== History ==
According to local legend the Gospel was first preached at Fiesole by Messius Romulus, said to have been a disciple of St. Peter. Documentary evidence, however, is from the 9th and 10th centuries. The fact that the ancient cathedral (now the Abbazia Fiesolana) stands outside the city is an indication that the Christian origins of Fiesole date from after the period of the persecutions. The earliest mention of a bishop of Fiesole comes at the end of the 5th century, in a letter of Pope Gelasius I (492–496), though the name of the bishop is not given.

A half-century later, under Pope Vigilius (537–555), a Bishop Rusticus is mentioned as papal legate at one of the councils of Constantinople. At the end of the 6th century, Fiesole was destroyed in the Lombard invasions, and its surviving population fled to Luni. There appears to have been no bishop of Fiesole in 599, when a priest and a deacon of the clergy of Fiesole, who were trying to rebuild the churches, which lay in ruins. They appealed for help to Pope Gregory I, who wrote a letter in May 599 to Bishop Venantius of Luni, asking him to contribute twenty solidi, or more if he has the resources, to the restoration project.

By the mid-9th century, Fiesole had been the victim of an attack of the Normans, who destroyed the archives.

Bishop Donatus of Fiesole, an Irish monk, was the friend and adviser of Emperors Louis the Pious and Lothair I. He was elected after 826, served for forty-seven years, and was buried in the Cathedral of S. Zeno, where his epitaph, which he dictated personally, may still be seen. He founded the abbey of San Martino di Mensola.

Bishop Zenobius in 890 founded the monastery of St. Michael at Passignano, which was afterwards given to the Vallombrosan monks. A second Bishop Zenobius (c. 966–968) established the Chapter of Canons of S. Zeno, who were given a canonica next to the church of S. Maria Intemerata.

Other bishops included Atinolfo (1038), who opposed papal reform.

In 1167, Fiesole became involved in one of its many wars with Florence, and lost. Bishop Rodulfus requested permission from Pope Alexander III to transfer the seat of his bishopric to the more secure castle of Figline, and he is actually addressed in one letter as ep. Figlinense et Faesulano. The pope granted his request and authorized the consecration of the church at Figline as his cathedral and baptistery. He ordered him, however, to leave the monasteries in the area, especially that of Passiniano, untouched. In retaliation the Florentines completely destroyed the castle, and, to prevent its being rebuilt, they compelled the Bishop to reside in Florence at the Church of S. Maria in Campo. The unsatisfactory situation seems to have persisted for some time, for, on 16 December 1205, Pope Innocent III sent a mandate to the Abbot of Vallombrosa and Canon Gualando of Pisa, to summon the bishop and canons of Fiesole and the podestà, consuls, and councilors of Florence to a meeting, to find a suitable place in the diocese of Fiesole to which the seat of the bishop could be transferred. The issues were still precarious at the end of the 13th century, when the bishop of Fiesole had to apply to Bishop Francesco Monaldeschi of Florence for license for the Vicar of Fiesole to conduct an ordination at S. Maria in Campo.

In 1219, Pope Honorius III became increasingly uneasy about reports which were reaching him concerning the activities of Bishop Rainerius of Fiesole. He had fallen prey to his carnal appetites, was behaving like a teenager (in aetate senili juveniliter operetur), and was spending all his money, and the money belonging to the diocese, on the pursuit of pleasure (carnalibus desideriis, quae militant adversus animam se involvens.). He was giving away church property under the pretense of sale. Pope Honorius therefore commissioned an investigative committee on 10 July 1219, composed of the Carmelite abbots of S. Galgano and of S. Michele, to conduct a visitation of the diocese and ascertain the facts behind the reports. After their report had been completed, they were to fix a day for Bishop Rainerius to appear at the Roman Curia and answer the complaints against him. According to Giuseppe Cappelletti, the trial before the pope was cut short by the death of the bishop.

The new Bishop of Fiesole, Hildebrand of Lucca (elected 1220), was in such poor financial condition because of the conduct of his predecessor that Pope Honorius remarked in a letter to the Abbot of Vallombrosa that he was in such dire circumstances "that he had no place to lay his head"; the abbot was asked to be generous in his assistance to Hildebrand. From the beginning of his episcopate, Hildebrand was harassed in one way or another by the government of Florence. Reports reached Pope Honorius including one from the Bishop of Modena, who had travelled to Florence and witnessed the situation. The Florentines had put Bishop Hildebrand under the ban, and had imposed an outrageously large fine of 1,000 pounds of current money on him. On June 1224, Honorius appointed an investigative commission, led by the Bishop of Faenza, the Abbot of Nonantola, and Master Tancred, a Canon of Bologna, to seek redress of the injuries done to Bishop Hildebrand, and to have the issues submitted to the Holy See (the Pope); he ordered the fine to be cancelled. Hildebrand was exiled by the Florentines from 1224 to 1228, and took his case to Rome. On 25 December 1226, Pope Honorius wrote to the Bishop of Florence, expressing the gravest indignation that the Florentines were doing injury to the Bishop of Fiesole and showing contempt toward the Holy See. He criticized the Bishop of Florence for not restraining his fellow citizens, and ordered him to notify the magistrates that they were to send their procurators to Rome by 1 February 1227, to explain and justify their aggressions against the Bishop of Fiesole. He wanted to bring a definitive end to their quarrels. Pope Honorius, however, died on 18 March 1227.

Bishop Conradus de Penna died in 1312. Even before his death, however, Pope Clement V had reserved to himself the right to provide a prelate to any benefice in the diocese of Fiesole which might become vacant. On Bishop Conrad's death, the Canons of the cathedral Chapter, unaware of the Pope's reservation, elected the Archpriest of the Church of Fiesole, Thedisius, as their new bishop, by the canonical "way of compromise". Thedisius consented to his election within the legal time limit, and, not wishing to go to Avignon himself, sent his procurator along with the procurator of the Chapter to seek confirmation of the election from the Pope. The Pope declared the election void, but nonetheless appointed Thedisius to the bishopric on 20 July 1312.

Andrew Corsini (1352), born in 1302 of a noble Florentine family, after a reckless youth, became a Carmelite friar, studied at Paris, and, as a bishop, was renowned as a peacemaker between individuals and states. He was canonized by Pope Urban VIII.

On 5 May 1639, Pope Urban VIII issued a motu proprio in which he granted Bishop Lorenzo Robbia and his successors as bishops of Fiesole the right to exercise their episcopal powers not only at the parish church of S. Maria in Campo in Florence, which belonged to the diocese of Fiesole, but also, like an Apostolic Delegate, beyond the limits of that parish in every part of the city and diocese of Florence.

From 1637 to 1970, the Diocese of Fiesole operated the Diocesan Seminary of Fiesole, which is located next to the Fiesole Cathedral and near the Church of Santa Maria Primerana in Piazza Mino. Jesuit principles influenced the curriculum from the beginning. The founder of the seminary, Bishop della Robbia, had been educated by Jesuits, and his Constitutions for the seminary mandated the use of the Spiritual Exercises of S. Ignatius.

== Statistics ==
In 1679, Fiesole was inhabited by c. 150 persons. By 1776, the population had grown to c. 200 inhabitants. In 2018, the population of the city of Fiesole was 14,150.

In the early 20th century, according to the Catholic Encyclopedia, the diocese had 254 parishes and 155,800 people. Within its limits there were 12 monasteries of men, including the famous Vallombrosa, and 24 convents for women.

== Bishops ==
=== to 1100 ===
...

- Ignotus (attested c.492)

...

- Rusticus (attested 536)

...
Sede vacante (attested 599)
...

- Teudaldus (attested 715)

...

- Alexander (early 9th cent.)
- Grusolfus (attested 826)
- Donatus (attested 844, 861)
- Zenobius (873–899)

...

- Winizo (attested 966)
- Zenobius (attested 966, 968)
- Eraldus (attested 901)

...

- Petrus (attested 982)
- Raimundus
- Ragimbaldus (attested 1017, 1018)
- Jacobus (attested 1027–1036)
- Atinulfus (attested 1046–1058)
- Trasmundus (attested 1059–1075)
- Wilelmus (attested 1077)
- Gebizo (attested 1099)

=== from 1100 to 1400 ===
- Joannes (attested 1101–1109)
- Joannes (1114–1134)
- Jonathas (attested 1144)
- Rodulfus (attested 1153, 1177)
- Lanfrancus (attested 1179–1187)
- Rainerius (1219)
- Hildebrandus (1220–1256)
- Maynettus (c.1257–1277)

Sede vacante (1277–1282)

- Philippus of Perugia, O.Min. (1282–1298)
- Angelus de Camerino, O.E.S.A. (1298–1301)
- Antonius Orso (1301–1310)
- Conradus de Penna, O.P. (1311–1312)
- Thedisius d'Aliotti (1312–1336)
- Filignus Carboni (1337–1349)
- Andrew Corsini, O.Carm. (1349–1374)
- Nerius Corsini (1374–1377)
- Nicolaus Vanni (attested 1379–1384)
- Antonius Cipolloni, O.P. (1384–1390)
- Jacopo Altovita O.P. (1390–1408)

=== from 1400 to 1700 ===
- Lucas Manzolini (1408–1409)

Antonio Caetani (1409–1411) Bishop of Porto. Administrator

- Bindus Ferrucci (1411–1421)
- Benozzo Federighi (1421–1450 Died)
- Leonardo Salutati (1450–1466)
- Antonio degli Agli (1467–1470
- Guglielmo Becchi, O.S.A. (1470–1481 Resigned)
- Roberto Folchi (1481–1510 Resigned)
- Guglielmo de' Folchi (1510–1530 Died)
- Braccio Martelli (1530–1552 Appointed Bishop of Lecce)
- Pietro Camaiani (1552–1566)
- Angelo Cattani da Diacceto, O.P. (1566–1570 Resigned)
- Francesco Cattani da Diacceto (1570–1595 Died)
- Alessandro Marzi de' Medici (1596–1605)
- Bartolomeo Lanfredini (1605–1614 Died)
- Baccio Gherardini (1615–1620 Died)
- Tommaso Ximenes (1620–1633 Died)
- Lorenzo della Robbia (1634–1645 Died)
- Roberto Strozzi (1645–1670 Died)
- Filippo Soldani (1670–1674 Died)
- Filippo Neri degli Altoviti (1675–1702 Died)

=== since 1700 ===
- Tommaso Bonaventura della Gherardesca (1703–1703)
- Orazio Maria Panciatichi (1703–1716 Died)
- Luigi Maria Strozzi (1716–1736 Died)
- Francesco Maria Ginori (1736–1775)
- Ranieri Mancini (1776–1814)
- Martino Leonardo Brandaglia (1815–1825 Died)
- Giovanni Battista Parretti (1828–1839)

Sede vacante (1839–1843)

- Vincenzo Menchi (1843–1846 Died)
- Francesco Bronzuoli (1848–1856 Died)
- Gioacchino Antonelli (1857–1859 Died)

Sede vacante (1859–1871)

- Lorenzo Frescobaldi (1871–1874 Died)
- Luigi Corsani (1874–1888 Died)
- Benedetto Tommasi (1888–1892)
- David Camilli (1893–1909 Died)
- Giovanni Fossà (1909–1936 Died)
- Giovanni Giorgis (1937–1953 Appointed Bishop of Susa)
- Antonio Bagnoli (1954–1977 Retired)
- Simone Scatizzi (1977–1981 Appointed Bishop of Pistoia)
- Luciano Giovannetti (1981–2010 Retired)
- Mario Meini (2010–2022)
- Stefano Manetti (21 Apr 2022 - )

== Bibliography ==
=== Reference for bishops ===
- Gams, Pius Bonifatius (1873). Series episcoporum Ecclesiae catholicae: quotquot innotuerunt a beato Petro apostolo. Ratisbon: Typis et Sumptibus Georgii Josephi Manz. pp. 749–750. (in Latin)
- Eubel, Conradus, ed. (1913). Hierarchia catholica. Vol. Tomus 1 (second ed.). Münster: Libreria Regensbergiana. (in Latin)
- Eubel, Conradus, ed. (1914). Hierarchia catholica. Vol. Tomus 2 (second ed.). Münster: Libreria Regensbergiana. (in Latin)
- Eubel, Conradus; Gulik, Guilelmus (1923). Hierarchia catholica. Vol. Tomus 3 (second ed.). Münster: Libreria Regensbergiana. (in Latin)
- Gauchat, Patritius (Patrice) (1935). Hierarchia catholica. Vol. Tomus IV (1592-1667). Münster: Libraria Regensbergiana. (in Latin)
- Ritzler, Remigius; Sefrin, Pirminus (1952). Hierarchia catholica medii et recentis aevi V (1667-1730). Patavii: Messagero di S. Antonio.
- Ritzler, Remigius; Sefrin, Pirminus (1958). Hierarchia catholica medii et recentis aevi. Vol. Tomus VI (1730-1799). Patavii: Messagero di S. Antonio. (in Latin)
- Ritzler, Remigius; Sefrin, Pirminus (1968). Hierarchia Catholica medii et recentioris aevi sive summorum pontificum, S. R. E. cardinalium, ecclesiarum antistitum series... A pontificatu Pii PP. VII (1800) usque ad pontificatum Gregorii PP. XVI (1846) (in Latin). Vol. VII. Monasterii: Libr. Regensburgiana.
- Remigius Ritzler; Pirminus Sefrin (1978). Hierarchia catholica Medii et recentioris aevi... A Pontificatu PII PP. IX (1846) usque ad Pontificatum Leonis PP. XIII (1903) (in Latin). Vol. VIII. Il Messaggero di S. Antonio.
- Pięta, Zenon (2002). Hierarchia catholica medii et recentioris aevi... A pontificatu Pii PP. X (1903) usque ad pontificatum Benedictii PP. XV (1922) (in Latin). Vol. IX. Padua: Messagero di San Antonio. ISBN 978-88-250-1000-8.

=== Studies ===
- Bargilli, Federigo (1883). La cattedrale di Fiesole (in Italian). Firenze: Righi. p. 229.
- Cappelletti, Giuseppe (1862). Le chiese d'Italia dalla loro origine sino ai nostri giorni (in Italian). Vol. Tomo decimosettimo (17). Venezia: Antonelli. pp. 1–72.
- Faini, Enrico (2013), "I vescovi dimenticati. Memoria e oblio dei vescovi fiorentini e fiesolani dell’età pre-gregoriana," in: Annali di Storia di Firenze VIII (2013), pp. 11–49. (in Italian)
- Fiesole, una diocesi nella storia: saggi, contributi, immagini (in Italian). Fiesole: Servizio editoriale fiesolano C. Mori. 1986. [31 articles]
- Kehr, Paul Fridolin (1908). Italia pontificia (in Latin). Vol. Tomus Tertius: Etruria. Berlin: Weidmann. pp. 73–117.
- Lanzoni, Francesco (1927). Le diocesi d'Italia dalle origini al principio del secolo VII (an. 604), Faenza 1927, pp. 573–584. (in Italian)
- Raspini, Giuseppe (1989), "La Diocesi di Fiesole nell'invasione francese 1799," Fiesole e la rivoluzione (una pagina di storia durante l'invasione francese del 1799). special issue of Corrispondenza 9, 1989, no 2. [Corrispondenza, Periodico semestrale pubblicato nella diocesi di Fiesole, Edizioni del Servizio Editoriale Fiesolano]
- Richa, Giuseppe (1758). Notizie istoriche delle chiese fiorentine divise ne'suoi quartieri (in Italian). Vol. Tomo settimo (7). Firenze: Viviani. pp. 173–195.
- Schwartz, Gerhard (1907). Die Besetzung der Bistümer Reichsitaliens unter den sächsischen und salischen Kaisern: mit den Listen der Bischöfe, 951-1122. Leipzig: B.G. Teubner. pp. 219–221. (in German)
- Ughelli, Ferdinando; Coleti, Niccolò (1718). Italia sacra sive De episcopis Italiæ, et insularum adjacentium (in Latin). Vol. Tomus tertius (3). Venice: apud Sebastianum Coleti. pp. 210–268.
- Verrando, Giovanni Nino (2000). "I due leggendari di Fiesole". Aevum. 74 (2): 443–491. JSTOR 20861081.
