= Rodolfo Cetoloni =

Italian bishop

Rodolfo Cetoloni OFM
- Bishop Emeritus of Grosseto
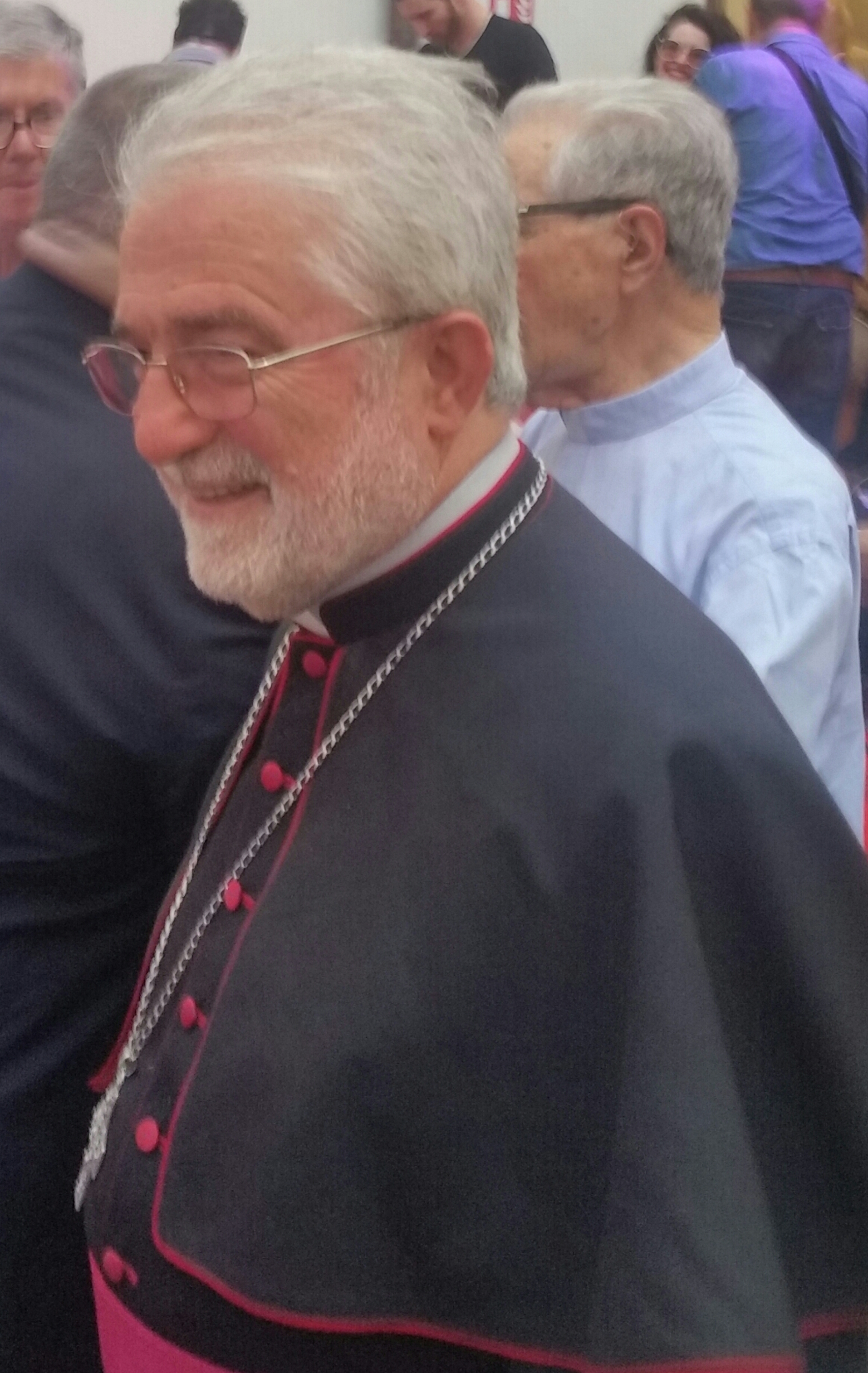
- Cetoloni in 2019
- Church: Catholic Church
- Diocese: Diocese of Grosseto
- In office: 28 May 2013 – 19 June 2021
- Predecessor: Franco Agostinelli
- Successor: Giovanni Roncari
- Previous post: Bishop of Montepulciano–Chiusi–Pienza (2000-2013)

Orders
- Ordination: 26 June 1973 by Ferdinando Fulgenzio Pasini
- Consecration: 20 May 2000 by Silvano Piovanelli

Personal details
- Born: 3 January 1946 (age 80) Badia a Ruoti (south of Bucine), Province of Arezzo, Kingdom of Italy

Rodolfo Cetoloni (born 3 January 1946) is an Italian Roman Catholic prelate. He served as bishop of Montepulciano-Chiusi-Pienza from 2000 to 2013 and Grosseto from 2013 to 2021.
