= Paolo Galeazzi =

Italian bishop (1885–1971)

His Excellency, The Most Reverend Paolo Galeazzi
- Bishop of Grosseto
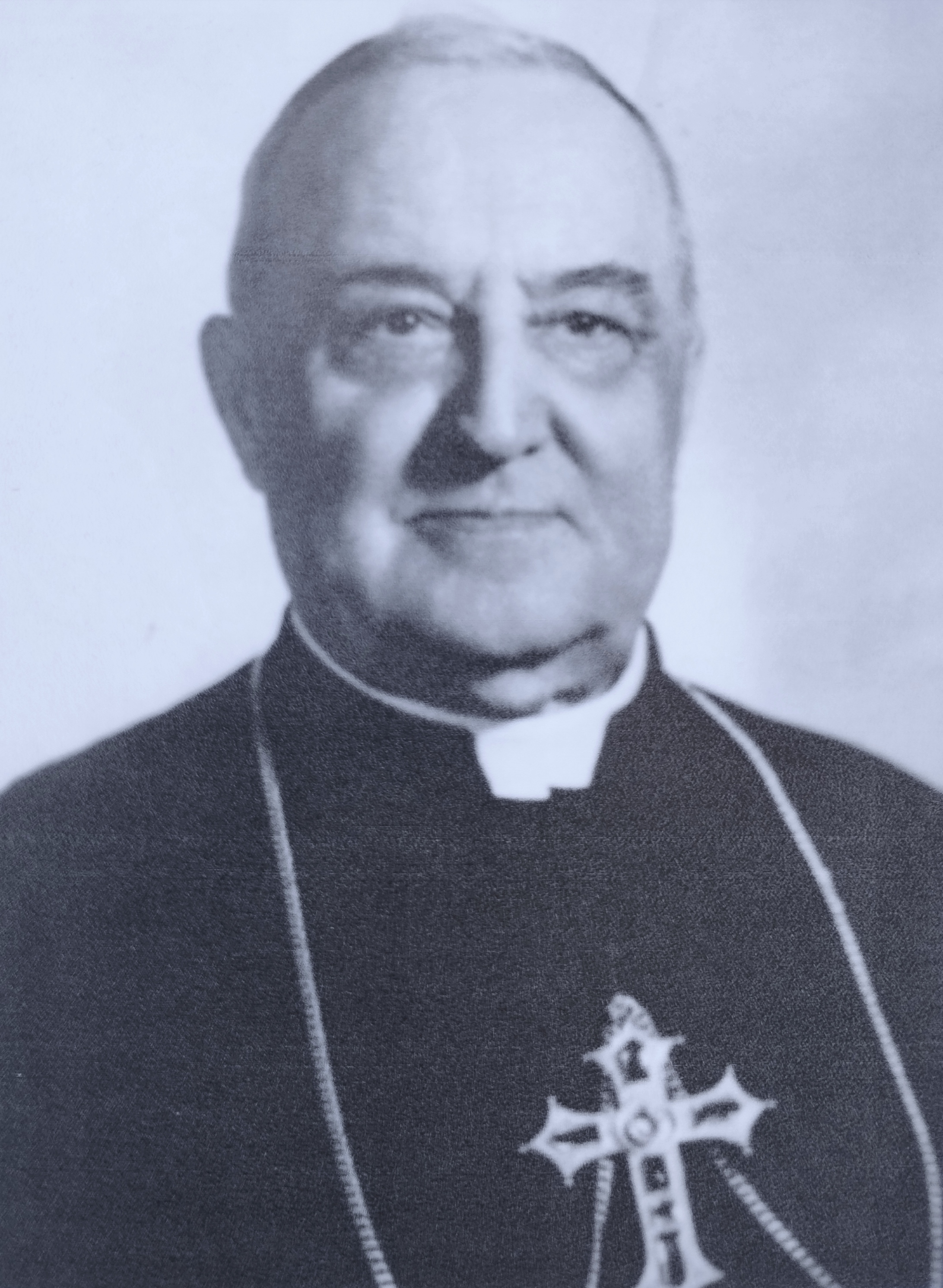
- Church: Catholic Church
- Diocese: Diocese of Grosseto
- Appointed: 16 September 1932
- In office: 1932–1971
- Predecessor: Gustavo Matteoni
- Successor: Primo Gasbarri

Orders
- Ordination: 27 June 1909
- Consecration: 28 October 1932 by Cesare Boccoleri

Personal details
- Born: 20 December 1885 San Gemini, Kingdom of Italy
- Died: 10 August 1971 (aged 85) Marina di Grosseto, Grosseto, Italy

Paolo Galeazzi (20 December 1885 – 10 August 1971) was an Italian Roman Catholic prelate. He was bishop of Grosseto from 1932 to 1971.

== Biography ==
Born in San Gemini, in Umbria, on 20 December 1885, to Angelo Galeazzi and Degna Gentili, he moved to Turin in 1898 to begin his religious studies at the Little House of Divine Providence, thanks to the intervention of Cesare Boccanera, Bishop of Narni. After graduating in theology and canon law from the archiepiscopal seminary of Turin, he was ordained a priest on 27 June 1909. He taught in the seminaries of Terni and Narni and at the Ghislieri College in Rome, before being appointed pastor of the Narni Cathedral. During World War I, he served as a military chaplain for the Bersaglieri. In 1924, Bishop Cesare Boccoleri appointed him Vicar General of the Diocese of Narni.

On 16 September 1932, Pope Pius XI appointed him Bishop of Grosseto. He received episcopal consecration on 28 October 1932, from Bishop Cesare Boccoleri, with co-consecrators Bishops Francesco Maria Berti and Federico Emmanuel.

During his long episcopate, the Diocese of Grosseto underwent significant transformation and innovation, thanks to numerous pastoral initiatives and the extensive construction of churches and diocesan structures. His first major project was the reopening of the diocesan seminary, which became operational in 1936. On 19 March 1938, he established the new parish of St. Joseph in Grosseto. On 9 April of the same year, marking the eight-hundredth anniversary of the relocation of the Rusellae episcopal seat, he established a new parish in Roselle dedicated to the Immaculate Conception. He also established the parishes of Braccagni, Ribolla (1941), and San Donato (1943). During these years, Galeazzi established a collaboration with civil engineer Ernesto Ganelli, who was entrusted with the projects for almost all the new churches built during his episcopate.

In 1943, Bishop Galeazzi decided to lease the summer residence of the diocesan seminary in Roccatederighi to the fascist Italian Social Republic (RSI) to be used as a concentration camp for Jewish detainees. The lease agreement, signed by the bishop and the Public Security Marshal Gaetano Rizziello, director of the camp, stated: "Due to wartime emergencies" and "as a special tribute to the new Government", the Curia leased the summer seminary in Roccatederighi for the establishment of the "Jewish concentration camp" at a monthly rent of 5,000 lire, along with the services of five nuns for "kitchen, pantry, wardrobe, infirmary, and maintaining order in the women's dormitories." However, since the RSI never paid the rent, Galeazzi, in a letter dated September 1944, after the liberation, demanded its collection from the Allied Military Government. Eighty Jews were interned in the camp, thirty-three of whom were deported to Auschwitz. Only four of them survived.

After World War II, he oversaw the restoration of the diocesan properties damaged by bombing. He also worked on the reconstruction of the church of Porto Santo Stefano, which was not yet part of the Diocese of Pitigliano-Sovana-Orbetello. He intensified his pastoral activities and continued to establish new parishes in all the villages of the diocese: the parish of Giardino in 1945, those of Pian d'Alma, Marrucheti, and Marina di Grosseto in 1946, and the new parish of St. Giuseppe Benedetto Cottolengo in Grosseto, established on 11 September 1946. In February 1949, he elevated the ancient church of St. Francis to parish status and initiated the project to build a grand church in memory of those who died in the bombings of 1943: the monumental Basilica of the Sacred Heart of Jesus was built starting in 1953 based on a design by Ernesto Ganelli and consecrated by Bishop Galeazzi on 26 April 1958. By episcopal decree on 1 January 1955, he established the parishes of Albinia, Arcille, and Polverosa, contributing to the founding of new villages following the agrarian reform of the Maremma. In 1956, the parishes of St. Joseph in Bagno di Gavorrano and St. Anthony in Olmini di Sticciano were established. He also focused on building rectories, parish halls, and kindergartens, creating one for each parish.

On 1 January 1960, he established four new parishes in Grosseto: the Holy Crucifix for the suburb of Porta Vecchia, St. Lucia for the neighborhood of Barbanella, St. Charles Borromeo for Principina Terra, and St. Vincent de Paul for Casotto dei Pescatori. The last parish he established was that of the Assumption of St. Mary in Nomadelfia, on 1 April 1962.

On 10 May 1963, he suffered a cerebral thrombosis that left him paralyzed for eight years in retirement at his villa in Marina di Grosseto, leaving the administration of the diocese to Apostolic Administrator Primo Gasbarri. He died on 10 August 1971, in Marina di Grosseto, and was buried in the crypt of the Basilica of the Sacred Heart of Jesus on 26 April 1973.

== Sources ==
- Stefano Campagna; Adolfo Turbanti, eds. (2022). Antifascismo, guerra e resistenze in Maremma. Arcidosso: Effigi.
- Giotto Minucci (1988). La città di Grosseto e i suoi vescovi (498-1988). Vol. 2. Florence: Lucio Pugliese. pp. 431–432.
