= San Giuseppe Benedetto Cottolengo, Grosseto =

San Giuseppe Benedetto Cottolengo
- Church of St. Joseph Benedict Cottolengo
- Chiesa di San Giuseppe Benedetto Cottolengo (Italian)
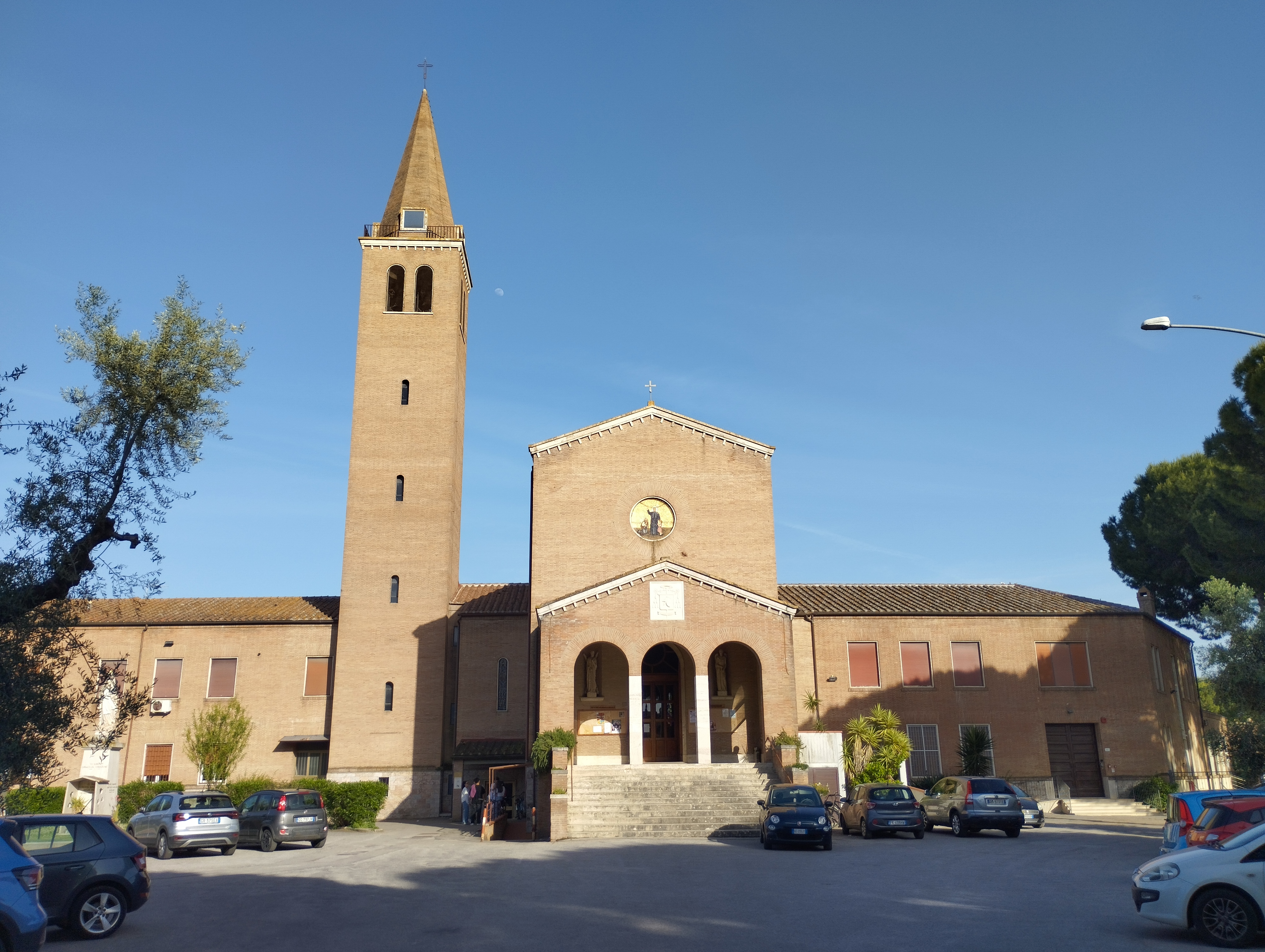
- San Giuseppe Benedetto Cottolengo
- 42°45′41.65″N 11°07′27.28″E
- Location: Grosseto, Tuscany
- Address: Via Scansanese
- Country: Italy
- Denomination: Roman Catholic

History
- Status: Parish church
- Consecrated: 29 April 1951; 75 years ago

Architecture
- Architect: Ernesto Ganelli
- Architectural type: Church
- Style: Romanesque Revival
- Groundbreaking: 1946
- Completed: 1951

Administration
- Diocese: Diocese of Grosseto

San Giuseppe Benedetto Cottolengo is a Roman Catholic church in Grosseto, Tuscany. It is dedicated to St. Joseph Benedict Cottolengo, the founder of the Little House of Divine Providence. The church is situated in the eastern part of the city's urban area, on Via Scansanese, in the Alberino neighborhood.

== History ==
The church was initiated in the 1930s by Bishop Paolo Galeazzi as one of the first two parishes outside the historic center, alongside the church of San Giuseppe in Barbanella. However, unlike the latter, the construction of this church was delayed due to wartime complications, with the cornerstone being laid only after the conflict ended, on 29 June 1946.

Designed by engineer Ernesto Ganelli, the new parish church was intended to serve the eastern part of the city, which was still sparsely developed and characterized by scattered settlements such as the houses along Via Scansanese, the Sfrattati village, and the Sterpeto cemetery. The parish was officially established by Bishop Galeazzi on 11 September 1946, and was legally recognized on 5 June 1948. Construction took five years, and the church was solemnly consecrated on 29 April 1951.

In the 1950s, the church underwent further decoration both inside and out, including the addition of an organ (1951), a baptistery (1952), Stations of the Cross (1954), a large wooden crucifix, an external monument to the Immaculate Mary (1958), and a mosaic in the apse (1959). In 1960, an exterior plaza in front of the entrance was created.

The entire complex was restored in 1990, including the renovation of the presbyteral area.

== Description ==
The church of San Giuseppe Benedetto Cottolengo, designed in the Romanesque Revival style, features distinctive brickwork on both its exterior and parts of its interior. The façade includes a vaulted portico with a staircase and three tiers of full arches, topped by the coat of arms of Bishop Galeazzi. The central part of the façade has an entrance portal with a full arch, flanked by niches with statues, and is topped by a circular rose window with a mosaic depicting St. Cottolengo.

Adjacent to the church is a five-tiered bell tower. The lower four tiers have single arches, while the top tier, housing the bell chamber, features a double arch. The tower culminates in a hexagonal pyramid-shaped spire.

Inside, the church is organized into three naves, separated by columns with capitals that support brick-clad arches. The semi-circular apse is decorated with a 1959 mosaic. The interior also contains a processional banner attributed to Ventura Salimbeni, a painting of the Assumption and Coronation of Mary, an organ, and a large wooden crucifix. Many of the original furnishings, including pews, the pulpit, confessionals, and various liturgical items, were designed by Ganelli himself.

== Sources ==
- Diocese of Grosseto (1995). Annuario Diocesano 1995. Roccastrada: Il mio amico.
- Celuzza, Mariagrazia; Papa, Mauro (2013). Grosseto visibile. Guida alla città e alla sua arte pubblica. Arcidosso: Edizioni Effigi.
- Enrico Crispolti; Anna Mazzanti; Luca Quattrocchi, eds. (2006). Arte in Maremma nella prima metà del Novecento. Milan: Silvana Editoriale.
- Guerrini, Giuseppe (1996). La Diocesi di Grosseto. Parrocchie, chiese e altri luoghi di culto, dalle origini ai nostri giorni. Roccastrada: Il mio amico.
- Parisi, Marcella (2001). Grosseto dentro e fuori porta. L'emozione e il pensiero. Siena: C&P Adver Effigi.
