= Medaglia Miracolosa, Grosseto =

Medaglia Miracolosa
- Church of the Miracolous Medal
- Chiesa della Medaglia Miracolosa (Italian)
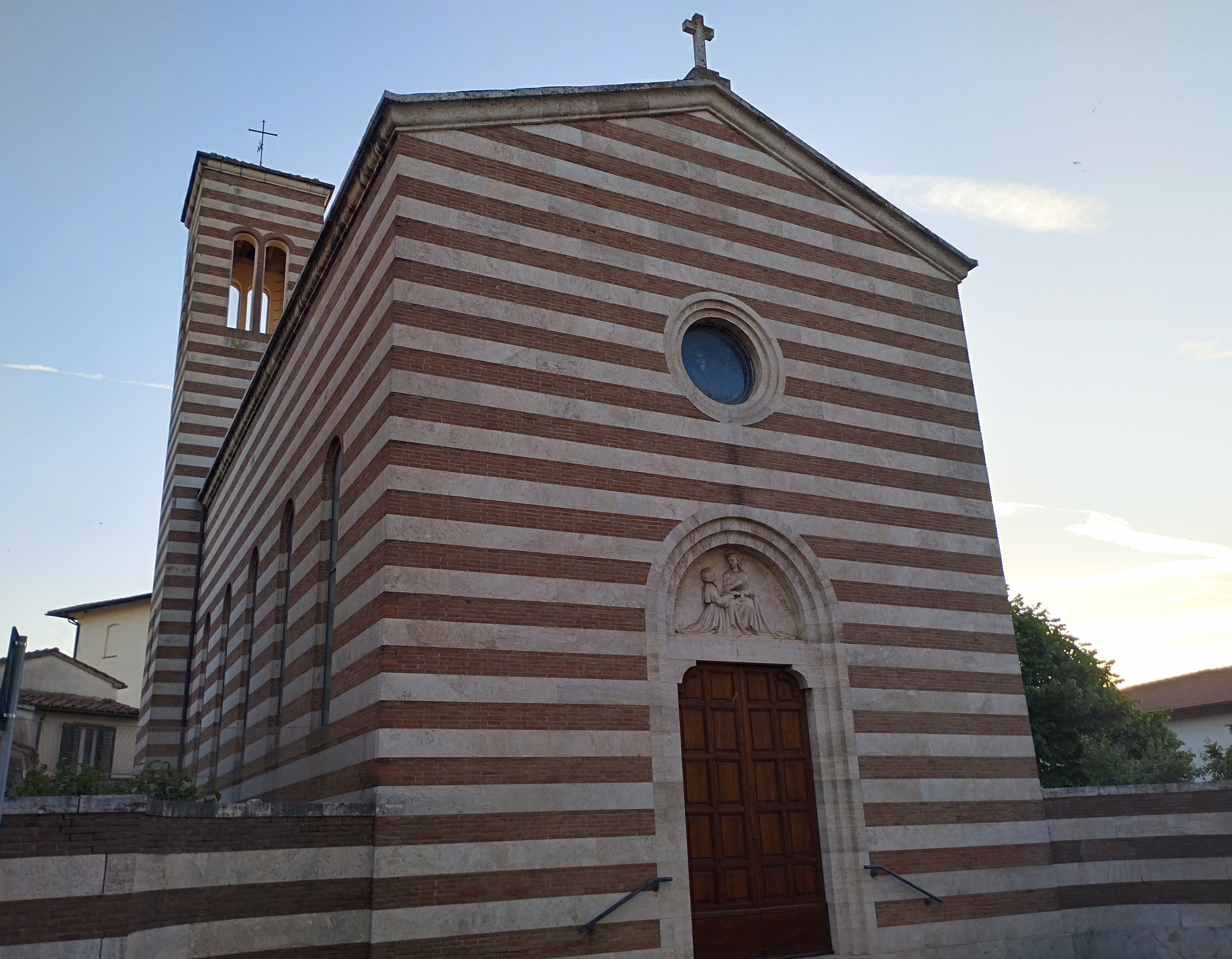
- Medaglia Miracolosa
- 42°45′52.81″N 11°06′40.86″E
- Location: Grosseto, Tuscany
- Address: Via Roma
- Country: Italy
- Denomination: Roman Catholic

History
- Status: Filial church
- Consecrated: 1937; 89 years ago

Architecture
- Architect: Ernesto Ganelli
- Architectural type: Church
- Style: Romanesque Revival
- Groundbreaking: 1936
- Completed: 1937

Administration
- Diocese: Diocese of Grosseto

Medaglia Miracolosa (Miracolous Medal) is a Roman Catholic church in the city of Grosseto, Tuscany. It is located outside the city walls, in the suburb of Porta Nuova, with the facade overlooking Via Roma. It is the first church in Italy dedicated to the Miraculous Medal, a Marian devotion of French origin.

== History ==
The church dedicated to the Miraculous Medal was established in 1933 by the Daughters of Charity of Saint Vincent de Paul, who had been in Grosseto since 1877 and managed the San Lorenzo girls' orphanage. This initiative coincided with the beatification celebrations of Catherine Labouré.

The construction of the church took place between 1936 and 1937, following a design by engineer Ernesto Ganelli. It soon became the principal place of worship for the residents of the nearby suburban area that was expanding at the time just outside Porta Nuova.

By the late 1950s, with the completion of the Basilica of the Sacred Heart of Jesus on Via della Pace, the church of the Miraculous Medal was made a subsidiary of that parish.

== Description ==
The church of the Miraculous Medal features a single-nave layout in Romanesque Revival style, with a semi-circular apse and a bell tower rising from the rear left. The bell tower is topped with four small windows, or biforate openings, situated on each side at the level of the bell chamber. The bell was donated in 1937 by Countess Ciaia Toncelli, as noted by a plaque at the base of the tower.

The masonry of both the church and the bell tower is distinguished by a striking two-tone effect created by the regular alternation of travertine and brick, which seamlessly covers the entire exterior wall.

The gabled façade features a portico with an architrave entrance, preceded by three steps and topped with a lunette, which is capped by a full arch. Inside the arch is a sculpture by Tolomeo Faccendi depicting Blessed Catherine conversing with the Virgin Mary. At the top of the façade, a small circular rose window is centered. Each of the two side walls features four semi-circular windows, with a circular rose window placed centrally in the upper part, aligned with the one on the façade.

The interior has a single nave with plastered walls. The mosaic floor displays a symbol featuring two hearts and an "M" topped by a cross, with the date 27 November 1830, commemorating the old cemetery built by Leonardo Ximenes that once stood nearby, at the site of the current financial offices building.

== Sources ==
- Calenne, Gaetano (October 2004). "La chiesa della Medaglia Miracolosa a Grosseto". Vincenziana Informazione (8).
- Celuzza, Mariagrazia; Papa, Mauro (2013). Grosseto visibile. Guida alla città e alla sua arte pubblica. Arcidosso: Edizioni Effigi.
- Enrico Crispolti; Anna Mazzanti; Luca Quattrocchi, eds. (2006). Arte in Maremma nella prima metà del Novecento. Milan: Silvana Editoriale.
- Guerrini, Giuseppe (1996). La Diocesi di Grosseto. Parrocchie, chiese e altri luoghi di culto, dalle origini ai nostri giorni. Roccastrada: Il mio amico.
- Parisi, Marcella (2001). Grosseto dentro e fuori porta. L'emozione e il pensiero. Siena: C&P Adver Effigi.
