= Gorarella =

- Neighbourhood
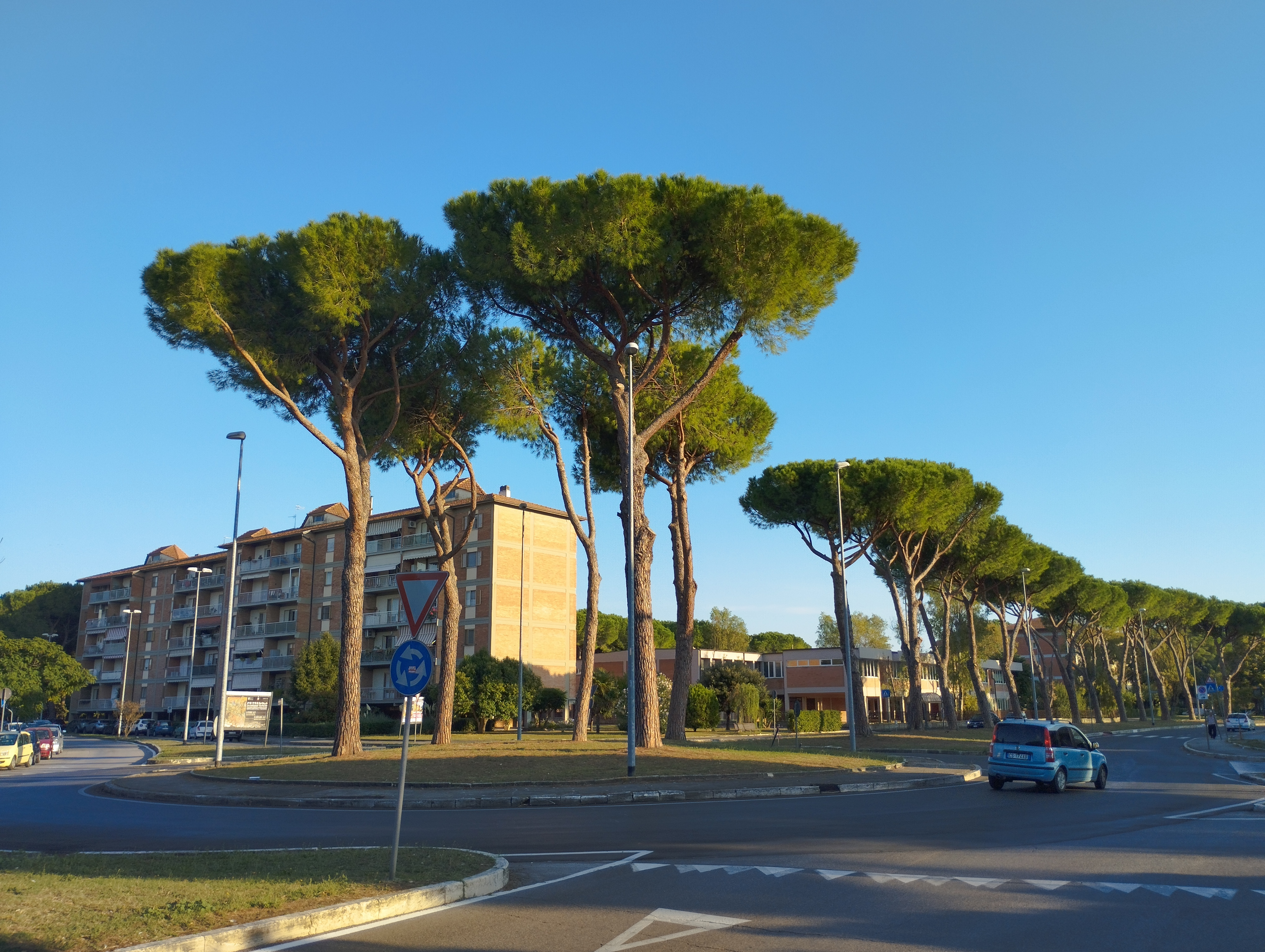
- Interactive map of Gorarella
- Coordinates: 42°45′10.8″N 11°6′12.4″E
- Country: Italy
- Region: Tuscany
- Province: Grosseto
- Comune: Grosseto

Population (2017)
  - Total: 15,000
- Time zone: UTC+1 (CET)
  - Summer (DST): UTC+2 (CEST)

Gorarella is a neighbourhood in the city of Grosseto, Tuscany. The neighbourhood has approximately 15,000 inhabitants and extends over the southwestern area of the urban territory. It takes its name from the historic estate of Gorarella, which was owned by Vincenzo Ricasoli.

== History ==
Gorarella first appears in a document dating back to 15 April 1353, when the municipality of Siena acquired some properties that were owned by Pisa in Grosseto. One of the purchased lands was located, as stated in the document, "in loco dicto a la gora", on the road leading to the ancient port ("via qua itur ad portum") that the city owned on the eastern shores of Lake Prile. Later, it became the property of the Hospital of Santa Maria della Scala in Siena. In 1765, the land of Gorarella was assigned to private individuals by the Grand Duke Peter Leopold.

In 1854, the estate was purchased by Vincenzo Ricasoli, who attempted to revitalize it by introducing the first mechanical harvesting machines. To address the productivity issues of the estate, Ricasoli decided to focus on the experiments of high farming in the Anglo-Saxon model, just as his brother Bettino was doing at the nearby Barbanella estate. The importation of equipment and machinery from France and England was expected to increase production and lighten the human workload, bringing benefits from a capitalist perspective; however, the investment turned out to be a failure. The sudden change in cultivation methods, which had remained unchanged for centuries, was not well received by the local workers, who also boycotted and damaged the machines.

In 1963, architect Luigi Piccinato was called to draft the new general urban plan for the city and personally oversee the design of a modern low-cost housing district, known as "167 Sud 'Gorarella'". The complete urbanization of the former estate thus took place between 1966 and 1982.

== Main sights ==
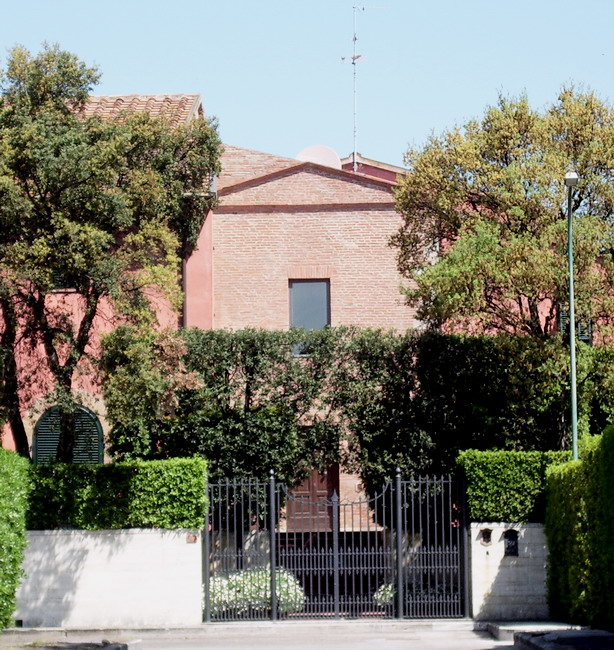
The former church of San Giovanni

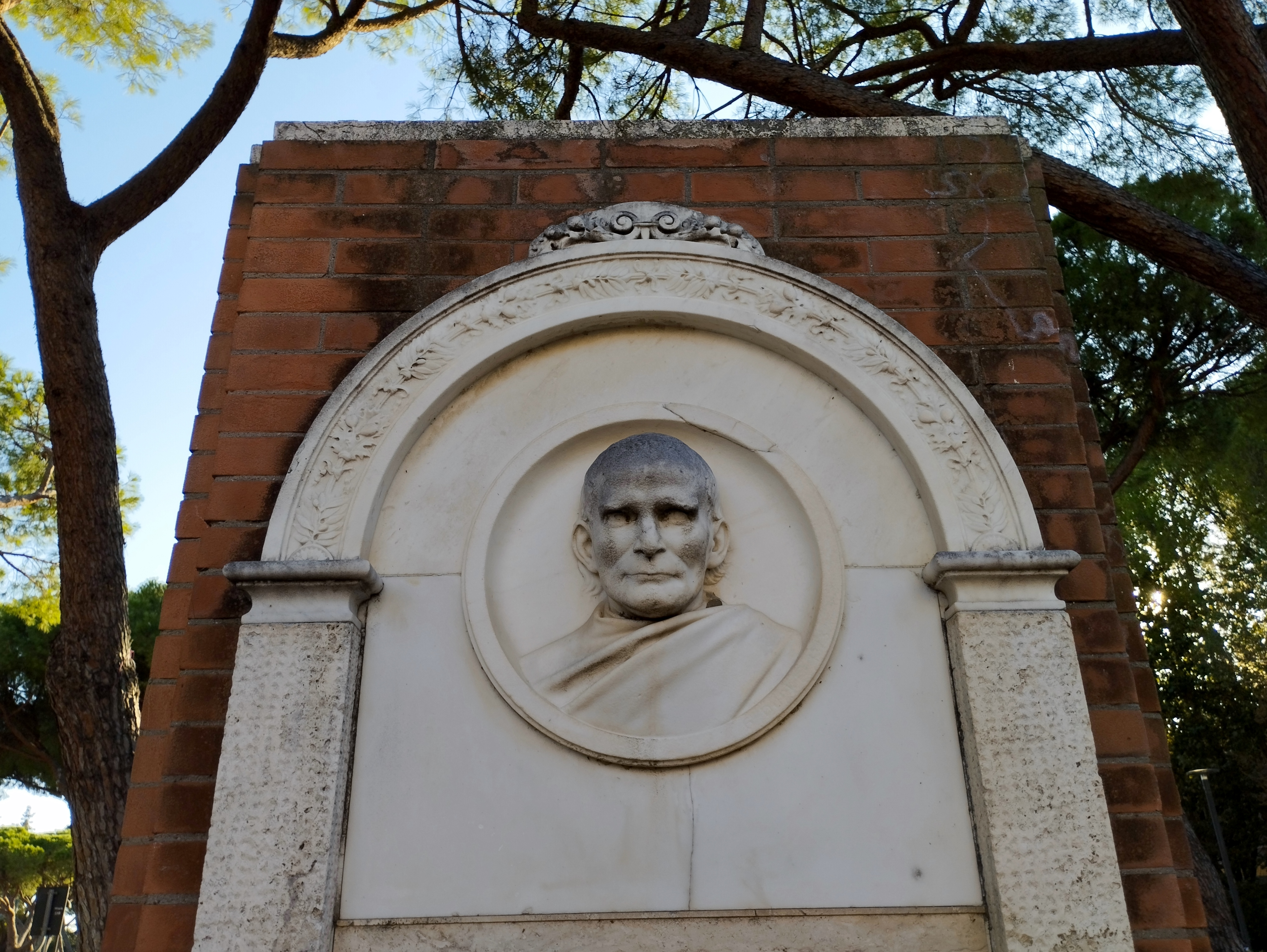
The medallion of Giacomo Grandoni

- Church of Maria Santissima Addolorata (Our Lady of Sorrows): it is the main parish church of the neighbourhood. The church was designed by architect Carlo Boccianti and built starting from September 1969, with the blessing of the cornerstone by the apostolic administrator Primo Gasbarri. It was consecrated on 20 June 1971.
- Former church of San Giovanni (St. John): located on the southwestern edge of the neighborhood, it is incorporated into a villa in the Oliveto residential development. Possibly originating from the 13th century, it is recorded as belonging to the Guglielmites of Malavalle in 1302. In the 16th century, the church was entrusted to the Concini family and later transferred to the Order of Saint Stephen. In the 18th century, it was deconsecrated and transformed into a farmhouse. Part of the structure of the original church was recovered during the renovations to convert the farmhouse into a private villa in the 1990s.
- Fattoria Ricasoli: the former farmhouse is located near the railway bridge and was once the administrative centre of the Gorarella estate, which was purchased by Vincenzo Ricasoli in 1854. Starting from 1997, the Gorarella farm underwent a comprehensive renovation for its conversion into private residences with apartments.
- Villa Pizzetti: the former Giovanni Antonio Pizzetti sanatorium is a historic hospital in the city, inaugurated on 16 November 1936, in the presence of Princess Maria Francesca of Savoy. It is located on Via Cimabue, near San Giovanni, and houses one of the offices of the local health authority Toscana Sud-Est.
- Monument to Giacomo Grandoni: the monument is located on Via Signorini near the stadium, and is made of a brick pillar on which a marble medallion of the politician Giacomo Grandoni has been placed. The sculpture was created by Giovanni Dupré in 1856 and was originally placed in the municipal council chamber of the Grosseto Town Hall.

== Education ==
The schools in Gorarella are all part of the Istituto Comprensivo Grosseto 4, which includes the primary school on Viale Einaudi, the primary school "Gianni Rodari" on Viale Giotto, and the middle school "Dante Alighieri" on Via Meda. The neighborhood is also home to the food and health education high school of the State Institute "Leopoldo II di Lorena".

== Sports ==
In the Gorarella neighborhood are located the main sports facilities of the city of Grosseto, including the Stadio Olimpico Carlo Zecchini, home to the matches of US Grosseto 1912, which also periodically hosts national and international athletics competitions. The Roberto Jannella baseball stadium, one of the largest in Italy, was located on Viale della Repubblica and hosts the matches of Grosseto Baseball Club. A second baseball facility, the Simone Scarpelli Stadium, is located on Via Orcagna.

== Sources ==
- Catalani, Barbara; Del Francia, Marco; Tombari, Giovanni (2011). Itinerari di architettura contemporanea. Grosseto e provincia. Pisa: ETS.
- Celuzza, Mariagrazia; Papa, Mauro (2013). Grosseto visibile. Guida alla città e alla sua arte pubblica. Arcidosso: Edizioni Effigi.
- Enrico Crispolti; Anna Mazzanti; Luca Quattrocchi, eds. (2006). Arte in Maremma nella prima metà del Novecento. Milan: Silvana Editoriale.
- Guerrini, Giuseppe (1996). La Diocesi di Grosseto. Parrocchie, chiese e altri luoghi di culto, dalle origini ai nostri giorni. Roccastrada: Il mio amico.
- Pini, Pier Luigi (1980). "Vincenzo Ricasoli e l'azienda di Gorarella". Agricoltura e società nella Maremma grossetana dell'800. Giornate di studio per il Centenario Ricasoliano (Grosseto, 9-11 maggio 1980). Florence: L.S. Olschki.

== See also ==
- Barbanella
- Sugherella
