= San Giuseppe, Grosseto =

San Giuseppe
- Church of St. Joseph
- Chiesa di San Giuseppe (Italian)
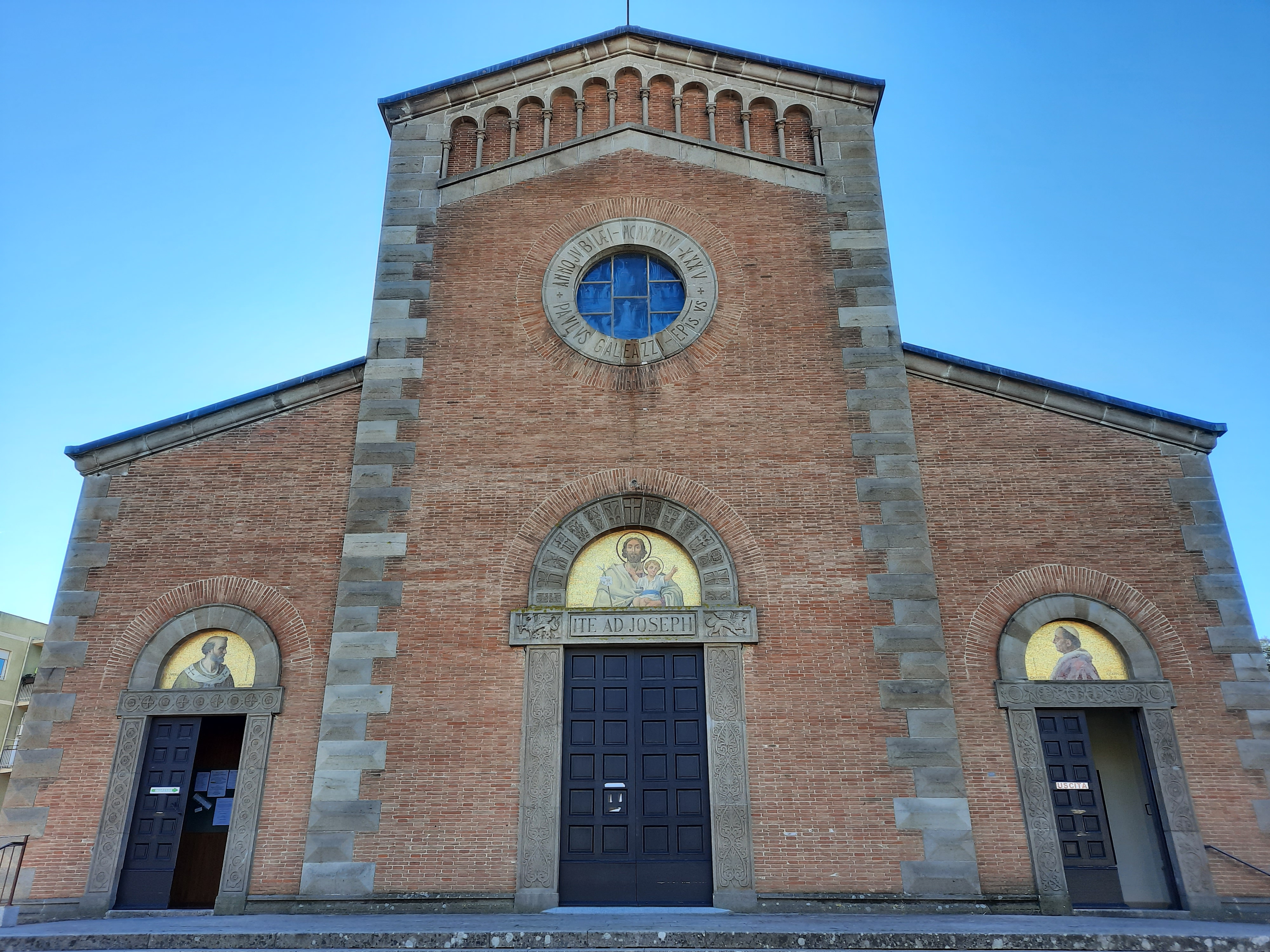
- San Giuseppe
- 42°45′58.19″N 11°06′13.87″E
- Location: Grosseto, Tuscany
- Address: Via Nazario Sauro
- Country: Italy
- Denomination: Roman Catholic

History
- Status: Parish church
- Consecrated: 14 April 1940; 86 years ago

Architecture
- Architect: Ernesto Ganelli
- Architectural type: Church
- Style: Romanesque Revival
- Groundbreaking: 1935
- Completed: 1940

Administration
- Diocese: Diocese of Grosseto

San Giuseppe (St. Joseph) is a Roman Catholic church in the city of Grosseto, Tuscany. Located in the western part of the city on Via Sauro, in the Barbanella neighborhood, it is the first parish church built in Grosseto outside the historic center.

== History ==
The church was built in the 1930s to address the needs of residents in the western part of the city, beyond the Tirrenica railway, in the developing Barbanella neighborhood.

The project was designed by engineer Ernesto Ganelli, and the laying of the cornerstone was blessed by Bishop Paolo Galeazzi on 27 April 1935. The parish of Saint Joseph was officially established on 19 March 1938. The establishment of the parish was intended by the bishop to commemorate the event involving Pope Innocent II, who, on 19 March 1133, issued the papal bull Iustus Dominus in Grosseto, which mediated peace between Pisa and Genoa. Construction, undertaken by the company Angelo Bocelli, lasted five years, culminating in the solemn consecration of the church on 14 April 1940.

The church was closed to the public in October 1978 due to structural safety concerns, following the development of cracks that caused sections of plaster and brickwork to fall. The building underwent a major restoration led by engineer Lamberto Marsili, which included removing the vaulted ceiling, restoring the wooden trusses, and refurbishing the presbyteral area according to designs by architect Father Angelo Polesello.

== Description ==
The church of San Giuseppe is built in a Romanesque Revival style. Bishop Paolo Galeazzi aimed to use an architectural style that stayed as close as possible to the medieval form, which he considered the epitome of "spiritual" architecture. The bishop rejected an initial design by Ganelli presented in 1934, as it was deemed too "modern". This first proposal gave the building an "abstract appearance, characterized by the striking verticality of the high openings in the bell tower and façade, which might have been inspired by Angiolo Mazzoni's Post Office building".

Its façade is organized into three sections that align with the three internal naves, each featuring an architraved entrance with a decorated lunette and a full arch. The central section of the façade is taller and includes a prominent circular rose window, topped by a decorative crown.

The sides of the church, corresponding to the lateral naves, have a series of circular rose windows similar to the central one and biforate windows with columns and arches, which help illuminate the central nave. A central mosaic shows Saint Joseph between Pope Innocent II and Pope Pius XI.

The bell tower, located on the right side of the church, has five tiers with proportionate openings, columns, and arches. The top tier, which houses the bell chamber, features a pentafore, and the tower is capped with a gently sloping four-sided roof.

Inside, the church is divided into three naves by columns made of trachyte and red marble, adorned with detailed capitals in high relief designed by Tolomeo Faccendi. The stained glass windows are a notable feature, harmoniously integrated into the Romanesque Revival design. Each nave concludes with a semi-circular apse.

== Sources ==
- Diocese of Grosseto (1995), Annuario Diocesano 1995, Roccastrada: Il mio amico
- Bambagini, Cecilia; Fommei, Maria Serena; Parisi, Marcella; Saretta, Francesca (1998), La chiesa di S. Giuseppe a Grosseto, Grosseto: Archivio di Stato di Grosseto
- Celuzza, Mariagrazia; Papa, Mauro (2013), Grosseto visibile. Guida alla città e alla sua arte pubblica, Arcidosso: Edizioni Effigi
- Enrico Crispolti; Anna Mazzanti; Luca Quattrocchi, eds. (2006), Arte in Maremma nella prima metà del Novecento, Milan: Silvana Editoriale
- Guerrini, Giuseppe (1996), La Diocesi di Grosseto. Parrocchie, chiese e altri luoghi di culto, dalle origini ai nostri giorni, Roccastrada: Il mio amico
- Parisi, Marcella (2001), Grosseto dentro e fuori porta. L'emozione e il pensiero, Siena: C&P Adver Effigi
