= Adelmo Tacconi =

Italian Catholic bishop (1915–2003)

- Bishop of Grosseto
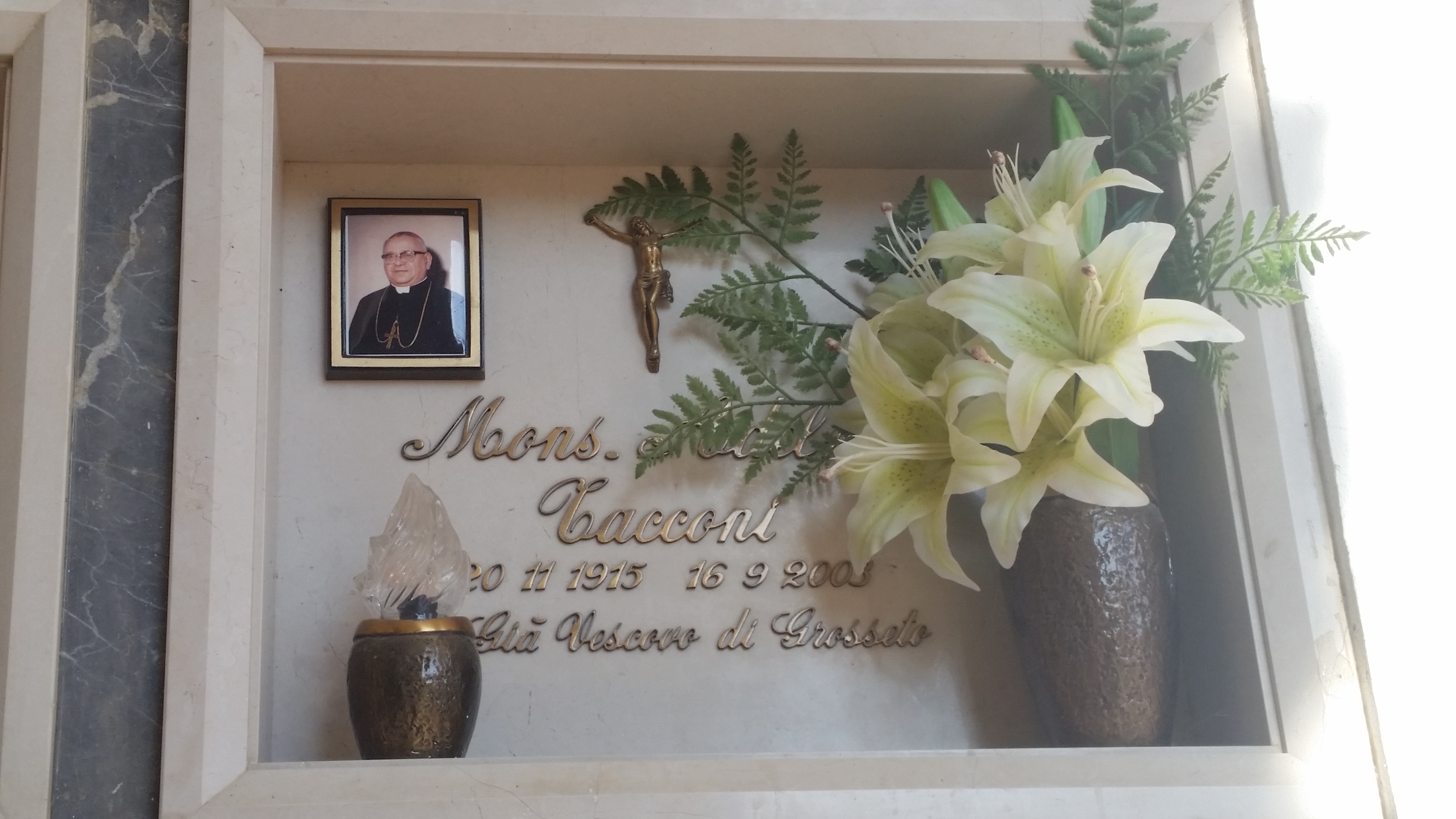
- Tomb of Tacconi
- Church: Catholic Church
- Diocese: Diocese of Grosseto
- In office: 23 March 1979 – 20 July 1991
- Predecessor: Primo Gasbarri
- Successor: Angelo Scola
- Previous posts: Auxiliary Bishop of Grosseto (1975-1979); Titular Bishop of Sinna (1970-1979); Auxiliary Bishop of Sovana and Pitigliano (1970-1975)

Orders
- Ordination: 3 February 1940
- Consecration: 21 June 1970 by Primo Gasbarri

Personal details
- Born: 20 November 1915 Roccastrada, Province of Grosseto, Kingdom of Italy
- Died: 16 September 2003 (aged 87) Grosseto, Tuscany, Italy

Adelmo Tacconi (20 November 1915 – 16 September 2003) was an Italian Catholic prelate. He was bishop of Grosseto from 1979 to 1991.

== Biography ==
Born in Roccastrada in the Maremma, he was ordained a priest of the clergy of Grosseto on 3 February 1940, by Francesco Pascucci, pro-vicar of Rome. In Grosseto, he served as chaplain of the Cathedral of San Lorenzo, becoming its parish priest in 1947, and also held the title of canon theologian of the Chapter. Among the various roles he held during the 1950s and 1960s were vice-rector of the episcopal seminary, administrative head of the Curia, and a religion teacher in public schools.

On 23 April 1970, he was elected auxiliary bishop for the diocese of Sovana-Pitigliano and was consecrated on 21 June with the title of bishop of Sinna by the bishop of Grosseto, Primo Gasbarri, with co-consecrators Bishops Fiorenzo Angelini (later cardinal) and Giuseppe Marafini.

In 1975, he was appointed auxiliary bishop of Grosseto, with the right of succession, and succeeded Bishop Primo Gasbarri on 23 March 1979. During his episcopate in Grosseto, he was notable for the establishment of new parishes, including the parish of the Holy Family in Sugherella. On 21 May 1989, that same church was chosen to host Pope John Paul II, marking the first papal visit to Grosseto in 850 years. By episcopal decree on 19 June 1986, he suppressed the parish of Madonna del Rosario of Pian d'Alma to establish the new parish of La Consolata in Punta Ala.

He resigned in 1991 and was succeeded by Angelo Scola. He died in Grosseto on 16 September 2003.

== Sources ==
- Giotto Minucci (1988). La città di Grosseto e i suoi vescovi (498-1988). Vol. 2. Florence: Lucio Pugliese. pp. 435–436.
