= Barbanella =

- Neighbourhood
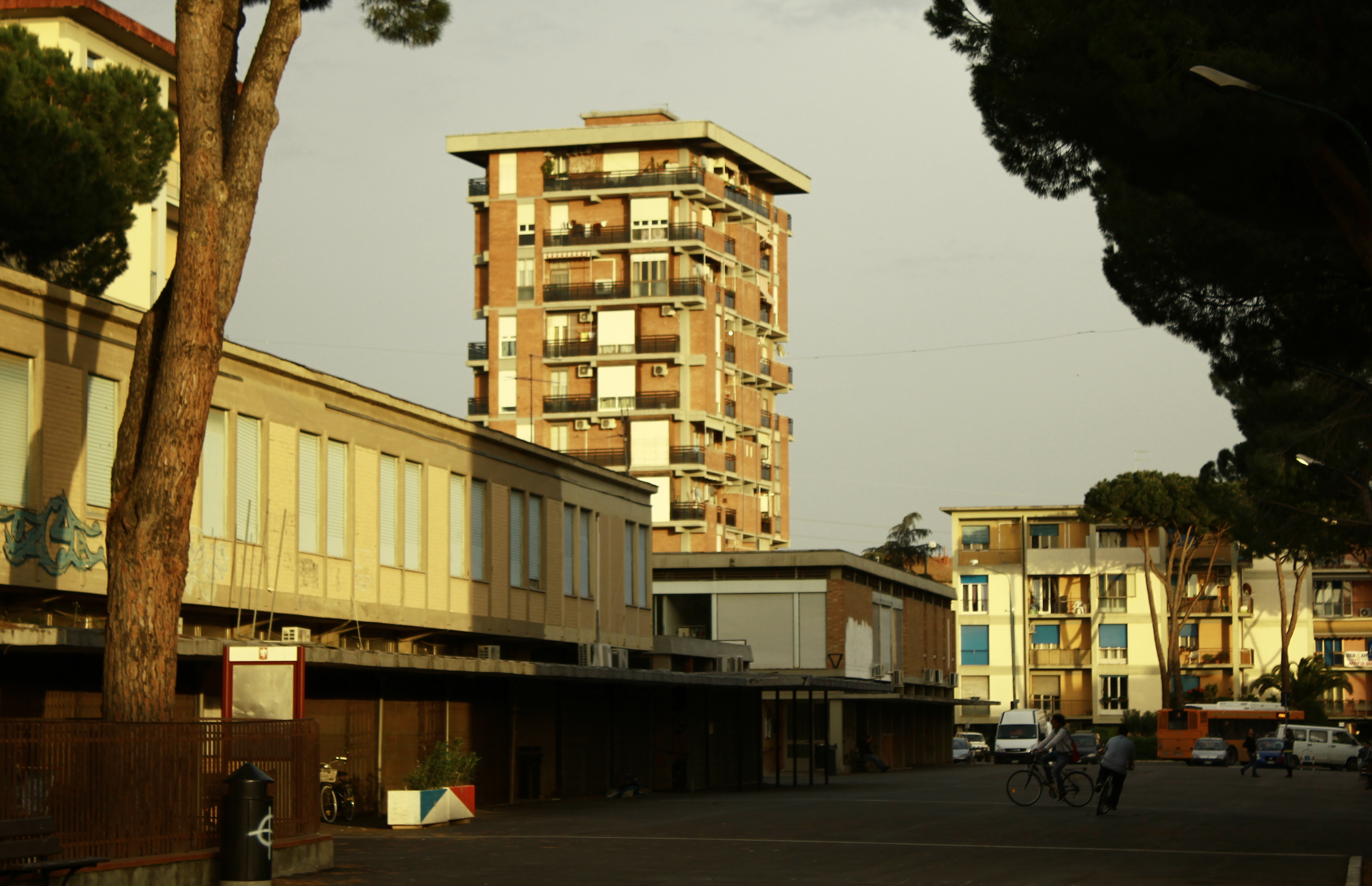
- Piazzale De Amicis
- Interactive map of Barbanella
- Coordinates: 42°46′12.2″N 11°5′50.5″E
- Country: Italy
- Region: Tuscany
- Province: Grosseto
- Comune: Grosseto

Population (2017)
  - Total: 17,300
- Time zone: UTC+1 (CET)
  - Summer (DST): UTC+2 (CEST)

Barbanella is a neighbourhood in the city of Grosseto, Tuscany. The neighbourhood has approximately 17,000 inhabitants and extends over the northwestern area of the urban territory.

== History ==
Barbanella is remembered in the medieval era as marshy land located on the eastern bank of the former Lake Prile, northwest of the city of Grosseto. The first mention of the locality is found in a document dated 8 May 1222, which refers to a "campum positum in contrada que dicitur piscina Barbione". A portion of the land was reclaimed in the mid-13th century by the municipality of Grosseto, which was entrusted to local assignees and designated for cultivation.

In 1828, Grand Duke Leopold II of Tuscany initiated a major reclamation project for the marshland and constructed the Diversion Canal, making substantial improvements for the agricultural development of the Barbanella estate, which at the time belonged to brothers Antonio and Ubaldo Andreini.

The estate was purchased in 1855 by Baron Bettino Ricasoli, who invested numerous resources in agricultural experiments based on the British high farming model, employing a highly mechanized system that ultimately did not yield the expected results.

Throughout the 20th century, due to Grosseto's population growth and the city's industrialization process, Barbanella was incorporated into the city, effectively becoming a neighbourhood. The parish of St. Joseph was established in 1938. In the post-war period, public housing areas were developed north of Via Sauro between 1949 and 1955, and in the area between Viale Giusti, Viale Uranio, Via Cavalcanti, and Via Pascoli between 1955 and 1962. A second parish (St. Lucy) was established in 1960.

== Main sights ==
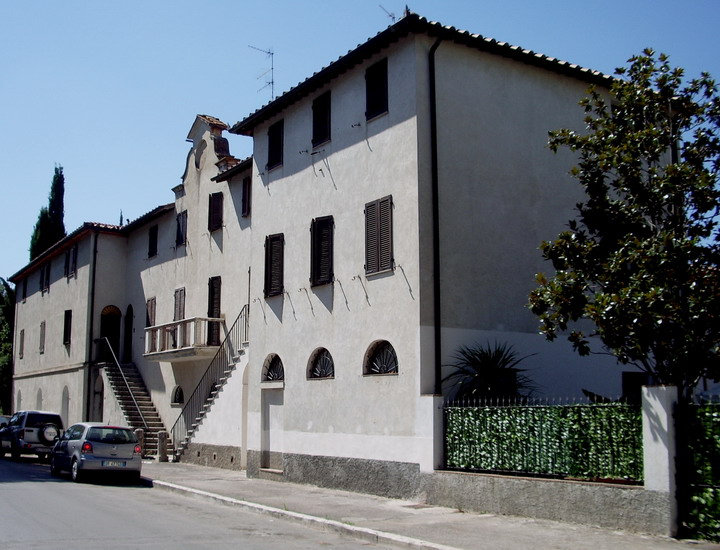
Villa Ricasoli

- Church of San Giuseppe (St. Joseph): it is the first parish church of the neighbourhood, built from 1935 to 1940, on a design by engineer Ernesto Ganelli. The official consecration took place on 14 April 1940.
- Church of Santa Lucia (St. Lucy): it is the second parish church of Barbanella, located on Via Pirandello. It was designed by architects Ilo Dati, Franco Mazzucchi, and Egisto Pierotti, and consecration took place on 4 October 1969.
- Villa Ricasoli: the old Barbanella estate, located on Via Giacosa, served as the manor house of Baron Bettino Ricasoli.
- Palazzina Favi: it is a neoclassical building with Liberty style decorations, located on Viale Etruria, opposite the railway line. Designed by Ivaldo Reggiani, it was built in 1912 as the residence and shop of Orazio Favi.

== Education ==
The schools in the neighborhood are all part of the Istituto Comprensivo Grosseto 5, which includes the primary school "Renato Fucini" on Piazzale De Amicis, the primary school "Paride Pascucci" on Via Rovetta, and the middle school "Giambattista Vico" on Viale Uranio.

== Sources ==
- Agricoltura e società nella Maremma grossetana dell'800. Giornate di studio per il centenario ricasoliano (Grosseto, 9-11 maggio 1980). Florence: Olschki. 1980.
- Catalani, Barbara; Del Francia, Marco; Tombari, Giovanni (2011). Itinerari di architettura contemporanea. Grosseto e provincia. Pisa: ETS.
- Celuzza, Mariagrazia; Papa, Mauro (2013). Grosseto visibile. Guida alla città e alla sua arte pubblica. Arcidosso: Edizioni Effigi.
- Enrico Crispolti; Anna Mazzanti; Luca Quattrocchi, eds. (2006). Arte in Maremma nella prima metà del Novecento. Milan: Silvana Editoriale.
- Guerrini, Giuseppe (1996). La Diocesi di Grosseto. Parrocchie, chiese e altri luoghi di culto, dalle origini ai nostri giorni. Roccastrada: Il mio amico.

== See also ==
- Gorarella
- Sugherella
