= Sugherella =

- Neighbourhood
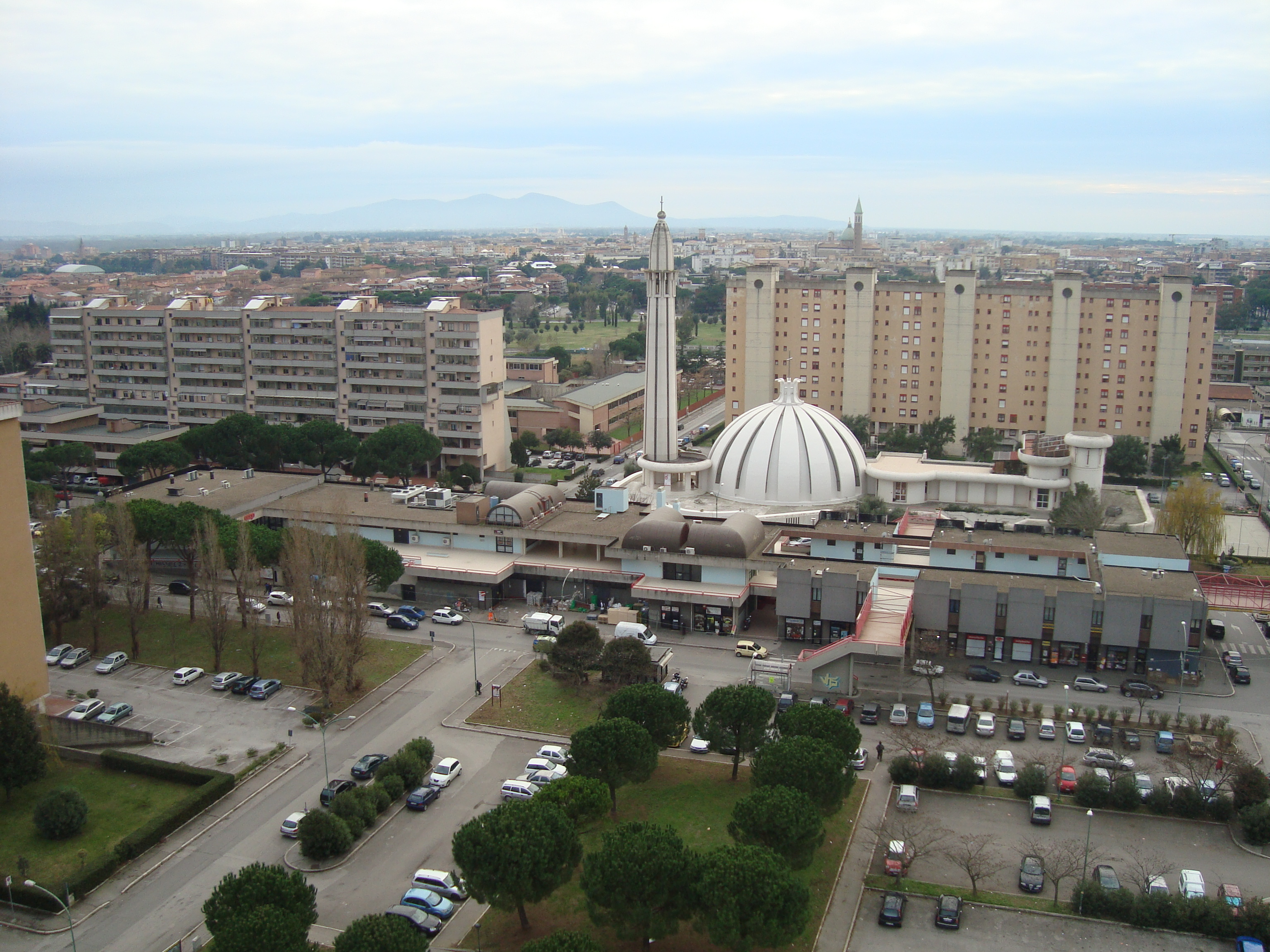
- Interactive map of Sugherella
- Coordinates: 42°46′45″N 11°7′1″E
- Country: Italy
- Region: Tuscany
- Province: Grosseto
- Comune: Grosseto

Population (2017)
  - Total: 18,000
- Time zone: UTC+1 (CET)
  - Summer (DST): UTC+2 (CEST)

Sugherella is a neighbourhood in the city of Grosseto, Tuscany, central Italy. The neighbourhood has approximately 18,000 inhabitants and extends over the northeastern area of the urban territory.

== History ==
The area has been known as the piano della Molla (Molla Plain) since medieval times, as it was crossed by the eponymous ditch that originated from Lake Bernardo, near Istia d'Ombrone, and flowed into Lake Prile. By the mid-17th century, the Sugherella estate was documented among those villages with farms in the plain along the road that connected Grosseto with Siena. The lack of maintenance of the banks and bed of the Molla ditch led to a gradual marshland development in the area, necessitating a long series of hydraulic regulation interventions, culminating in the works carried out by Leonardo Ximenes in the 18th century. Between 1828 and 1830, the Sugherella estate was separated from the city of Grosseto by the route of the Diversion Canal of the Ombrone River. In 1864, the estate became part of the possessions of Baron Bettino Ricasoli, who was already the owner of the Barbanella estate.

In 1964, construction of the Misericordia Hospital began in the lands adjacent to the estate. An initial urban settlement was planned in the master plan drafted by Luigi Piccinato and approved in 1971. The task of designing the modern neighborhood "Zona 167" was entrusted to the newly established association Architetti Riuniti Grossetani (ARG), which included ten architectural firms: Cappelli, Di Salvo, Gentili, Giacolini, Luzzetti, Mangani, Marliani, Moni, Piemontese, and Santini. Work began in 1979 and continued for about a decade, until the completion of the parish church of the Holy Family, consecrated in 1989, the year in which the neighborhood received a visit from Pope John Paul II.

== Main sights ==
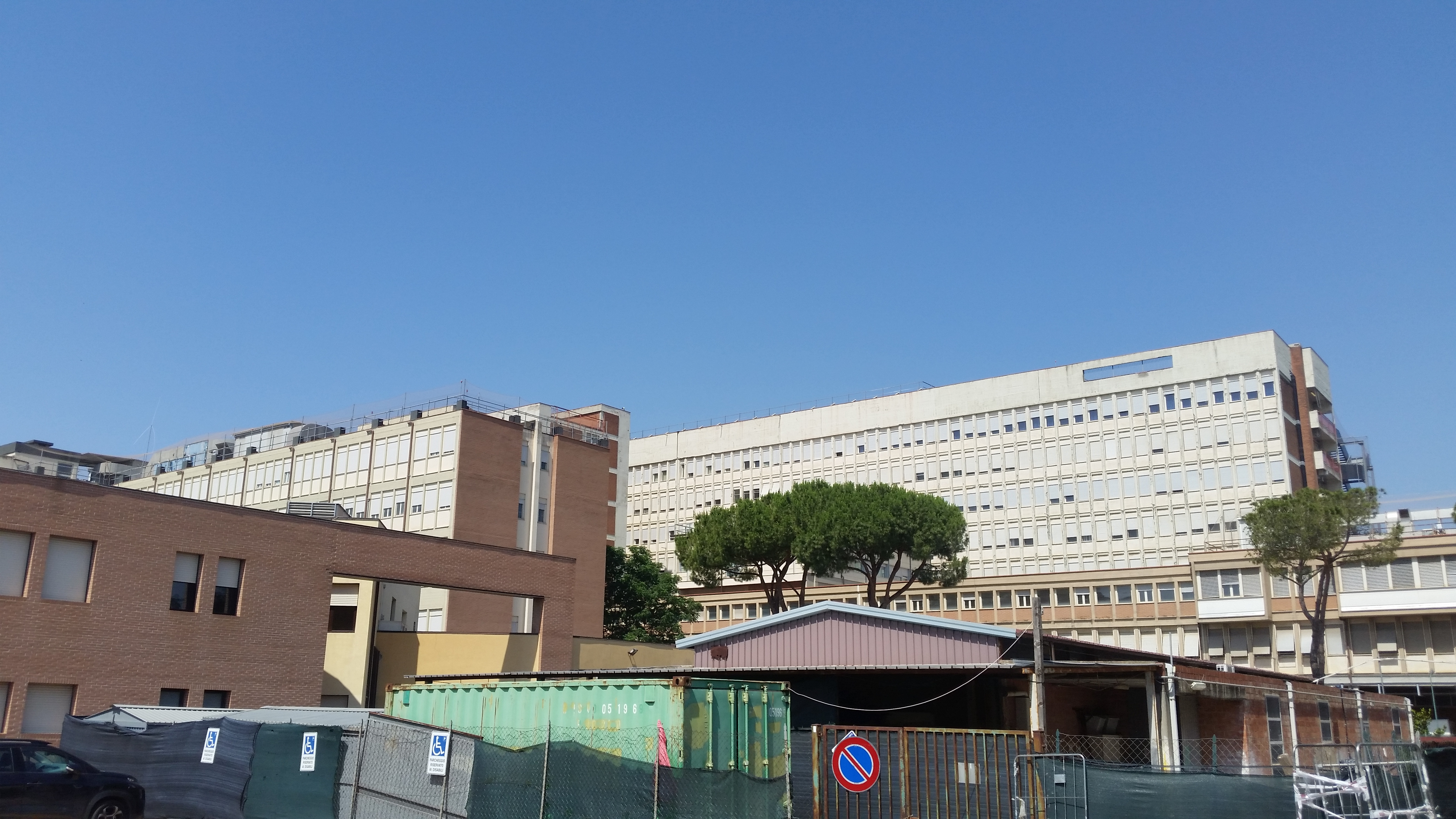
The Misericordia Hospital

- Church of Santa Famiglia (Holy Family): it is the first parish church of the neighborhood, located on Via Unione Sovietica. The parish was established by Bishop Adelmo Tacconi in 1979, and the church was consecrated on 9 April 1989. The following month, on 21 May, the church received a visit from Pope John Paul II, who celebrated Mass there.
- Church of Santa Teresa of Calcutta: it is the second parish church in the neighborhood, located on Via Stati Uniti. The parish was established in 2004 by Bishop Franco Agostinelli, dedicated to Mother Teresa. Designed by architect Stefania Ritti, the church was consecrated by Bishop Rodolfo Cetoloni on 2 December 2018.
- Villa Sugherella: it is the historic manor house of an estate documented since the 17th century.
- Monument to the Shoveler ("Badilante"): a 2008 sculpture by Antonio Lazari located on Via Monte Labbro near the Diversion Canal. It is 4.5 meters tall and depicts a shoveler ("badilante"), in tribute to all the workers who contributed to the land reclamation efforts in the Maremma.

== Education ==
The schools in the neighborhood are part of the Istituto Comprensivo Grosseto 3, which includes the primary school "Salvo D'Acquisto" on Via Jugoslavia and the middle school "Giuseppe Ungaretti" on Via Portogallo.

== Government ==
The State Services Centre, a multifunctional centre that houses the headquarters of the Police Department and the Fire Department of Grosseto, is located along the route of the Diversion Canal and consists of various buildings (offices, barracks, housing), among which the Police headquarters (Questura) stands out for its height and size, composed of five interconnected towers. The project was overseen by architect Carlo Quintelli, and construction began in 1992. The Fire Department's headquarters was completed in 1999, while the Questura was inaugurated on 19 May 2007, in the presence of Minister Giuliano Amato and Police Chief Giovanni De Gennaro.

On Via Senese, there is the Misericordia Hospital, the main healthcare facility in the province under the Local Health Authority Toscana Sud Est. Outside the hospital, there is a landing pad for the air rescue service. Along Via Senese, you can also find the former central artillery depot of the Ministry of Defence, now disused, as well as the barracks of the 3rd Regiment "Savoia Cavalleria", stationed in Grosseto since 1995.

== See also ==
- Barbanella
- Gorarella

== Sources ==
- Barsanti, Danilo; Bonelli Conenna, Lucia; Rombai, Leonardo (2001). Le carte del granduca. La Maremma dei Lorena attraverso la cartografia. Grosseto: Biblioteca Chelliana.
- Catalani, Barbara; Del Francia, Marco; Tombari, Giovanni (2011). Itinerari di architettura contemporanea. Grosseto e provincia. Pisa: ETS.
- Celuzza, Mariagrazia; Papa, Mauro (2013). Grosseto visibile. Guida alla città e alla sua arte pubblica. Arcidosso: Edizioni Effigi.
- Guerrini, Giuseppe (1996). La Diocesi di Grosseto. Parrocchie, chiese e altri luoghi di culto, dalle origini ai nostri giorni. Roccastrada: Il mio amico.
- Lucetti, Riccardo (2003). "Segni e mutamenti". In Consorzio di Bonifica Grossetana (ed.). Dietro il paesaggio. Segni e mutamenti. Roccastrada: Il mio amico.
- Santini, Mario (2010). "P.E.E.P. Nord - Grosseto". Architetture Grosseto (9). Pisa: ETS.
