= Omberto Aldobrandeschi =

Member of an Italian Nobel Family who appeared in Divine Comedy

Omberto Aldobrandeschi (? – 1259; sometimes anglicized as Omberto Aldobrandesco), was a member of the Aldobrandeschi family and a Count of Santa Fiora in the Maremma of Siena. Counts of Santa Fiora were usually in wars against the city of Siena. In 1259, Omberto was killed in one of these battles, at the village of Campagnatico. Omberto is mentioned in Canto XI of Purgatorio of Divine Comedy by Dante, as an example of a sinner of pride.
