= Arcille =

- Frazione
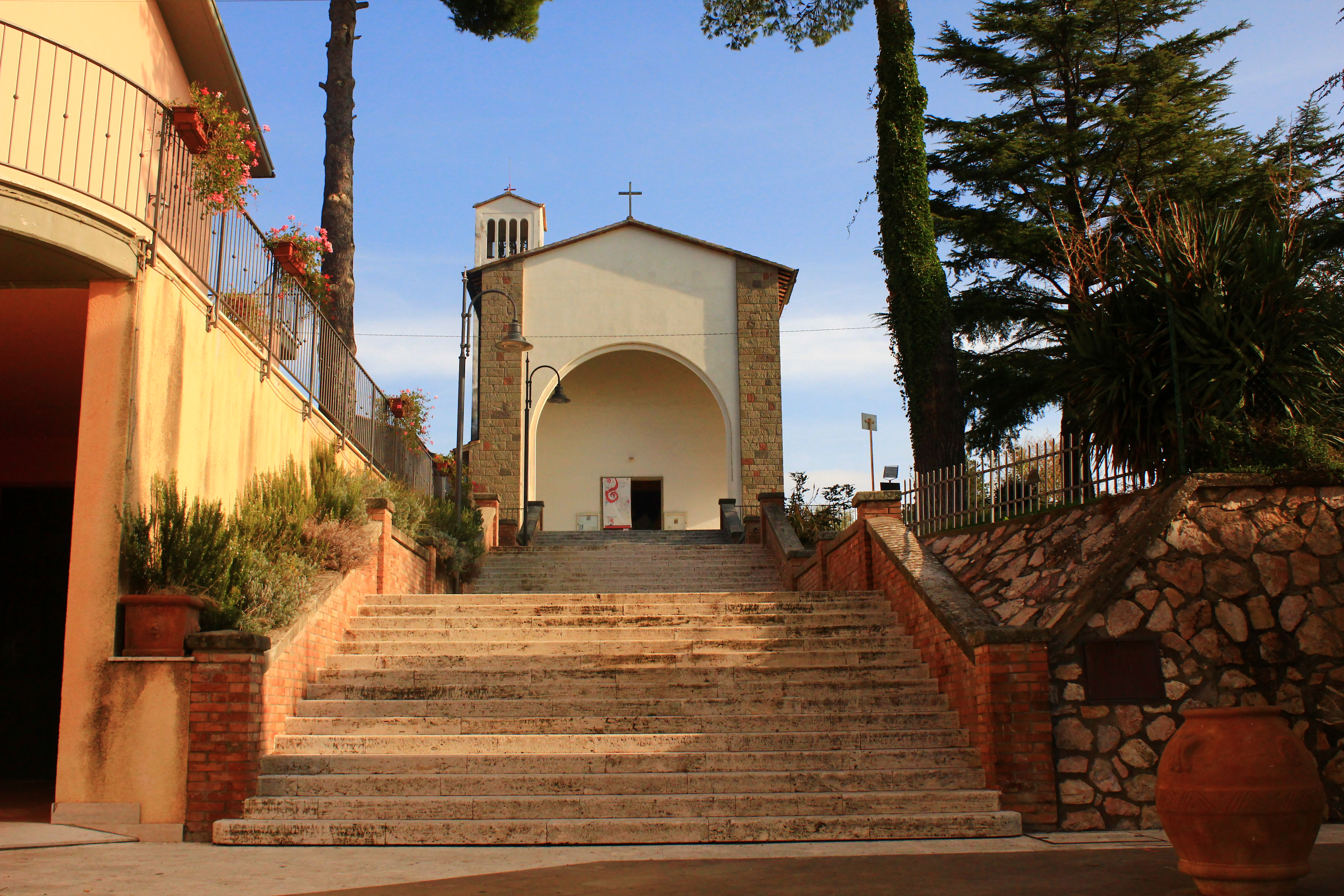
- The church of Our Lady of Lourdes

- Location of Arcille in Italy
- Coordinates: 42°48′01″N 11°15′6″E
- Country: Italy
- Region: Tuscany
- Province: Grosseto (GR)
- Comune: Campagnatico
- Elevation: 46 m (151 ft)

Population (2011)
  - Total: 241
- Demonym: Arcillesi
- Time zone: UTC+1 (CET)
  - Summer (DST): UTC+2 (CEST)
- Postal code: 58042
- Dialing code: (+39) 0564

Arcille is a village in Tuscany, central Italy, administratively a frazione of the municipality of Campagnatico, province of Grosseto. At the time of the 2001 census its population amounted to 100.

Arcille is about 14 km from Grosseto and 12 km from Campagnatico, and it is situated close to the Ombrone river.

== Geography ==
Arcille is located in the southern part of the municipality, on the Sant'Antonio plateau at the eastern edge of the Grosseto plain, in the Maremma region. The village lies on the right bank of the Ombrone river and is bordered to the south by the Trasubbie stream, which flows into the Ombrone nearby and marks the boundary with the municipality of Scansano.

Arcille borders Istia d'Ombrone and the municipality of Grosseto to the west, Marrucheti to the northwest, Campagnatico to the north, Polveraia and Baccinello to the east, and Preselle to the south.

== History ==
For centuries a sparsely populated rural area, the village developed only during the 20th century, following the complete reclamation of the Maremma plain and the land reform initiated in 1951.

The village was planned as a service and community centre for the scattered farms in the Trasubbie valley, near the confluence of the Trasubbie and Ombrone rivers, following land redistribution in the area. The design was entrusted in 1953 to engineers Enzo Berti and Andrea Bianchini from Arezzo, who "skillfully exploited the gentle natural slope to create a terraced layout on which the various buildings are arranged around the square, crossed at the centre by a wide staircase dramatically terminated at the top by the simple single-nave church". Originally intended to be named Sant'Antonio after the estate on which it was built, the settlement ultimately retained the name Arcille.

The first stone was laid on 29 December 1954, and the village was officially inaugurated on 23 March 1958 in the presence of the Minister of Agriculture, Emilio Colombo. In 1955, the parish of Our Lady of Lourdes was established by bishop Paolo Galeazzi.

== Main sights ==
=== Church of Our Lady of Lourdes ===
The church of Our Lady of Lourdes (Madonna di Lourdes) is the parish church of the village, situated in a dominant position overlooking the rest of Arcille. The church, together with the rectory, was designed by engineers Berti and Bianchini as part of the overall plan for the village. The parish was established by Bishop Paolo Galeazzi on 1 January 1955. The church was consecrated by Bishop Galeazzi on 23 March 1958, marking the centenary of the Marian apparitions to Bernadette Soubirous.

The building has a single nave with six bays and a series of three single-light windows on each side. The bell tower rises to the left of the apse. The interior houses a painting of the Supper at Emmaus by Arnaldo Mazzanti, completed in 2002.

=== Church of Saint Anne ===
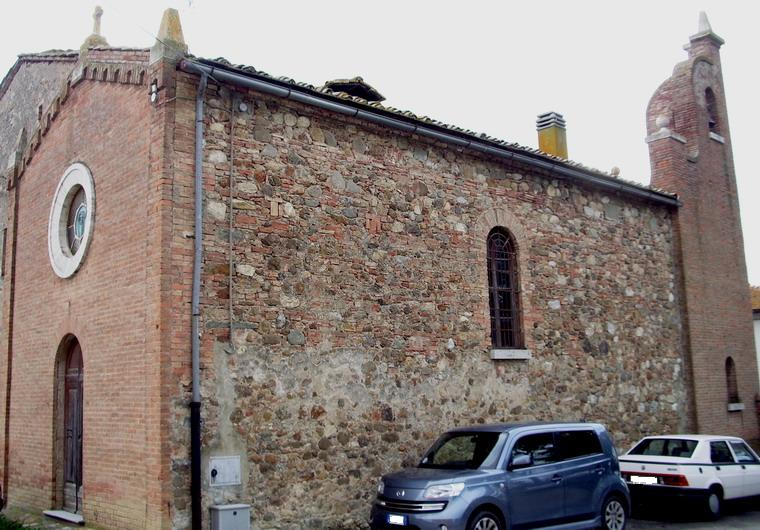
The chapel of Saint Philip the Apostle in Sticcianese

The church of Saint Anne (Sant'Anna) is located in the hamlet of Granaione, about 8 km northeast of Arcille in the surrounding countryside. It belongs to the parish of Our Lady of Lourdes. The church, a single-nave building with a gabled façade and a small bell-gable, was erected in 1958 by the Piccolomini family.

=== Sticcianese Farm ===
The Sticcianese Farm is the centre of a historic estate in the territory of Campagnatico, located less than two kilometres east of Arcille. The property includes the main villa, outbuildings, and the chapel of Saint Philip the Apostle, built in 1938 and deconsecreted in the 1990s. The chapel has a single nave with a gabled roof. The façade and bell tower are faced in brick, while the other walls are in stone. The main façade features a round-arched wooden portal with a circular rose window above, and the bell tower rises at the rear-right corner with an L-shaped plan and an angled belfry. The interior is rectangular, with a wooden gallery above the entrance and the altar against the rear wall, framed by pilasters and a semicircular pediment.

== Education ==
Public educational services in Arcille are provided by the "Federigo Tozzi" Institute of Paganico. It operates two public schools in the village: the "Ferdinando Paolieri" middle school and an elementary school, both located on Piazza della Repubblica.

== Sources ==
- Crispolti, Enrico; Mazzanti, Anna; Quattrocchi, Luca, eds. (2005). Arte in Maremma nella prima metà del Novecento. Milan: Silvana Editoriale.
- Fusi, Flavio (1985). Terra non guerra: contadini e riforme nella Maremma grossetana (1945-1955). Grosseto: Editori del Grifo.
- Simoncelli, Antonio Valentino (1989). La Riforma fondiaria in Maremma (1950-1965). Grosseto.

== See also ==
- Marrucheti
- Montorsaio
