= Francesco Somaini =

Italian sculptor (1926–2005)

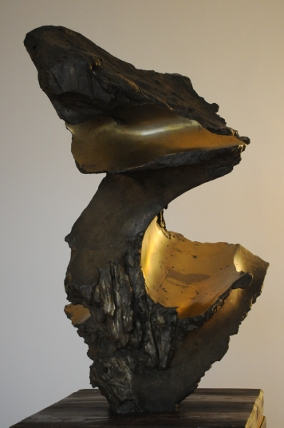
Francesco Somaini, "Verticale III. Assalonne", 1959, bronzo con lucidi su base lignea

Francesco Somaini (6 August 1926 – 19 November 2005) was an Italian sculptor.

== Biography ==
Somaini was born on 6 August 1926 in Lomazzo.

His early works were influenced by post-war abstract sculpture movements, particularly in Italy.

=== 1957–1966 – The Informal period ===
Monumento ai Marinai d'Italia, 1965–67, Corso XXII Marzo, Milan

He imposed himself upon critics' attention in 1956, thanks to his participation in the XXVIII Biennale of Venice. He reached success at a worldwide level in 1959 with the exhibition hall at the V Biennale of San Paolo of Brazil, where he gained the first international prize for sculpture: this international recognition allowed him to access the United States art market. In the 1960 he was invited to set up his own exhibition hall at the XXX Venice Biennale. In the following year, he participated in the Deuxième Biennale of Paris, where he was awarded the first prize of the French Art Criticism. During this period, his sculptures met the favor of critics like Giulio Carlo Argan and Michel Tapié. Being interested in experimenting with different materials, he cast his works also in iron, lead and pewter, attacking them with the blowtorch, and finally polishing their concave parts in order to accentuate their expressive drive. This was the time of Martirii and Feriti, presented in the various personal exhibitions set up at the National Gallery of Turin, at the Italian Cultural Institute of New York, at the Blu Gallery of Rome and in all the most important international collective exhibitions of sculpture.

=== 1967–1975 – Monumental works: reflections upon the relationship between sculpture, architecture and modern cities ===
After the informal period, Somaini started to give to his sculptures symbolic meanings (Portals, 1967): Organic forms were put in a continuous dialectic relationship with architectural geometric volumes; this visionary research culminated in the cycle of Carnificazioni di un’architettura (1974–1976). Starting from the conviction that sculpture shall have a role in the requalification of the urban architectural context – opinion matured between 1958 and 1972, during informal experiences made on a big scale in Italy and in the United States – the sculptor formalized his own ideas, both at a theoretical and utopist level, in a series of project studies (Enrico Crispolti, Francesco Somaini, Urgency in the city, Mazzotta, Milan, 1972). Parallel to these studies on the relationship between sculpture, architecture and the environment, Somaini experimented a personal technique of direct carving executed by using a high pressure jet of sand. This approach became a fundamental component of his plastic language from 1965 onward.

=== 1975–1986 – Matrixes and traces ===
In 1975 the conceptual analysis of the laboratorial procedures related to sculpture brought the artist to the creation of a bas-relief "Trace", obtained by rolling a carved "Matrix" that, leaving a mark in evolution, developed and revealed on the "Trace" a cryptic image in negative. Matrixes and traces introduced the dynamic element, the action, the idea of a path, of an intervention that involved architecture and urban context. These new works of art were presented in his personal exhibition hall at the Venice Biennale of 1978 (Prima traccia e la scultura matrice: Antropoammonite), in the anthological exhibition at the Wilhelm – Lembruck Museum of Duisburg in 1979 (Sviluppo di un paesaggio antropomorfico e matrice, 1978–79) and in the personal exhibition at the Botanical Garden of Lucca in 1980 (Svolgimento dell’avvolto: traccia tragica, 1979).

=== 1987–2005 – The last season: great marbles ===
From the mid-1980s onward, Somaini came back again to the execution of large scale works in Italy and Japan, where the dialectics of the mark brought the sculptor to deal with positive/negative shapes, as in Europe’s Gate, Como, 1995. This activity went on in successive works of great commitment like Fortunia (1988), in a series of Lotte con il serpente characterized by an organic nature overbearingly lively, as in Fortunia Vincitrice (2000). Some of the above-mentioned works were presented in the anthological exhibition set up in the Brera Palace of Milan in 1997, in the Quadrennial of Rome of 1999, in the Carrara Biennales of 1998 and 2000 and in the anthological exhibition at the Pergine Castle (Trento) in 2000.

In recent years the sculptor carried forward, side by side to his plastic activity, his drawing and painting activity in a more intensive way. In 1999, he realized a large series of works on paper that recalled in a fantastic way the myths and legends related to the Vulcan Etna, revisited also through the reading of Maria Corti's book (Catasto magico, Einaudi, 1999). In the following years he put in the offices of the Bennet shopping mall of Montano Lucino (Como) Fortunia Vincitrice (1997–2000) and Variazioni su grande scultura verticale (2001).

Somaini took part in some important exhibitions, as Arts and Architecture, 1900–2000 trusted by Germano Celant at Palazzo Ducale of Genoa (2004), Italian Sculpture of the XX century at the Arnaldo Pomodoro Foundation and Annicinquanta. The offspring of Italian creativity, Royal Palace of Milan (2005).

He died in Como on 19 November 2005. The National Gallery of Modern and Contemporary Art of Rome dedicated him the first posthumous retrospective exhibition, The informal period 1957–1964 (2007).

== Artistic production ==
Somaini's activity was not only confined to the field of sculpture: it is characterized by a large production of drawings and paintings, often for the purpose of studying sculptural works. The artist also experimented new expressive means such as photography (with the realization of photomontages mostly related to his reflection upon modern metropolises, 1974–1980) and live performance (action of Bremen, 1986). Worth of mention also the sculptor's activity since the 1950s in the architectural field in collaboration, among others, with Luigi Caccia Dominioni, Ico Parisi and Ignazio Gardella.

Some of the most important works of Somaini are located in major museums of the United States, Germany, the Netherlands, Austria, Italy, Vatican City, Belgium, Finland, Brazil and Serbia. Others are located in public spaces in the United States, Italy, United Kingdom, Japan, New Zealand, the Netherlands and Switzerland.

== Bibliography ==
- L. Degand, M. Radice, Francesco Somaini, Nani, Como, 1956
- U. Apollonio, M. Tapié, Francesco Somaini, Editions du Griffon, Neuchâtel, 1960
- R. Barilli, 20 Disegni di Francesco Somaini, Edizioni del Milione, Milan, 1964
- E. Crispolti, Francesco Somaini: Urban Urgencies, Edizioni Mazzotta, Milan, 1973 (trad. di H. Martin)
- E. Crispolti, Francesco Somaini, "Terzoocchio", n. 5, Edizioni Bora, Bologna, 1979
- F. Gualdoni, Francesco Somaini. Erosione accellerata, Ingersoll-Rand, Milan, 1985
- R. Barilli, Francesco Somaini: Maestri Contemporanei, Vanessa Edizioni d’Arte, Milan, 1987
- E. Ratti, R. Bossaglia, L. Caramel, A. Longatti, Francesco Somaini: La porta d’Europa. Un’opera per tutti noi, Como 1994
- E. Crispolti, L. Somaini, Somaini: Le grandi opere. Realizzazioni, Progetti, Utopie, Electa, Milan, 1997
