= Montorsaio =

- Frazione
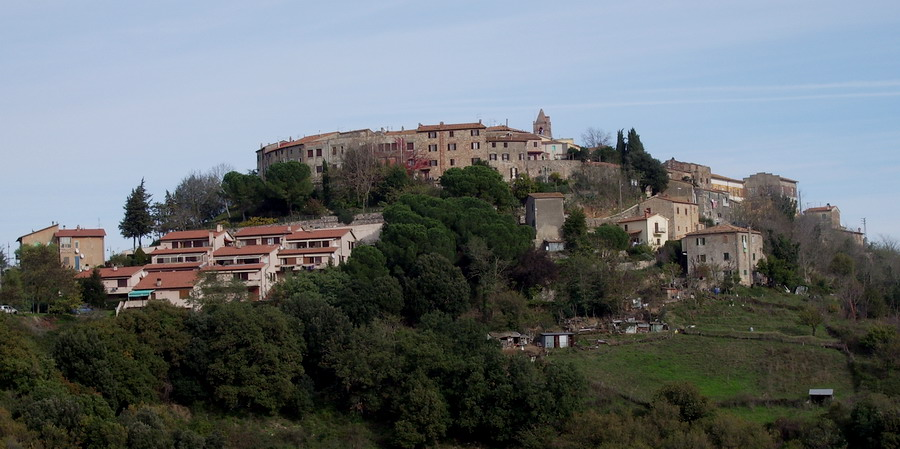
- View of Montorsaio

- Location of Montorsaio in Italy
- Coordinates: 42°53′26″N 11°12′13″E
- Country: Italy
- Region: Tuscany
- Province: Grosseto (GR)
- Comune: Campagnatico
- Elevation: 384 m (1,260 ft)

Population (2011)
  - Total: 178
- Demonym: Mantorsaioli
- Time zone: UTC+1 (CET)
  - Summer (DST): UTC+2 (CEST)
- Postal code: 58042
- Dialing code: (+39) 0564

Montorsaio is a village in Tuscany, central Italy, administratively a frazione of the comune of Campagnatico, province of Grosseto. At the time of the 2001 census its population amounted to 167.

Montorsaio is about 20 km from Grosseto and 11 km from Campagnatico, and it is situated on a hill above the Ombrone river.

== Main sights ==
- Church of Santi Cerbone e Michele (12th century), main parish church of the village
- Church of Santissimo Crocifisso, ancient church re-built in the 20th century
- Convent of San Benedetto alla Nave (14th century), now transformed into a farmhouse
- Walls of Montorsaio, old fortifications which surround the village since the 12th century
- Cassero Senese, a 13th-century fortress

== Bibliography ==
- Aldo Mazzolai, Guida della Maremma. Percorsi tra arte e natura, Le Lettere, Florence, 1997
- Giuseppe Guerrini, Torri e castelli della Provincia di Grosseto, Nuova Immagine Editrice, Siena, 1999

== See also ==
- Arcille
- Campagnatico
- Marrucheti
