= Santa Famiglia, Grosseto =

Santa Famiglia
- Church of the Holy Family
- Chiesa della Santa Famiglia (Italian)
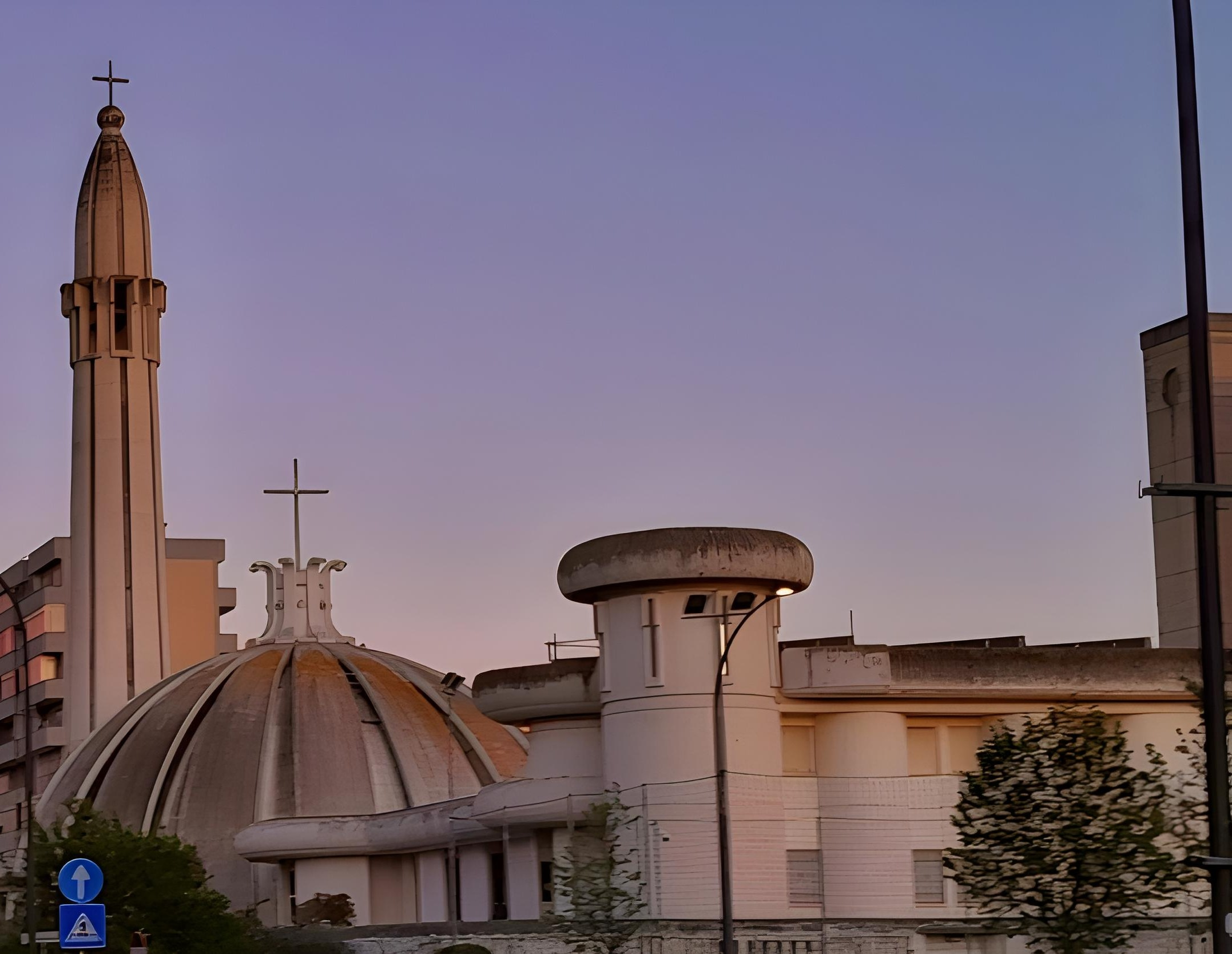
- Santa Famiglia
- 42°46′35.1″N 11°07′11.1″E
- Location: Grosseto, Tuscany
- Address: Via Unione Sovietica
- Country: Italy
- Denomination: Roman Catholic

History
- Status: Parish church
- Consecrated: 9 April 1989; 37 years ago

Architecture
- Architect: Enzo Pisaneschi
- Architectural type: Church
- Style: Brutalism
- Groundbreaking: 1983
- Completed: 1989

Administration
- Diocese: Diocese of Grosseto

Santa Famiglia (Holy Family) is a Roman Catholic church in Grosseto, Tuscany. The church, along with the entire parish complex, is located on Via Unione Sovietica in the northeastern neighborhood of Sugherella, within the "167 Nord" public housing development. The church has also attracted interest due to its unusual appearance, which evokes the look of a mosque with a minaret.

The parish serves a community of approximately 11,000 people.

== History ==
The parish was established by Bishop Adelmo Tacconi on 1 November 1979, with the dedication to the Holy Family, a choice made during the first ecclesial assembly held from September 10 to 12. This establishment was one of Bishop Tacconi's initial initiatives after arriving in Grosseto on 3 June of the same year. It was necessary to serve the new "167 Nord" housing complex in the Sugherella neighborhood, still under construction and anticipated to become one of the most populated areas of the city.

Construction of the church, designed by engineer Enzo Pisaneschi in 1982, was undertaken by the Piccionetti company and began on 10 March 1983. The church was integrated into the affordable housing plan, situated in a central plot between the long building of the social-commercial center and the high residential buildings.

The church of the Holy Family was the last building in the housing development to be completed, with its consecration occurring on 9 April 1989, marking the anniversary of the episcopal transfer from Rusellae by Pope Innocent II. The following month, on 21 May, the church was visited by Pope John Paul II, more than 800 years after Pope Innocent II's last visit. The new church was chosen for the official meeting with diocesan priests and nuns and for a mass celebrated by the Pope himself. This event is commemorated by a plaque inside the church.

== Description ==
The architectural complex is a unified structure made of exposed reinforced concrete, featuring white color and sinuous, rounded forms that contrast with the grey, angular buildings of the surrounding neighborhood. Covering an area of 1,100 square meters, the complex consists of a raised platform connected to the street level by ramps and stairs, and is organized into four core sections.

The church, with its circular floor plan, is topped by a large hemispherical dome with sixteen grooves that meet at the top in a ring beam, creating a dynamic interplay of solid and empty spaces. The interior is illuminated by thirty-two crescent-shaped windows arranged in radial patterns that converge at the dome's apex. The main hall has a terrazzo floor with "Venetian-style" decorations, featuring concentric circles of black and white aggregates, while the raised presbytery area is finished with black marble. Sculptures by artist Father Andrea Martini, including the ambon, a monumental statue of the Holy Family, a baptismal font, and a tabernacle depicting an angel in adoration, add to the church's artistic elements.

Flanking the dome are additional lateral structures, and integrated into the entrance portico is a 49-meter high bell tower. This hollow, truncated-conical tower is marked by vertical grooves that cast contrasting shadows against its white surface. Access to the bell chamber is provided by an overhanging spiral staircase made of reinforced concrete.

== Critical reception ==
The church's architectural lines, reminiscent of a mosque with its minaret, make it one of the most unique and distinctive buildings in the city.

The complex has received praise for its effective use of reinforced concrete, evident in the sixteen radial frames of the dome, the bell tower, and the interiors. According to Paolini (2013), the building "impresses with how it relates to the surrounding urban environment", while Catalani, Del Francia, and Tombari (2011) commend its "gentle curves" and the cohesive architectural unity of the entire complex, achieved through a "consistent and homogeneous design of geometry and volume".

== Sources ==
- "Complesso parrocchiale Santa Famiglia a Grosseto". L'Industria Italiana del Cemento (652). February 1991.
- Diocese of Grosseto (1995). Annuario Diocesano 1995. Roccastrada: Il mio amico.
- Catalani, Barbara; Del Francia, Marco; Tombari, Giovanni (2011). Itinerari di architettura contemporanea. Grosseto e provincia. Pisa: ETS.
- Celuzza, Mariagrazia; Papa, Mauro (2013). Grosseto visibile. Guida alla città e alla sua arte pubblica. Arcidosso: Edizioni Effigi.
- Guerrini, Giuseppe (1996). La Diocesi di Grosseto. Parrocchie, chiese e altri luoghi di culto, dalle origini ai nostri giorni. Roccastrada: Il mio amico.
- Parisi, Marcella (2001). Grosseto dentro e fuori porta. L'emozione e il pensiero. Siena: C&P Adver Effigi.
