= Vincenzo Ricasoli =

Italian politician (1814–1891)

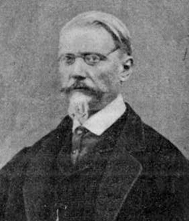
Vincenzo Ricasoli

Vincenzo Ricasoli (13 February 1814 – 20 June 1891) was an Italian politician, agronomist and patriot.

Brother of Bettino, he fought in the Risorgimento wars until he achieved the rank of major general in the Piedmontese-Sardinian army. He managed the estate of Gorarella in Grosseto, Tuscany and established a botanical garden in Porto Ercole. Ricasoli served as a deputy and a senator of the Kingdom of Italy for several years.
