= Campagnatico =

- Comune
- Comune di Campagnatico
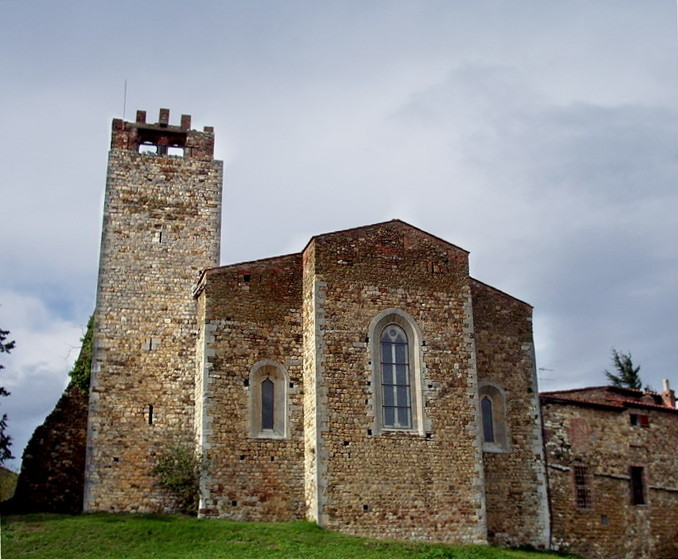
- Apse of the pieve of San Giovanni Battista.

- Location within Italy Location within Tuscany
- Coordinates: 42°53′N 11°16′E
- Country: Italy
- Region: Tuscany
- Province: Grosseto (GR)
- Frazioni: Arcille, Marrucheti, Montorsaio

Government
  - Mayor: Elismo Pesucci (centre-right)

Area
  - Total: 162.25 km^{2} (62.65 sq mi)
- Elevation: 275 m (902 ft)

Population (30 April 2017)
  - Total: 2,436
  - Density: 15.01/km^{2} (38.89/sq mi)
- Time zone: UTC+1 (CET)
  - Summer (DST): UTC+2 (CEST)
- Postal code: 58042
- Dialing code: 0564
- Patron saint: St. John the Baptist
- Saint day: June 24
- Website: Official website

Campagnatico is a comune (municipality) in the Province of Grosseto in the Italian region Tuscany, located about 100 kilometres (62 mi) south of Florence and about 20 kilometres (12 mi) northeast of Grosseto in the valley of the Ombrone River.

== History ==
The town was founded as a fief of the San Salvatore Abbey of the Monte Amiata, which sold it to the Aldobrandeschi family, who are known to hold it in 973. After the death of Omberto Aldobrandeschi, it was acquired by the Republic of Siena. Later it was contended by the Visconti of Campiglia d'Orcia and the Tolomei of Siena. It belonged to the latter city until it was absorbed into the Grand Duchy of Tuscany in the mid-16th century.

== Government ==
=== Frazioni ===
The municipality is formed by the municipal seat of Campagnatico and the villages (frazioni) of Arcille, Marrucheti and Montorsaio.

=== List of mayors ===
Mayor	Term start	Term end	Party
Elismo Pesucci	1998	2007	Forza Italia
Fabrizio Tistarelli	2007	2012	Independent (centre-right)
Luca Ricciardi	2012	2017	Independent (centre-left)
Luca Grisanti	2017	Incumbent	Independent (centre-right)

== Main sights ==
- The Walls, built in the 12th and 13th centuries. They include the commanding Aldobrandeschi castle, founded in the 10th century.
- Church of Santa Maria della Misericordia, known from 1188. It has a hut-shaped façade in which an oculus was added in the 19th century. The interior, on the Latin cross plan, has kept the medieval transept and presbytery, with remains of the 14th-century Sienese school in the main chapel and others from the 15th century in the side chapels, recently discovered and hypothetically attributed to Francesco di Giorgio Martini.
- Pieve of San Giovanni Battista, built in the mid-13th century in Romanesque-Gothic style. The façade has a portal with decorated lunette and a small rose window. The interior has a nave with side chapels inscribed by ogival arches. It re-used as bell tower one of the town's walls. It houses a 13th-century Madonna with Child by Guido di Graziano and a wooden ciborium from the 16th century.
- Former church of Sant'Antonio Abate, in Romanesque style. It houses fragments of 14th-century frescoes.
- Pieve Vecchia, south of Campagnatico near the Ombrone River.
