= Collegio Ghislieri (Rome) =

College grounded by Giuseppe Ghislieri

Coordinates: 41°53′47.6″N 12°28′04.0″E

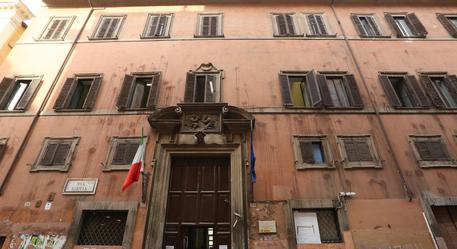
- The facade of the Ghislieri College incorporated in the Liceo Virgilio
- Interactive map of the Collegio Ghislieri area

General information
- Location: Rome, Italy

The Collegio Ghislieri was a building in Rome, seat of the eponymous charitable institution, important for architectural and historical reasons.

The College was founded in 1656 by Giuseppe Ghislieri and was meant to host 24 boys of the decayed pontifical nobility for free during high school. Placed under the protection of the duke Salviati, the college was closed in 1928.

The building which hosted the college, possibly work of Carlo Maderno, was demolished in the 1930s. Its façade on Via Giulia and some decorations have survived, incorporated in the structure of the Liceo classico Virgilio, built on the same site between 1936 and 1939 after a design by Marcello Piacentini.

== Location ==
The building was located in Rome, in the Regola Rione, about halfway down via Giulia (at the n. 38), in an area devastated by the demolitions started in 1938 for the construction of a road between Ponte Mazzini and Corso Vittorio Emanuele, never built because of the war. To the south it bordered with vicolo dello struzzo.

== History ==
In 1656 Giuseppe Ghislieri (1570–1656), a renowned physician and member of the family to which Pope Pius V (r. 1566–1572) had belonged, on his deathbed destined all his goods to the foundation of this institution. In 1670, after being housed in various locations (at the Botteghe Oscure in front of Santo Stanislao dei Polacchi, in Via della Stamperia by Palazzo Pamphilj and at Via della Lupa), the Collegio moved to its final seat at via Giulia, in a 16th-century palace possibly designed by Carlo Maderno. The institution was administered by four guardiani of the Archconfraternity of the Sancta Sanctorum by the holy stairs, and was placed under the protection of the noble Florentine family of the Salviati.

When the Salviati family died out in 1794, protectors became several cardinals, including Francesco Carafa della Spina di Traetto and Joseph Fesch, uncle of Napoleon and resident not far away, at Palazzo Falconieri in Via Giulia. In 1839 the third-born son of the prince Borghese took the name of the Salviati, thus regaining the protectorate of the college. The institution was closed in 1928 because of financial difficulties. Through the proceeds of the liquidation, however, annual scholarships were instituted which allowed to continue the college mission.

Between 1936 and 1939 the building was almost completely demolished to make way for the Liceo classico Virgilio, a controversial work by Marcello Piacentini.

== Organization ==
The boarding school housed for five years 24 young people (later increased to 38) from fallen noble families of the Papal State. Later, the school was opened to young boys of each class. At the time of admission the students had to be not older than 18 years and were lodged for a maximum of five years. Of these, six were hosted free of charge: five of them were designated one each by as many noble families, and the sixth by the Roman people. The students attended the subjects of their choice at the Collegio Romano without any obligation to join the ecclesiastical career, even though they had to wear a long black dress under their knees and a black cassock, and they had to attend daily mass and often take the sacraments. The boys were housed in three dormitories, intended for the younger, the older and the middle ones. The wake up call took place at 5:30 a.m., and after having washed with cold water and followed the lessons at the Collegio Romano, they continued their study in the premises of Via Giulia. After the recreation they had to study until the evening for three hours and a quarter. The discipline was very hard, and for every little lack the students were forced to suffer penances and punishments, such the so called piatto rovesciato (English: overturned dish), that is being at lunch with the overturned dish in silence, therefore fasting.

== Architecture and Decoration ==
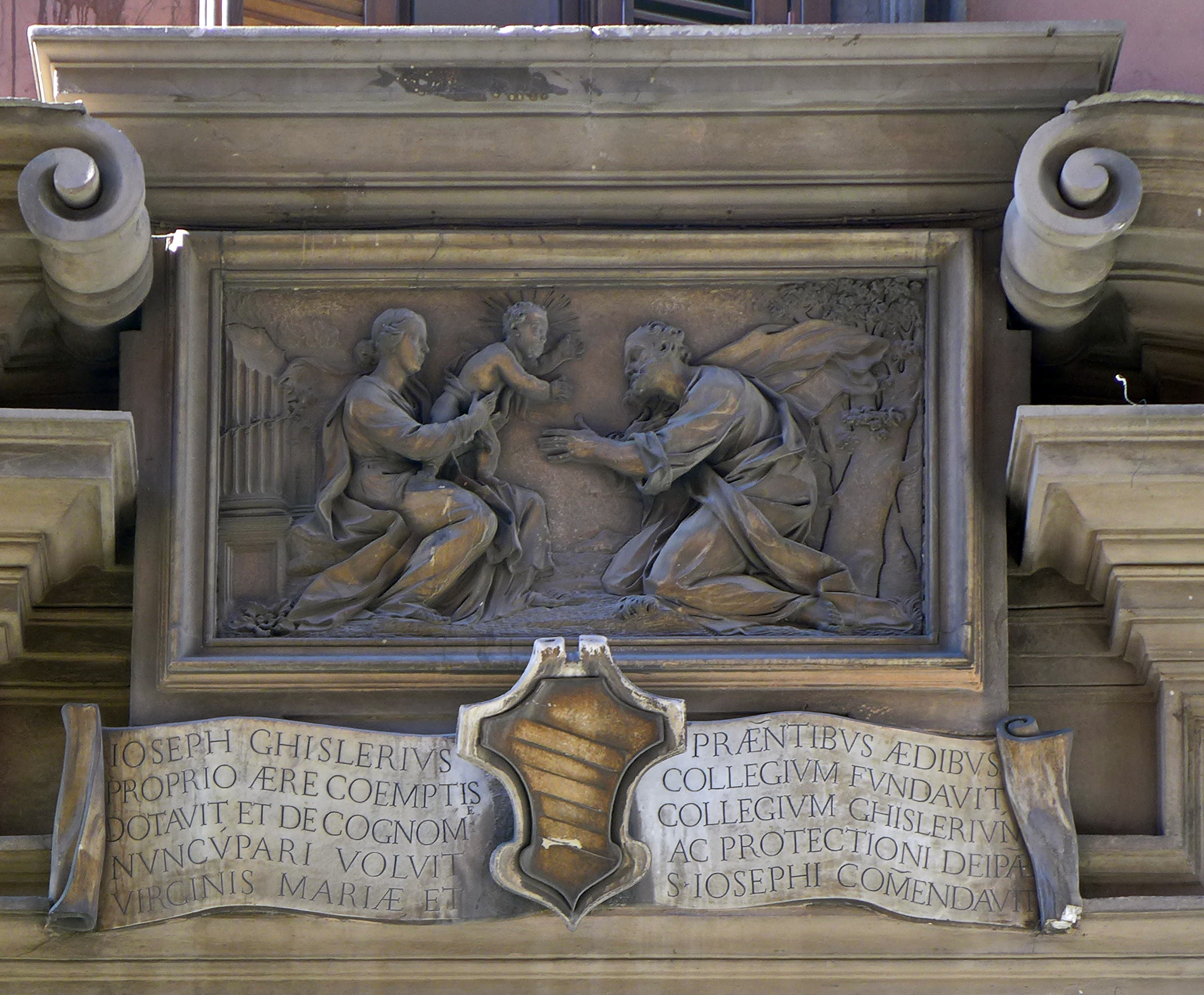
The relief portraying the Holy Family placed above the entrance portal

The building, according to some sources, was a 16th-century work by Carlo Maderno. It was structured on two floors with a mezzanine on the ground floor, and had a front of ten windows with a portal asymmetrical with respect to the façade. The edifice was almost completely demolished at the end of the 1930s for the construction of the Liceo classico Virgilio. What remained of the old building, including the facade along Via Giulia, was incorporated into the high school building: in particular, at the number 38 of Via Giulia has been remained in place the ancient and imposing portal, surmounted by a curvilinear broken tympanum adorned by a relief representing the Holy Family. Below this, it is placed the coat of arms of the House of Ghislieri, surrounded by the following inscription in a cartouche:

IOSEPH GHISLERIVS PRAE(SE)S AEDIBVS/ PROPRIO AERE COEMPTIS COLLEGIVM FUNDAVIT/ DOTAVIT ET DE COGNOM(INE) COLLEGIVM GHISLERIVM/ NUNCVPARI VOLVIT AC PROTECTIONI DEIPA(RAE) / VIRGINIS MARIAE ET S. JOSEPHI COM(M)ENDAVIT

Giuseppe Ghislieri bought this dwelling at his own expense, founded the college, wanted it to be called Ghislieri from his surname and recommended it to the protection of the Blessed Virgin Mary and St. Joseph

== Notable alumni ==
- Mario Mattei (1792–1870), Italian Cardinal
- Guido Baccelli (1830–1916), Italian physician, professor and statesman

== Sources ==
- Baronio, Cesare (1697). Descrizione di Roma moderna (in Italian). M.A. and P.A. De Rossi, Roma.
- Salerno, Luigi; Spezzaferro, Luigi; Tafuri, Manfredo (1973). Via Giulia: una utopia urbanistica del 500 (in Italian). Roma: Staderini.
- Carlo Pietrangeli (1979). Guide rionali di Roma (in Italian). Vol. Regola (III) (2 ed.). Roma: Fratelli Palombi Editori.
- Luca Borghi (2015). Il medico di Roma: Vita morte e miracoli di Guido Baccelli (1830–1916) (in Italian). Roma: Armando Editore. ISBN 9788866779858.
