= Primo Gasbarri =

Italian bishop (1911–1989)

- Bishop of Grosseto
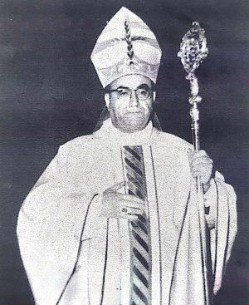
- Church: Catholic Church
- Diocese: Diocese of Grosseto
- In office: 16 October 1971 – 22 January 1979
- Predecessor: Paolo Galeazzi
- Successor: Adelmo Tacconi
- Previous posts: Apostolic Administrator of Sovana and Pitigliano (1970-1975); Apostolic Administrator of Grosseto (1965-1971); Titular Bishop of Thennesus (1953-1971); Auxiliary Bishop of Velletri (1953-1965)

Orders
- Ordination: 29 October 1933
- Consecration: 20 September 1953 by Clemente Micara

Personal details
- Born: 30 August 1911 Viterbo, Province of Rome, Kingdom of Italy
- Died: 6 November 1989 (aged 78) Rome, Italy

Primo Gasbarri (30 August 1911 – 6 November 1989) was an Italian Roman Catholic prelate. He was bishop of Grosseto from 1971 to 1979.

== Biography ==
Primo Gasbarri was born in Viterbo on 30 August 1911. He was ordained a priest for the diocese of Viterbo and Tuscania on 29 October 1933.

On 30 July 1953, he was appointed auxiliary bishop of Velletri and on 20 September 1953, he was consecrated titular bishop of Thennesus by Cardinal Clemente Micara.

In 1965, due to the infirmity of Bishop Paolo Galeazzi, he became the apostolic administrator of the diocese of Grosseto. From 1970, he also took on the role of administrator of the diocese of Sovana-Pitigliano. Among his pastoral commitments, on 18 September 1969, he blessed the first stone of the church of Maria Santissima Addolorata in Gorarella and participated in its consecration, which took place on 20 June 1971, together with Archbishop Giovanni Benelli. Additionally, on 28 January 1971, he consecrated the new church of Santa Margherita in Poggi del Sasso.

On 16 October 1971, he officially became the bishop of Grosseto. During his episcopate, on 9 June 1974, he consecrated the church of Maria Santissima in Sticciano Scalo and on 11 February 1975, he established the parish of Madonna delle Grazie in Scarlino Scalo. Gasbarri also oversaw the installation of a memorial plaque in the Grosseto Cathedral, commemorating the cathedral's consecration on 4 April 1655.

He resigned from his position on 22 January 1979, becoming the bishop emeritus of the diocese of Grosseto. He died on 6 November 1989, in Rome and, after the funeral, was buried in the cemetery of San Lazzaro in Viterbo.

In his honor, the library of the episcopal seminary of Grosseto has been dedicated to him.

== Sources ==
- Giotto Minucci (1988). La città di Grosseto e i suoi vescovi (498-1988). Vol. 2. Florence: Lucio Pugliese. pp. 433–434.
