= Ghislieri =

The Ghislieri, or less commonly Ghisleri, were an ancient Bolognese aristocratic family :

Ghislieri

- Michele Ghislieri (1504–1572), also known as Pope Pius V.
- Ghislieri College
- Ghislieri Choir and Consort, Giulio Prandi

Ghisleri

- Arcangelo Ghisleri (1855–1938), an Italian journalist.
