= Ernesto Ganelli =

Italian civil engineer

- Born: 24 February 1901; Alessandria, Kingdom of Italy
- Died: 9 September 1985 (aged 84); Grosseto, Italy
- Education: Sapienza University of Rome
- Occupation: Civil engineer

Ernesto Ganelli (24 February 1901 – 9 September 1985) was an Italian civil engineer mainly active in Tuscany. He played a key role in the urban development of Grosseto between the 1920s and 1950s, designing numerous religious, civic, and social buildings. His works include most of the new churches in the dioceses of Grosseto and Pitigliano-Sovana-Orbetello, such as the basilica of the Sacred Heart of Jesus, as well as schools, orphanages, clinics, public housing, and urban redevelopment projects.

== Life and career ==
Born in Alessandria in 1901, Ganelli moved early with his family to Rome, where he studied civil engineering. After graduating in 1924, he settled in Grosseto, Tuscany, where he became a key figure in the city's urban development between the 1920s and 1950s. His early work in Maremma included urban redevelopment projects in Follonica, where he served as municipal technical director, and the construction of the "Luigi Pierazzi" seaside colony. In 1931, he designed the Francini clinic in Grosseto, notable for its eclectic neo-Renaissance style.

He developed a strong collaboration with the Diocese of Grosseto, designing almost all new churches in the area from the 1930s to the 1950s. Major works include the churches of San Giuseppe, Medaglia Miracolosa, San Giuseppe Benedetto Cottolengo, and the monumental Basilica of the Sacred Heart of Jesus, built to commemorate the victims of the 1943 bombings. He also designed parish buildings and churches in rural communities such as Braccagni, Ribolla, Marina di Grosseto, Bagno di Gavorrano, Fonteblanda, Albinia, San Donato, Bagnore, Poggi del Sasso, and Semproniano.

In addition to religious architecture, Ganelli contributed to civic and social projects, including schools, orphanages, healthcare facilities like the OMNI building, sanatoriums in Grosseto, Massa Marittima, and Orbetello, as well as public housing in Castel del Piano and Bagno di Gavorrano.

In the 1953 general election, he was a candidate for the Senate of the Republic for the Christian Democracy party in the Grosseto constituency, receiving 31,205 votes but not being elected.

Ganelli died in Grosseto in 1985 and was buried in the cemetery of Misericordia.

== Works (selection) ==
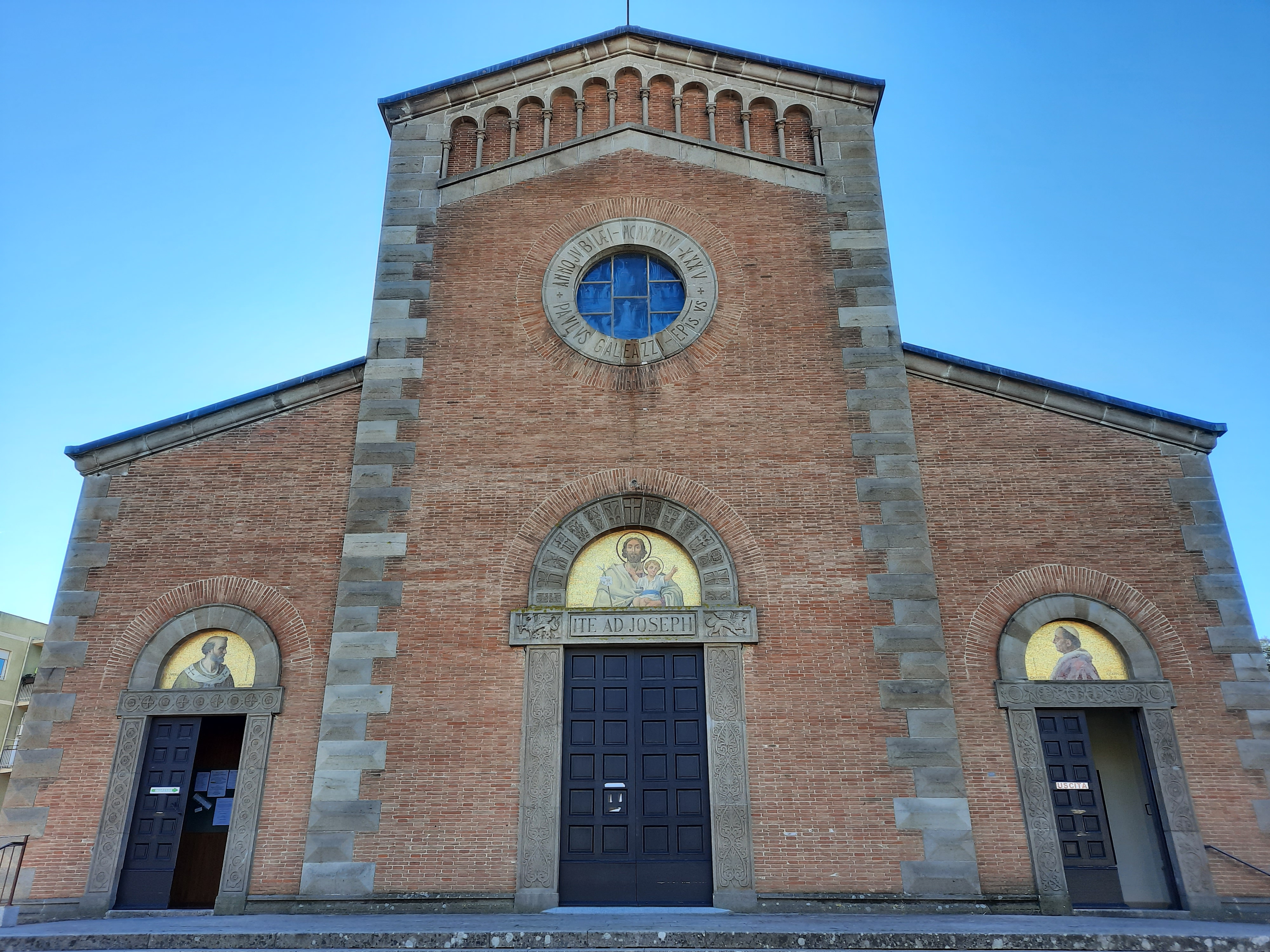
San Giuseppe, Grosseto

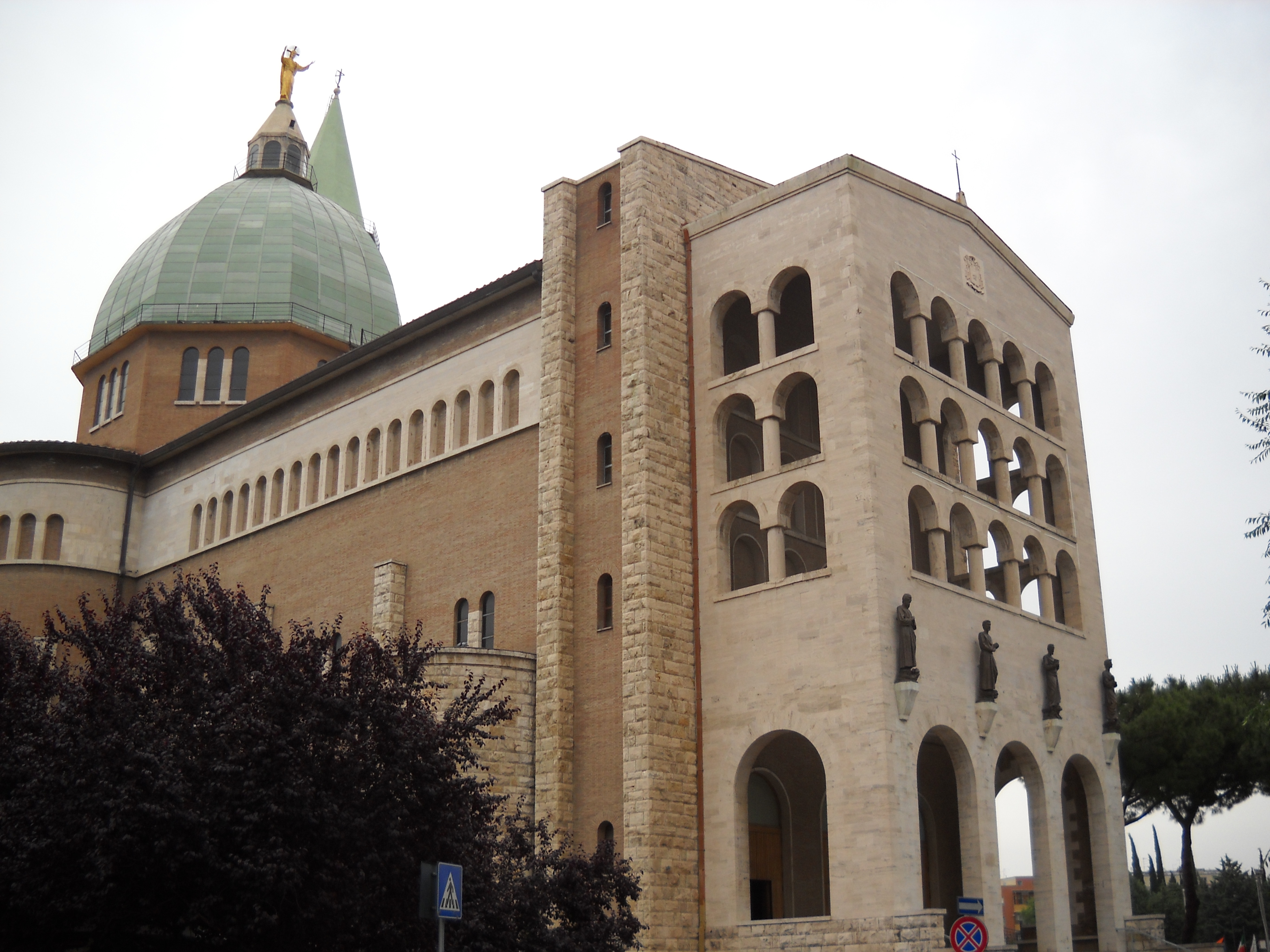
Basilica of Sacro Cuore di Gesù, Grosseto

- ONMI Building (1933–1934) in Grosseto
- Elementary School (1934) in Sassofortino
- Restoration of Palazzo Stella d'Italia (1934) in Grosseto
- Episcopal Seminary (1934–1936) in Grosseto
- Church of San Giuseppe (1935–1940) in Grosseto
- Church of San Guglielmo d'Aquitania (1935–1940) in Braccagni
- Clergy house of the Grosseto Cathedral (1936) in Grosseto
- Orphanage for boys "Giuseppe Garibaldi" (1936) in Grosseto
- Orphanage for girls "San Lorenzo" (1936) in Grosseto
- Church of Medaglia Miracolosa (1936–1937) a Grosseto
- Episcopal Seminary (1936) in Roccatederighi
- Church of Santi Paolo e Barbara (1938–1941) in Ribolla
- Church of San Rocco (1946–1948) in Marina di Grosseto
- Church of San Giuseppe Benedetto Cottolengo (1946–1951) in Grosseto
- Medical Dispensary (1948–1952) in Massa Marittima
- Medical Dispensary (1948–1952) in Grosseto
- Agricultural Technical Institute (1949–1953) in Grosseto
- Church of Santa Maria Ausliatrice (1950) in Marrucheti
- Medical Dispensary (1950-1955) in Orbetello
- Church of Santa Maria Goretti (1951–1952) in Fonteblanda
- Retirement home "Francini" (1952) in Grosseto
- Church of Santa Maria delle Grazie (1953–1957) in Albinia
- Basilica of Sacro Cuore di Gesù (1954–1958) in Grosseto
- Church of Apparizione (1956) in Montenero, Livorno
- Church of San Giuseppe Lavoratore (1956–1957) in Bagno di Gavorrano
- Church of Santi Lorenzo e Mamiliano (1958) in Giglio Porto
- Church of Santa Margherita (1958) in Poggi del Sasso
- Church of Madonna del Rosario (1958) in Pian d'Alma
- Church of San Donato (1958–1961) in San Donato
- Church of Nostra Signora del Sacro Cuore (1959) in Bagnore
- Church of San Giovanni (1963) in Semproniano
- Restoration of the church of Misercordia (1968) in Grosseto

== Sources ==
- Guerrini, Giuseppe (1996). La Diocesi di Grosseto. Parrocchie, chiese e altri luoghi di culto, dalle origini ai nostri giorni. Roccastrada: Il mio amico.
- Elisabetta Insabato; Cecilia Ghelli, eds. (2007). Guida agli archivi di architetti e ingegneri del Novecento in Toscana. Florence: Edifir.
- Catalani, Barbara; Del Francia, Marco; Tombari, Giovanni (2011). Itinerari di architettura contemporanea. Grosseto e provincia. Pisa: Edizioni ETS.
- Enrico Crispolti; Anna Mazzanti; Luca Quattrocchi, eds. (2005). Arte in Maremma nella prima metà del Novecento. Milan: Silvana Editoriale.
