= Basilica of Sacro Cuore di Gesù, Grosseto =

Basilica of Sacro Cuore di Gesù
- Basilica of the Sacred Heart of Jesus
- Basilica del Sacro Cuore di Gesù (Italian)
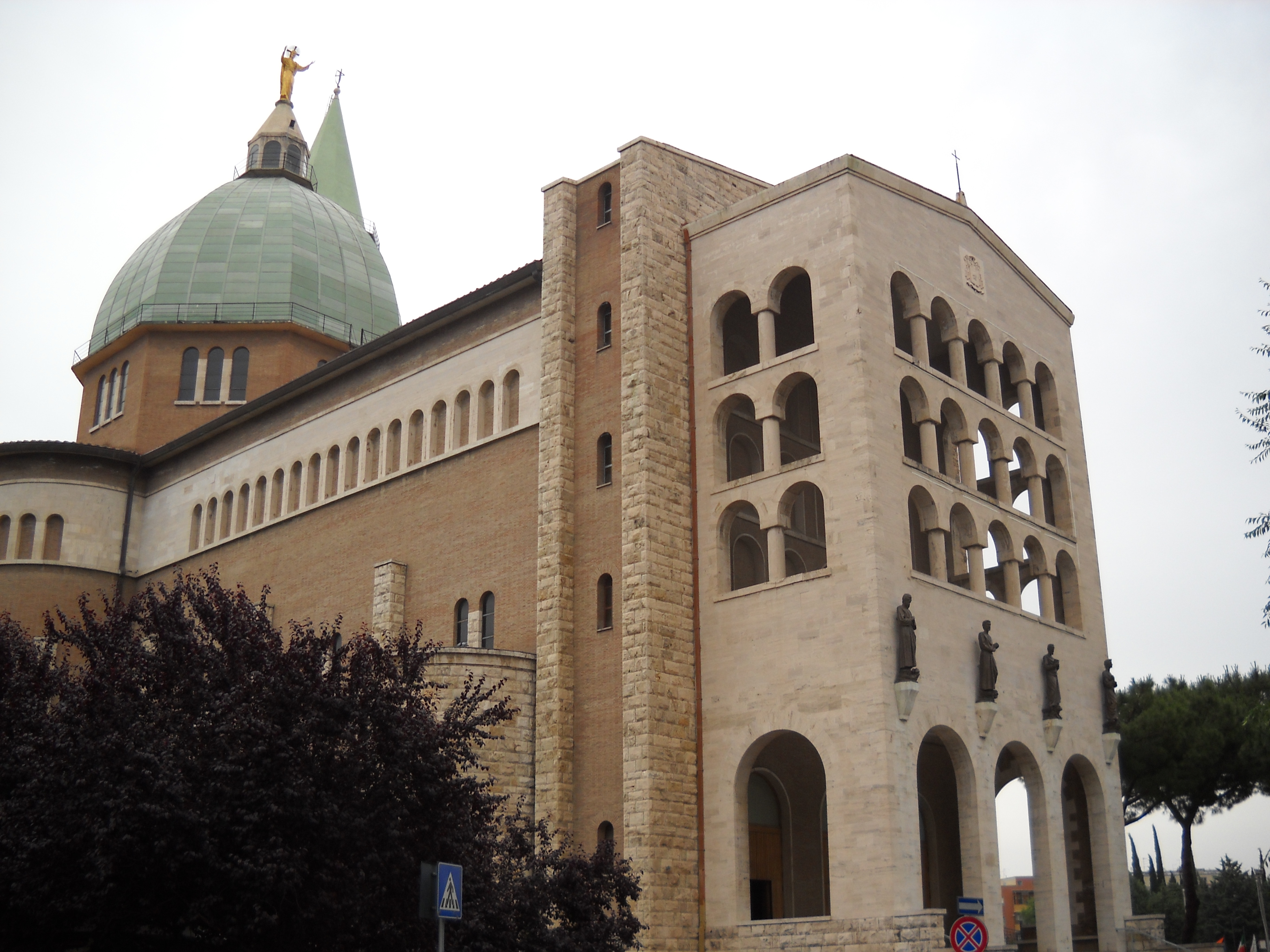
- Basilica of Sacro Cuore di Gesù
- 42.768231°N 11.114281°E
- Location: Grosseto, Tuscany
- Address: Piazza Paolo Galeazzi / Via della Pace
- Country: Italy
- Denomination: Roman Catholic
- Tradition: Latin Rite
- Website: Official website

History
- Status: Minor basilica Parish church
- Consecrated: 26 April 1958; 68 years ago

Architecture
- Architect: Ernesto Ganelli
- Architectural type: Basilica
- Groundbreaking: 1954
- Completed: 1958

Administration
- Diocese: Diocese of Grosseto

Sacro Cuore di Gesù (Sacred Heart of Jesus) is a minor basilica in Grosseto, Tuscany, Italy.

The church was commissioned by the bishop of Grosseto Paolo Galeazzi, who intended to pay homage to the fallen in the 1943 Grosseto bombing. On 26 April 1943, the day of Easter Monday, the city was bombed by the Americans, who concentrated on targeting civilians. 134 civilians died that day, including children who were playing in a funfair set up outside the city walls.

The building was designed by engineer Ernesto Ganelli. Construction began in 1954 and was completed in four years. On 26 April 1958, the 15th anniversary of the bombing, bishop Paolo Galeazzi consecrated the church that was elevated to minor basilica by pope Pius XII on 6 June.

Sacro Cuore di Gesù is decorated with bronze sculptures by artist Tolomeo Faccendi. The decorations include the fourteen stations of the Cross (1954–55) in the nave-aisles, the four Evangelists (1957) on the main facade, the Christ the Redeemer (1958) on the top of the dome, and the Pietà (1960) inside the crypt. The crypt is also decorated with the names of those who died in all World War II bombings in Grosseto; bishop Galeazzi, who died in 1971, was buried in the crypt.
