= Marrucheti =

- Frazione
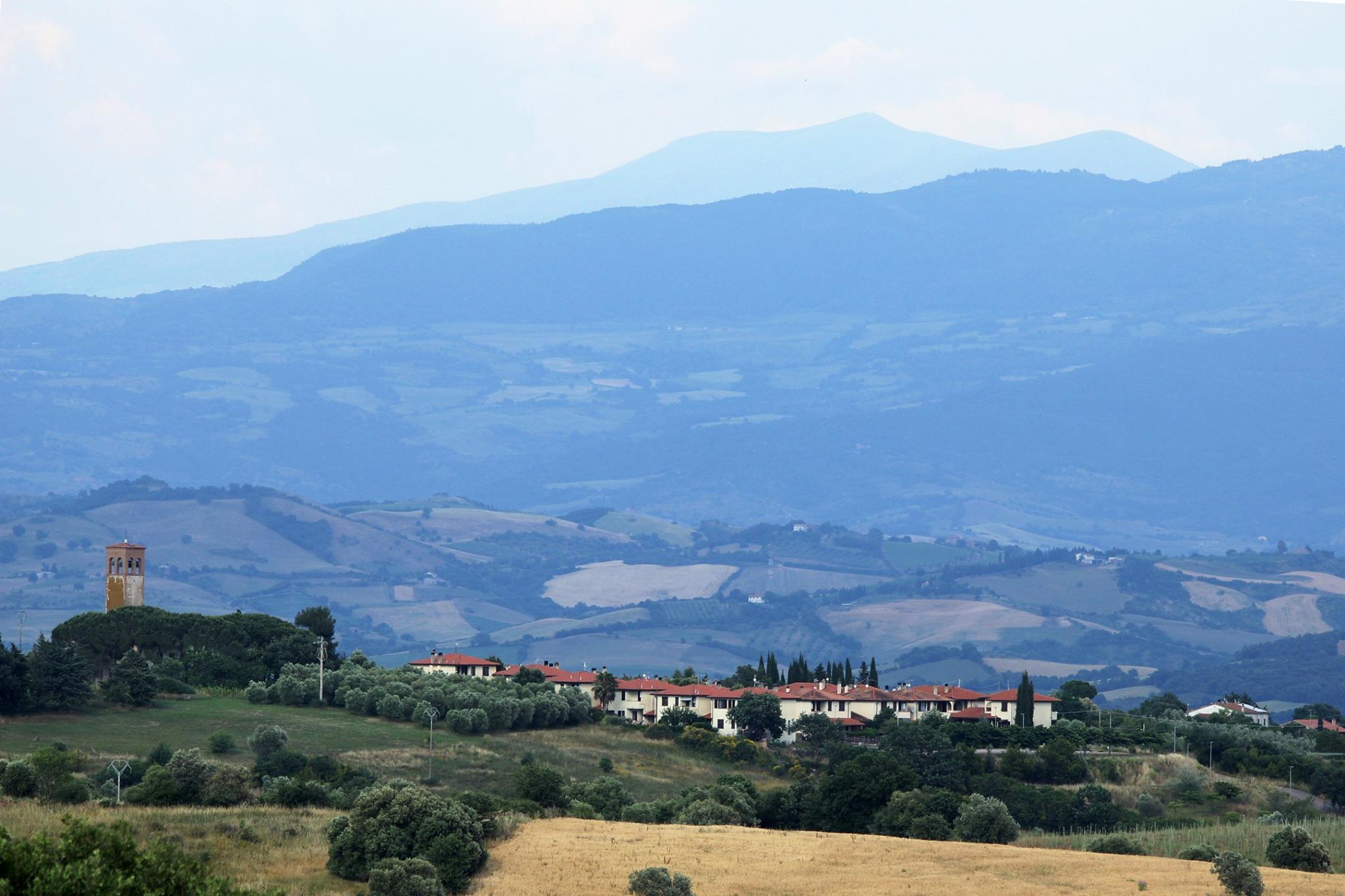
- View of Marrucheti

- Location of Marrucheti in Italy
- Coordinates: 42°49′29″N 11°13′19″E
- Country: Italy
- Region: Tuscany
- Province: Grosseto (GR)
- Comune: Campagnatico
- Elevation: 115 m (377 ft)

Population (2011)
  - Total: 104
- Demonym: Marruchetani
- Time zone: UTC+1 (CET)
  - Summer (DST): UTC+2 (CEST)
- Postal code: 58042
- Dialing code: (+39) 0564

Marrucheti is a village in Tuscany, central Italy, administratively a frazione of the comune of Campagnatico, province of Grosseto. At the time of the 2001 census its population amounted to 90.

Marrucheti is about 14 km from Grosseto and 12 km from Campagnatico, and it is situated on the ancient road between Campagnatico and Istia d'Ombrone. The village was formerly known as Campino.

== Main sights ==
- Church of Santa Maria Ausiliatrice, main parish church of the village, it was designed by engineer Ernesto Ganelli and built in 1947.
- Chapel of Casetta Manini, a little church built in 1922.
- Castle of Stertignano (13th century), ancient castle situated a few kilometres west of the centre of Marrucheti.

== Bibliography ==
- Aldo Mazzolai, Guida della Maremma. Percorsi tra arte e natura, Le Lettere, Florence, 1997

== See also ==
- Arcille
- Campagnatico
- Montorsaio
