= Tolomeo Faccendi =

Italian sculptor

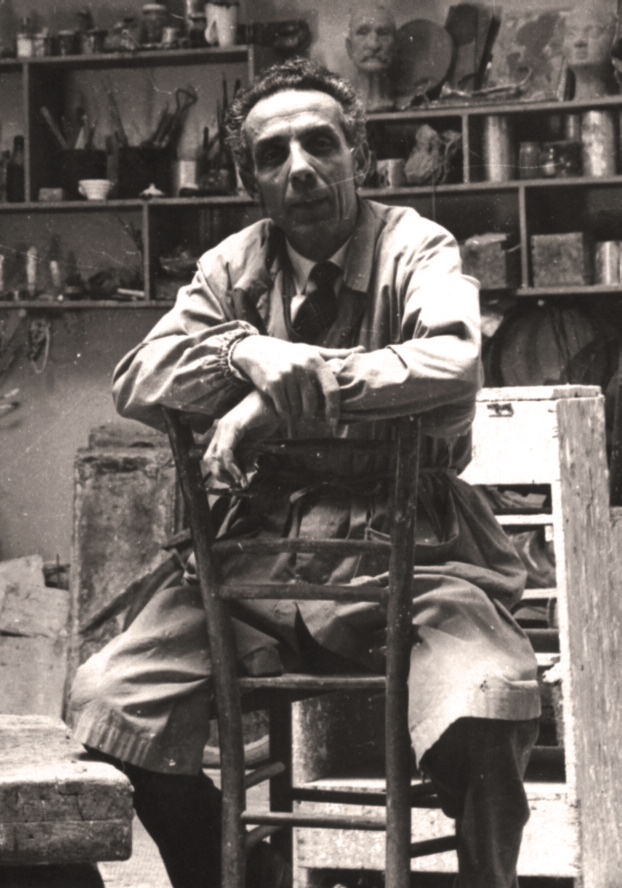
- Faccendi in 1957
- Born: 8 November 1905; Grosseto, Kingdom of Italy
- Died: 11 September 1970 (aged 64); Grosseto, Italy
- Occupation: Sculptor

Tolomeo Faccendi (8 November 1905 – 11 September 1970) was an Italian sculptor, active mainly in his native Tuscany.

== Biography ==
He trained in the workshop of Ivo Pacini and became one of the prominent artists of the 20th-century artistic movement in Grosseto.

Faccendi participated at the 21st Venice Biennale in 1938 and at the 4th Rome Quadriennale in 1943.

He created various public sculptures in his hometown, including the puledro (1933), the cinghialino (1950), the buttero (1953), and the statue of saint Francis of Assisi (1965) next to the church of San Francesco. Faccendi sculpted the bronze religious decorations – the Christ the Redeemer, the Four Evangelists, the Via Crucis, and a Pietà – for the Basilica of Sacred Heart of Jesus in Grosseto (1954–1960).

== Bibliography ==
- Guerrini, Giuseppe (1971). Tolomeo Faccendi e la sua opera. Grosseto: La Commerciale.
- Marziali, Giovanni (1993). Tolomeo Faccendi scultore. Viterbo: Ceccarelli.
- Enrico Crispolti; Anna Mazzanti; Luca Quattrocchi, eds. (2005). Arte in Maremma nella prima metà del Novecento. Milan: Silvana Editoriale.
