= Enrico Crispolti =

Italian art critic, curator and art historian

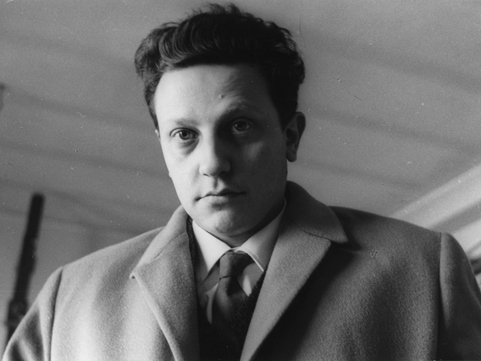
- Born: Enrico Crispolti; 18 April 1933; Rome, Kingdom of Italy
- Died: 8 December 2018 (aged 85); Rome
- Occupation: art critic

Enrico Crispolti (18 April 1933 – 8 December 2018) was an Italian art critic, curator and art historian. From 1984 to 2005, he was professor of history of contemporary art at the Università degli Studi di Siena, and director of the school of specialisation in art history. He previously taught at the Accademia di Belle Arti in Rome (1966–1973) and at the Università degli Studi di Salerno (1973–1984). He was author of the catalogues raisonnés of the works of Enrico Baj, Lucio Fontana and Renato Guttuso. He died in Rome on 8 December 2018.

== Exhibitions ==
Crispolti curated many contemporary art exhibitions and events, including four editions of Alternative Attuali in L'Aquila (1962, 1963, 1965, 1968), three editions of the Biennale of Metal and Ceramics in Gubbio (1973, 1974, 1975), the 5th and 6th Biennial of Sacred Art in San Gabriele (1992, 1994), the 9th International Sculpture Biennale of Carrara (1998), as well as sections of the Venice Biennale, including Ambiente come sociale (1976), The New Soviet Art: An Unofficial Perspective (1977), and Megastructural Imagination from Futurism to Today (1978), Boccaccio’s Decameron on 100 Etching Interpretations by Petru Rusu (1986).

Other exhibitions he organized include Six Italian Painters from the 1940s to the Present Day (Municipal Gallery of Contemporary Art, Arezzo, 1967),The imaginary Organic, (Forte Belvedere, Florence, 1992), A! Que bien!, Resistes (Galleria Comunale d'Arte Contemporanea, Arezzo, 1994); Art and State (Museo Revoltella], Trieste and Palazzo delle Albere, Trento 1997) and Art in the early 20th Century in Maremma (Grosseto, 2006).

Crispolti's work focused mostly on Futurism. He curated the first major retrospective of Giacomo Balla at the Civic Gallery of Modern Art in Turin in 1963, with Maria Drudi Gambillo, as well as major surveys like Futurism and Fashion (PAC, Milan, 1988); Italiens Moderne: Futurismus und Rationalismus (Fridericianum Museum, Kassel and IVAM, Valencia 1990), Futurism (Tokyo, Sapporo, Sendas, Otsu, 1992), Futuristickà rekonstrukce vesmíru (Prague 1994), Futurism and the South of Italy (Royal Palace, Naples, 1996), The Great Themes of Futurism 1909–1944 (Palazzo Ducale, Genoa and Fondazione Mazzotta, Milan, 1998), Le Futurisme (Fondation Hermitage, Lausanne, 1998); Futurism through Tuscany (Museo Fattori, Villa Mimbelli, Livorno, 2000); Futurism (Palazzo delle Esposizioni, Rome, 2001); and From Futurism to Abstraction (Museo del Corso, Rome, 2002).

He also curated several retrospectives of contemporary artists, including Mauro Reggiani (Galleria Civica d'Arte Moderna, Turin, 1973); Corrado Cagli (Palazzo degli Anziani, Ancona 1980; Castel dell'Ovo, Naples 1982; Magazzini del Sale, Siena 1984); Renato Guttuso (Reggio Emilia, St. Francis Church, Como; Archaeological Museum of Salerno, 1983); Pietro Cascella (Magazzini del Sale, Siena 1985; L'Aquila, alternative attuali, Fausto Cheng, Sergio Nannicola, Pietro Cascella, Giuseppe Fiducia, de Leonibus Forte Spagnolo, L'Aquila 1987; Ignazio Gadaleta (Municipal Gallery of Contemporary Art, Arezzo, 1990); Edgardo Mannucci (Palazzo Braschi, Rome 1991); Enrico Prampolini (Palazzo delle Esposizioni, Rome, 1992); Valeriano Trubbiani (Palazzo Ricci, Macerata, 1997); Francesco Somaini (Brera Academy, Milan, 1997); Lucio Fontana (Palazzo delle Esposizioni, Rome, 1998; Centenario, Milan, 1999; and Fundacion Proa, Buenos Aires, 1999); Guido Pajetta (Villa Reale, Monza,); and Mario Ceroli (Castello Svevo, Bari, 2003).

== Selected publications ==
- (with Paolo Campiglio), Carriera "barocca" di Fontana. Taccuino critico 1959–2004 e Carteggio 1958–1967, Amedeo Porro Arte Contemporanea e Skira, Milan, 2004
- Mario Ceroli, (Foto 27), Motta, Milan, 2003
- Fathi Hassan, Edizioni Della Rovere, Rome, 2002
- Immaginazione Aurea, Mole Antonelliana, Ancona, 2001
- Kuetani, Kosanji, Temple Museum, Hiroshima, 2000)
- L'oggetto Morandi, Cadmio, Florence, 1998
- Come studiare l'arte contemporanea, Donzelli, Rome, 1997
- Relazione conclusiva del Rapporto sul Sistema dell’Arte Moderna e Contemporanea in Toscana, Regione Toscana, Florence, 1996
- (with Mauro Pratesi), La pittura in Italia: Il Novecento 3. Le ultime ricerche, Electa, Milan, 1994
- L'arte del disegno del Novecento italiano Laterza, Rome, 1990
- Confronto Indiscreto, Accademia d’Egitto, Rome, 1988
- Alternative Attuali, L'Aquila 1987
- Storia e critica del Futurismo, Laterza, Rome, 1986
- Il Futurismo e la moda. Balla e gli altri, Marsilio, Venice, 1986
- I Basaldella: Dino, Mirko, Afro, Casamassima, Udine, 1984)
- Renato Guttuso, Giorgio Mondadori, Milan, 1983
- Extra Media. Esperienze attuali di comunicazione estetica, Foto 32, Studio Forma, Turino, 1978
- Arti visive e partecipazione sociale, De Donato, Bari, 1977
- Peter Phillips, Idea, Milan, 1977
- Erotismo nell'arte astratta Celebes, Trapani, 1976
- Sociologia e iconologia del Pop Art, Fiorentino, Naples, 1975
- Lucio Fontana, La Connaissance, Brussels, 1974
- Enrico Baj, Bolaffi, Turin, 1973
- Francesco Somaini: Urgenza nella città, Mazzotta, Milan, 1972
- L'Informale. Storia e poetica, Carucci, Assisi-Rome, 1971
- Surrealismo, 1969
- Il mito della macchina e altri temi del Futurismo, Celebes editore, Trapani, 1969
- Ricerche dopo l'Informale, Officina, Rome, 1968
- Il Secondo Futurismo: 5 pittori + 1 scultore, Pozzo, Turin, 1962
