= Anselmo Fauli =

Italian Catholic bishop (1817–1876)

Most Reverend Anselmo Fauli
- Bishop of Grosseto
- Church: Catholic Church
- Diocese: Diocese of Grosseto
- In office: 1867–1876
- Predecessor: Giovanni Domenico Mensini
- Successor: Giovanni Battista Bagalà Blasini

Orders
- Ordination: 21 November 1841
- Consecration: 24 March 1867 by Niccola Paracciani Clarelli

Personal details
- Born: Francesco Fauli; 17 September 1817 Santa Lucia, Prato, Grand Duchy of Tuscany
- Died: 30 January 1876 (aged 58) Capalle, Campi Bisenzio, Province of Florence, Kingdom of Italy

Francesco Fauli (17 September 1817 – 30 January 1876), known as Anselmo Fauli, was an Italian Catholic prelate who served as Bishop of Grosseto (1867–1876).

== Biography ==
Born Francesco Fauli in Santa Lucia, a village near Prato, in 1817, he was ordained a priest in the Diocese of Prato as part of the Order of the Blessed Virgin Mary of Mount Carmel. On 22 February 1867, Pope Pius IX appointed him Bishop of Grosseto during a secret consistory, filling a vacancy that had lasted since 1858 due to the death of Bishop Giovanni Domenico Mensini and the political upheavals of the Italian Risorgimento. Fauli was officially consecrated bishop on 24 March 1867, in Rome by Cardinal Niccola Paracciani Clarelli and formally took office in the diocese on August 10 of that year.

He participated in the First Vatican Council convened by Pope Pius IX in 1869 and was present in Rome during the historic breach of Porta Pia by Italian troops on 20 September 1870.

On 28 January 1876, after falling ill with a high fever, he decided to visit his family. However, shortly after arriving at the Florence station, he died in the village of Capalle, Campi Bisenzio, assisted by his brother Lorenzo.

== Sources ==
- Fantappiè, Carlo (1995). "FAÙLI, Francesco". Dizionario Biografico degli Italiani (in Italian). Vol. 45: Farinacci–Fedrigo. Rome: Istituto dell'Enciclopedia Italiana. ISBN 978-88-12-00032-6.
- Minucci, Giotto (1988). La città di Grosseto e i suoi vescovi (498-1988) [The city of Grosseto and its bishops (498-1988)]. Florence: Lucio Pugliese. (in Italian)
- Remigius Ritzler; Pirminus Sefrin (1978). Hierarchia catholica Medii et recentioris aevi (in Latin). Vol. VIII (1846–1903). Il Messaggero di S. Antonio.

Catholic Church titles
Preceded by Giovanni Domenico Mensini	Bishop of Grosseto; 1867–1876	Succeeded by Giovanni Battista Bagalà Blasini
