= Francesco Spagnesi =

Italian Catholic priest in prison for buying drugs with church funds

- Church: Roman Catholic
- Diocese: Prato

Orders
- Ordination: 2007

Personal details
- Born: 1981 (age 44–45)
- Occupation: Priest
- Criminal information
- Convictions: Embezzlement, drug dealing, trafficking, misappropriation (2021)
- Penalty: 3 years, 8 months

Francesco Spagnesi (born 1981) is a Roman Catholic priest from the Italian Catholic Diocese of Prato, in Tuscany Italy, who was sentenced to three years in prison in late 2021 for "stealing thousands of euros in church funds and donations to buy drugs for gay sex parties that he hosted". According to Costanza Malerba, the attorney representing Spagnesi, as of mid-September 2021 Spagnesi had "already confessed" to having supplied drugs at his house parties and will "soon" be confessing "to misappropriating church funds". Also as of mid-September, police were interviewing approximately "200 people" who are said to have attended Spagnesi’s parties over the last few years. Spagnesi is accused of withdrawing "more than" €100,000 ($117,000) from his parish's bank account, and after his access to the account was cut off by his bishop, taking money from the church "collection plate and soliciting money directly from parishioners", insisting he was raising money for low-income families.

Spagnesi, formerly the pastor of Annunciation parish, was placed under house arrest 14 September 2021, and as of 25 September was being investigated for deliberately causing “serious harm” to former intimate partners by failing to reveal his positive HIV status. According to italy24news, two of the regular party goers have "declared that they are HIV-positive". Spagnesi and his roommate Alessio Regina are thought to have used "gay hookup sites to invite other guests to sex parties, where Spagnesi would use and also sell the drugs". According to the police, GBL (“liquid ecstasy", "a staple of gay chemsex parties") and cocaine, were ordered online, imported from the Netherlands, and sold to people who attended parties at the Prato residence of Spagnesi and Regina.

The priest is reported to have entered the priesthood after dropping out of medical school "to dedicate his life to religion". He was considered "young, brilliant, all-involving and refined" by his parishioners who “had great faith” in him, according to a local newspaper, La Nazione. They have now instigated legal action to retrieve their money.

Spagnesi's bishop, Giovanni Nerbini, expressed “great sorrow” and promised “full collaboration” in the investigation. Spagnesi has expressed remorse and blamed cocaine for his actions. Now he study Medicine in Florence.
