= Francesco Piccolomini =

Francesco Piccolomini may refer to:

- Pope Pius III (1439–1503), born Francesco Todeschini Piccolomini
- Francesco Piccolomini (Jesuit) (1582–1651)
- Francesco Piccolomini (bishop of Grosseto) (died 1622)
- Francesco Piccolomini (philosopher) (1523–1607)
