= Pietro Fiordelli =

Italian clergyman and bishop

- Bishop emeritus of Prato
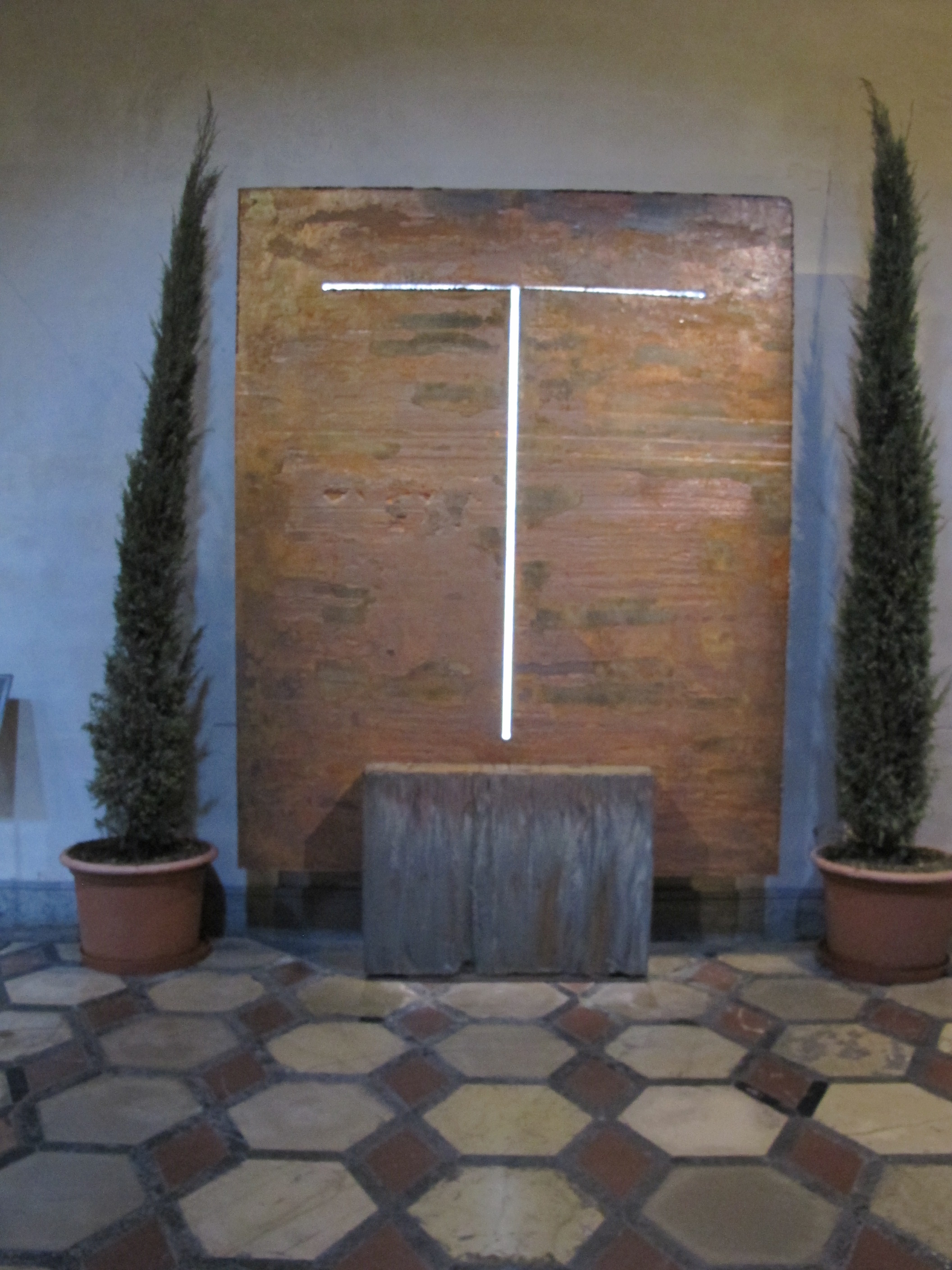
- Mgr Fordelli's grave
- Church: Roman Catholic Church
- See: Diocese of Prato
- In office: 1954 – 1991
- Successor: Gastone Simoni
- Previous posts: Priest and professor in Città di Castello

Orders
- Ordination: 16 November 1938
- Consecration: 17 July 1954 by Mgr Filippo Maria Cipriani

Personal details
- Born: 9 January 1916 Città di Castello, Italy
- Died: 23 December 2004 (aged 88) Prato, Italy

Styles of Pietro Fiordelli
- Reference style: The Most Reverend
- Spoken style: Your Excellency
- Religious style: Monsignor
- Posthumous style: none

Bishop Pietro Fiordelli (9 January 1916 – 23 December 2004) was an Italian Roman Catholic bishop, first residential bishop of Prato.

== Biography ==
Monsignor Pietro Fiordelli was born in Città di Castello on 1916, he had a brother named Furio and three sisters, Gina, Maria and Dina. Ordained priest on November 6, 1938, and graduated at Pontifical Lateran University. After 16 years of ministry in Città di Castello, on 7 July 1954 he was appointed bishop of Prato by pope Pius XII; on following 3 October he was consecrated by bishop Filippo Maria Cipriani, being the youngest Italian bishop of the time.

Monsignor Fiordelli held the office of bishop for 37 years, welcoming Saint pope John Paul II on March 19, 1986, on a visit to Prato. On December 7, 1991, he left the office for having reached the age limit. Bishop Pietro Fiordelli died, after a long illness, on the morning of December 23, 2004.

== Attack on the bishop ==
Bishop Fiordelli was known in 1958 for having defined the Bellandi family (Mauro Bellandi and Loriana Nunziati) public sinners, a couple of citizens of Prato who had "married in a civil ceremony". Monsignor Fiordelli was tried for defamation: he was sentenced in the first instance to pay a fine of 40.000 liras, and acquitted on appeal for the unquestionable act.

== Sources ==
- Official website of the Diocese of Prato (in Italian)

}

Catholic Church titles
Preceded by	Bishop of Prato; 7 July 1954 – 7 December 1991	Succeeded by Gastone Simoni
