= Diocese of Grosseto =

Roman Catholic diocese in Italy

Coordinates: 42.7722°N 11.1089°E

Diocese of Grosseto Dioecesis Grossetana

Catholic
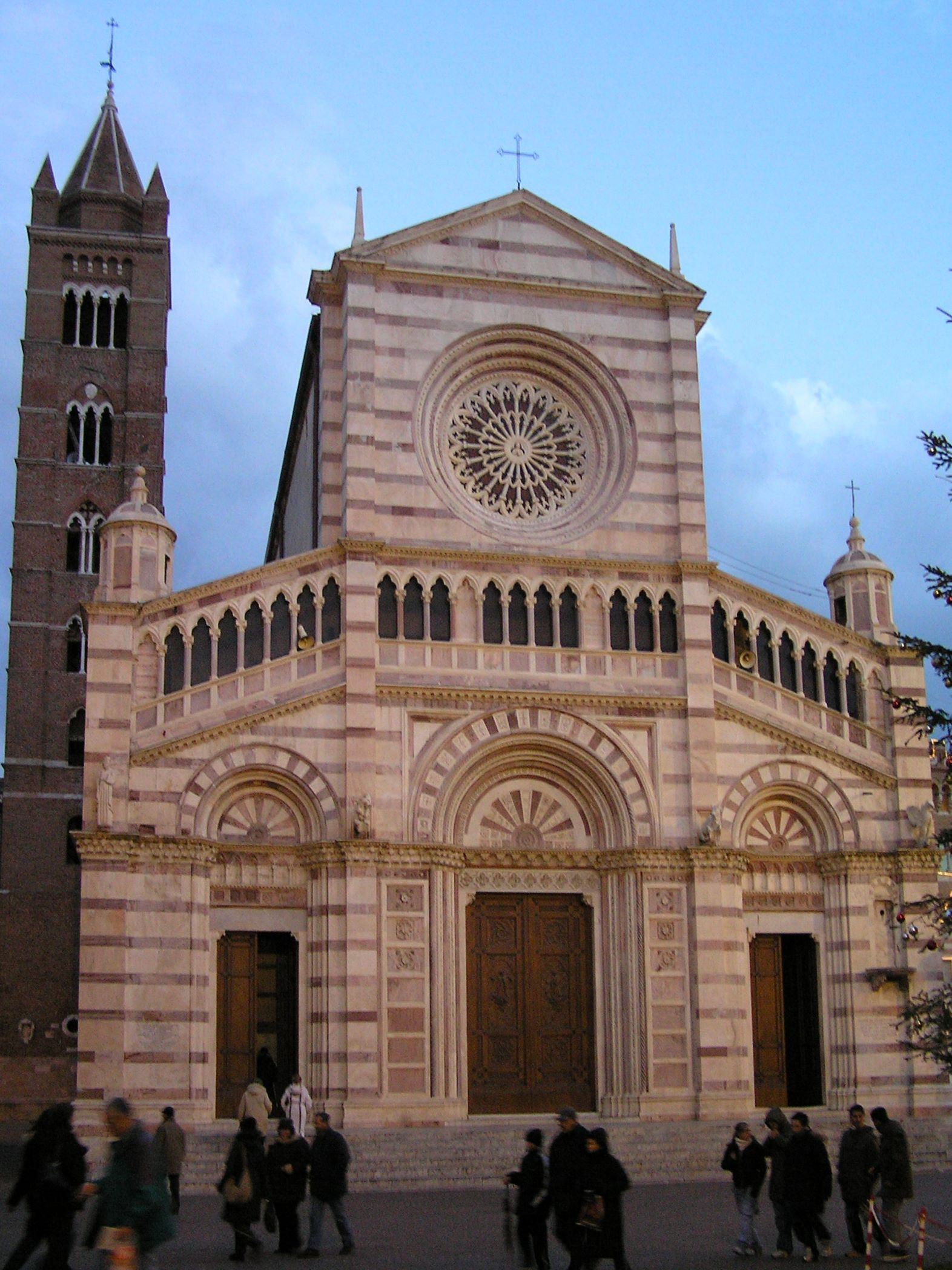
- Grosseto Cathedral

Location
- Country: Italy
- Ecclesiastical province: Siena-Colle di Val d'Elsa-Montalcino

Statistics
- Area: 1,239 km^{2} (478 sq mi)
- Population: Total; Catholics: (as of 2016); 132,000; 128,920
- Parishes: 50

Information
- Denomination: Catholic Church
- Sui iuris church: Latin Church
- Rite: Roman Rite
- Established: transferred 9 April 1138
- Cathedral: Cattedrale di S. Lorenzo
- Secular priests: 47 (diocesan); 19 (Religious Orders); 6 Permanent Deacons

Current leadership
- Pope: Leo XIV
- Bishop: Bernardino Giordano
- Bishops emeritus: Rodolfo Cetoloni; Giovanni Roncari

Map

Website
- Diocesi di Grosseto (in Italian)

The Diocese of Grosseto (Latin: Dioecesis Grossetana) is a Latin Church diocese of the Catholic Church in Italy, a suffragan of the archdiocese of Siena-Colle di Val d'Elsa-Montalcino, in Tuscany. Its current bishop is Bernardino Giordano.

== History ==
Rusellæ was an episcopal city from the fifth century. In January 591, Pope Gregory I appointed Balbinus, Bishop of Rusellæ, to be the Apostolic Visitor to the diocese of Populonia.

On 9 April 1138, Pope Innocent II transferred the see to Grosseto, citing the large number of robbers in the area and the reduction of the people of the area to desolation and poverty. Rolandus, the last Bishop of Roselle, became the first Bishop of Grosseto. The transfer, however, did not proceed without incident. Some of the Canons of the cathedral of Roselle decided to stay in their accustomed home, and therefore demanded an apportionment of the Chapter's property with the Canons who had migrated to Grosseto. The dispute finally was submitted to Rome. On 23 December 1143, Pope Clement III wrote to the Provost and Chapter of Grosseto, ordering that the property and rights (to the tithe, and to death duties, for example) should be divided between the two groups; that the Canons in Roselle should elect their own Prior; but that they owed obedience to the bishop of Grosseto and due reverence to the Chapter of Grosseto.

=== Synods ===
A diocesan synod was an irregularly held, but important, meeting of the bishop of a diocese and his clergy. Its purpose was (1) to proclaim generally the various decrees already issued by the bishop; (2) to discuss and ratify measures on which the bishop chose to consult with his clergy; (3) to publish statutes and decrees of the diocesan synod, of the provincial synod, and of the Holy See.

Bishop Restaurus (1306–1328) held a diocesan synod in Grosseto in November 1320.

On 14–15 April 1692, Bishop Cesare Ugolini (1665–1699) presided over a diocesan synod in Grosseto, and issued statutes which were published. On 21–22 April 1705, a diocesan synod was held by Bishop Giacomo Falconetti (1703–1710).

From 1858 to 1867, for political and economic reasons, the see remained vacant.

== List of bishops ==
=== Bishops of Roselle ===
...

- Vitalianus (attested 499)

...

- Balbinus (attested 591, 595)

...

- Theodorus (attested c. 650)

...

- Valerianus (attested 680)

...

- Gaudioso (attested 715)

...

- Rauperto (attested 826)

...

- Otto (attested 853, 861)

...

- Radaldus (attested 967)
- Rainerius (attested 1015)

...
[~~Otto~~]

- Crescentius (attested 1036)
- Gerardus (attested 1050−1060)
- Dodo (attested 1060–1078)

[Baulfus] (Ballolfo) (circa 1090)

- Ildebrandus (attested 1101–1108)
- Berardus (attested 1118)
- Rolandus (c. 1133–1138)

=== Bishops of Grosseto ===
==== 1138 to 1500 ====
- Rolandus (1133–1138–1160?)
- Martinus (attested 1174–1179)
- Gualfredus (attested 1187–1189)
- Azzo (1210)
- Hermannus (1212–1216)
- Pepus (Petrus ?) (1216–?)
- Azio I (30 Apr 1240 – ?)
- Ugo di Ugurgeri (attested 1262)
- Azio II (1265–1277)
- Bartolomeo da Amelia (1278–1291?)
- Offreduccio (13 Mar 1291 – 1295)
- Giovanni 1296–1305)
- Restauro (1306–1328)
- Filippo Bencivenne (1328–1330)
- Angelo da Porta Sole (12 Feb 1330 – 22 Feb 1334)
- Angelo Cerretani (17 Jun 1334 – Feb 1349)
- Benedetto Cerretani (21 Oct 1349 – 1383)
- Giacomo Tolomei (1384 – 26 Jan 1390)
- Angelo Malavolti (14 Nov 1390 – ?)
- Giovanni (1400)
- Antonio Malavolti (1400–1406)
- Francesco Bellanti (1407 – 6 Jul 1417)
- Giovanni Pecci (15 Dec 1417 – 1 Mar 1426 Died)

Cardinal Antonio Casini (1427–1439) Administrator
Cardinal Giuliano Cesarini (1439–1444) Administrator

- Memmo Agazzari (1445–1452)
- Giovanni Agazzari (1452 – 1468 or 1471 or 1488)
- Giovanni Pannocchieschi d'Elci (1471–1488 Died)
- Andreoccio Ghinucci (9 Mar 1489 – 1497 Died)
- Raffaello Petrucci (4 Aug 1497 – 11 Dec 1522 Died)

==== 1500 to 1800 ====
- Ferdinando Ponzetti (Poncetti) (22 Dec 1522 – 25 Feb 1527 Resigned)
- Wolfgang Goler (25 Feb – Jul, 1527 Died)
- Marco Antonio Campeggi (23 Mar 1528 – 7 May 1553 Died)
- Fabio Mignanelli (17 May 1553 – 2 Oct 1553 Resigned)
- Giacomo Mignanelli (2 Oct 1553 – 1576)
- Claudio Borghese (22 Aug 1576 – 1590)
- Clemente Polito (1591–1606)
- Giulio Sansedoni (20 Nov 1606 – 1611 Resigned)
- Francesco Piccolomini (17 Aug 1611 – May 1622 Died)
- Girolamo Tantucci (11 Jul 1622 – 1636 Died)
- Ascanio Turamini (2 Mar 1637 – 2 Sep 1647 Died)
- Giovanni Battista Gori Pannilini (1 Mar 1649 – 1662 Died)
- Giovanni Pellei (11 Feb – 8 Jul 1664)
- Cesare Ugolini (13 Apr 1665 – Dec 1699)
- Sebastiano Perissi (1700–1701)
- Giacomo Falconetti (15 Jan 1703 – Apr 1710)
- Bernardino Pecci (15 Dec 1710 – 1 Jun 1736)
- Antonio Maria Franci (6 May 1737 – 10 Apr 1790)
- Fabrizio Selvi (17 Jun 1793 – 9 Jun 1835 Resigned)

==== since 1837 ====
- Giovanni Domenico Mensini (1837–1858)

Sede vacante (1858–1867)

- Anselmo Fauli (1867–1876)
- Giovanni Battista Bagalà Blasini (1876–1884)
- Bernardino Caldaioli (1884–1907)
- Ulisse Carlo Bascherini (1907–1920 Retired)
- Gustavo Matteoni (8 Mar 1920 – 3 Mar 1932 Appointed, Coadjutor Archbishop of Siena)
- Paolo Galeazzi (16 Sep 1932 – 10 Aug 1971 Died)
- Primo Gasbarri (16 Oct 1971 – 22 Jan 1979 Resigned)
- Adelmo Tacconi (23 Mar 1979 – 20 Jul 1991 Retired)
- Angelo Scola (20 Jul 1991 – 14 Sep 1995 Resigned)
- Giacomo Babini (13 Jul 1996 – 17 Nov 2001 Resigned)
- Franco Agostinelli (17 Nov 2001 – 29 Sep 2012 Appointed, Bishop of Prato)
- Rodolfo Cetoloni (28 May 2013 – 19 Jun 2021 Retired)
- Giovanni Roncari, OFMCap (19 Jun 2021 – 19 Dec 2024)
- Bernardino Giordano (since 19 December 2024)

== Parishes ==
The 50 parishes of the diocese all fall within the province of Grosseto, in Tuscany. They are divided into four pastoral areas (urban, sub-urban, coastal and hills).

- Grosseto urban area: San Lorenzo, San Francesco, San Giuseppe, San Giuseppe Benedetto Cottolengo, Sacro Cuore di Gesù, Santissimo Crocifisso, Maria Santissima Addolorata, Santa Lucia, Santa Famiglia, Beata Madre Teresa di Calcutta;
- Sub-urban area: Santa Maria (Alberese), San Guglielmo d'Aquitania (Braccagni), San Martino Vescovo (Batignano), San Vincenzo de' Paoli (Casotto dei Pescatori), Santissimo Salvatore (Istia d'Ombrone), Santi Stefano e Lorenzo in San Niccolò (Montepescali), Santa Maria Assunta (Nomadelfia), San Carlo Borromeo (Principina Terra), Santa Maria Goretti (Rispescia), Immacolata Concezione (Roselle);
- Coastal area: San Giuseppe (Bagno di Gavorrano), Santa Maria Assunta (Buriano), San Biagio (Caldana), San Giovanni Battista (Castiglione della Pescaia), San Giuliano (Gavorrano), Sant'Egidio (Giuncarico), San Rocco (Marina di Grosseto), Consolata (Punta Ala), San Leonardo (Ravi), San Martino in San Donato (Scarlino), Madonna delle Grazie (Scarlino Scalo), Sant'Andrea (Tirli), Santi Simone e Giuda (Vetulonia);
- Hills area: Madonna di Lourdes (Arcille), San Bartolomeo Apostolo (Boccheggiano), San Giovanni Battista (Campagnatico), San Donato (Casale di Pari), Maria Santissima Ausiliatrice (Marrucheti), Sant'Andrea Apostolo (Montemassi), San Cerbone (Montorsaio), Sant'Antonio Abate (Olmini di Sticciano), Santa Margherita (Poggi del Sasso), Santi Paolo e Barbara (Ribolla), San Niccolò (Roccastrada), San Martino (Roccatederighi), San Michele Arcangelo (Sasso d'Ombrone), San Michele Arcangelo (Sassofortino), Maria Santissima Madre della Chiesa (Sticciano), Santa Maria Assunta (Tatti), San Giovanni Battista (Torniella).

== Books ==
- Gams, Pius Bonifatius (1873). Series episcoporum Ecclesiae catholicae: quotquot innotuerunt a beato Petro apostolo. Ratisbon: Typis et Sumptibus Georgii Josephi Manz. p. 754-755. (Use with caution; obsolete)
- Eubel, Conradus, ed. (1913). Hierarchia catholica (in Latin). Vol. 1 (second ed.). Münster: Libreria Regensbergiana.
- Eubel, Conradus, ed. (1914). Hierarchia catholica (in Latin). Vol. 2 (second ed.). Münster: Libreria Regensbergiana.
- Eubel, Conradus; Gulik, Guilelmus (1923). Hierarchia catholica (in Latin). Vol. 3 (second ed.). Münster: Libreria Regensbergiana.
- Gauchat, Patritius (Patrice) (1935). Hierarchia catholica (in Latin). Vol. 4 (1592-1667). Münster: Libraria Regensbergiana.
- Ritzler, Remigius; Sefrin, Pirminus (1952). Hierarchia catholica medii et recentis aevi (in Latin). Vol. V (1667-1730). Patavii: Messagero di S. Antonio.
- Ritzler, Remigius; Sefrin, Pirminus (1958). Hierarchia catholica medii et recentis aevi. Vol. VI (1730-1799). Patavii: Messagero di S. Antonio.
- Ritzler, Remigius; Sefrin, Pirminus (1968). Hierarchia Catholica medii et recentioris aevi (in Latin). Vol. VII (1800–1846). Monasterii: Libreria Regensburgiana.
- Remigius Ritzler; Pirminus Sefrin (1978). Hierarchia catholica Medii et recentioris aevi (in Latin). Vol. VIII (1846–1903). Il Messaggero di S. Antonio.
- Pięta, Zenon (2002). Hierarchia catholica medii et recentioris aevi (in Latin). Vol. IX (1903–1922). Padua: Messagero di San Antonio. ISBN 978-88-250-1000-8.

=== Studies ===
- Cappelletti, Giuseppe (1862). Le chiese d'Italia dalla loro origine sino ai nostri giorni (in Italian). Vol. decimosettimo. Venezia: Antonelli. pp. 633–677.
- Citter, Carlo (ed.) (1996). Grosseto, Roselle e il Prile. Note per la storia di una città e del territorio circostante. Documenti di Archeologia 8. Mantova: Società Archeologica Padana. (in Italian)
- Kehr, Paul Fridolin (1908). Italia pontificia. vol. III. Berlin 1908. pp. 258–266. (in Latin)
- Lanzoni, Francesco (1927). Le diocesi d'Italia dalle origini al principio del secolo VII (an. 604). Faenza: F. Lega. (in Italian)
- Minucci, Giotto (1988). La città di Grosseto e i suoi vescovi (498-1988) [The city of Grosseto and its bishops (498–1988)]. Florence: Lucio Pugliese. (in Italian)
- Ronzani, Mauro (1996). "«Prima della «cattedrale»: le chiese del vescovato di Roselle - Grosseto dall'età tardo-antica all'inizio del secolo XIV," in: La cattedrale di Grosseto e il suo popolo 1295-1995. Atti del Convegno di studi storici Grosseto 3-4 novembre 1995 (Grosseto: I Portici, 1996), pp. 157–194. (in Italian)
- Schwartz, Gerhard (1913), Die Besetzung der Bistümer Reichsitaliens unter den sächsischen und salischen Kaisern : mit den Listen der Bischöfe, 951-1122, Leipzig-Berlin 1913, pp. 262–263 (Roselle). (in German)
- Ughelli, Ferdinando; Coleti, Nicolo (1718). Italia sacra sive de Episcopis Italiae, et insularum adjacentium (in Latin). Vol. Tomus tertius (secunda ed.). Venice: Apud Sebastianum Coleti. pp. 655–701.
