= Giulio Sansedoni =

Roman Catholic prelate

Most Reverend Giulio Sansedoni
- Bishop of Grosseto
- Church: Catholic Church
- Diocese: Diocese of Grosseto
- In office: 1606–1611
- Predecessor: Clemente Polito
- Successor: Francesco Piccolomini

Orders
- Ordination: 15 June 1577
- Consecration: 26 November 1606 by Girolamo Bernerio

Personal details
- Born: 28 March 1551 Siena, Republic of Siena
- Died: 19 December 1625 (aged 74)

Giulio Sansedoni (28 March 1551 – 19 December 1625) was a Roman Catholic prelate who served as Bishop of Grosseto (1606–1611).

== Biography ==
Giulio Sansedoni was born on 28 March 1551 in Siena, Italy and ordained a priest on 15 Jun 1577. On 20 November 1606, he was appointed during the papacy of Pope Paul V as Bishop of Grosseto. On 26 November 1606, he was consecrated bishop by Girolamo Bernerio, Cardinal-Bishop of Albano, with Paolo Alberi, Archbishop Emeritus of Dubrovnik, and Metello Bichi, Bishop Emeritus of Sovana, serving as co-consecrators. He served as Bishop of Grosseto until his resignation in 1611.

== Episcopal succession ==
While bishop, he was the principal co-consecrator of:

- Pierre de Donnauld, Titular Bishop of Tripolis in Phoenicia and Coadjutor Bishop of Mirepoix (1610);
- Jean Jaubert de Barrault, Bishop of Bazas (1611);
- János Telegdy, Bishop of Bosnia (1611);
- Malatesta Baglioni, Bishop of Pesaro (1612);
- Giuseppe di Ceva, Bishop of Ivrea (1614);
- Angelo Gozzadini, Archbishop of Naxos (1616);
- Petrus Pitarca, Bishop of Termia (1617);
- Cipriano Pavoni, Bishop of Rimini (1619);
- Francesco Nappi (bishop), Bishop of Polignano (1619);
- Alessandro d'Este, Bishop of Reggio Emilia (1622);
- Aloysius Galli, Bishop of Ancona e Numana (1622);
- Ferdinand Boschetti, Titular Archbishop of Caesarea in Cappadocia (1622);
- Eitel Frederick von Hohenzollern-Sigmaringen, Bishop of Osnabrück (1623);
- Baldassarre Bolognetti, Bishop of Nicastro (1624); and
- Giovanni Maria Belletti, Bishop of Gerace (1625).

== External links and additional sources ==
- Cheney, David M. "Diocese of Grosseto". Catholic-Hierarchy.org. (for Chronology of Bishops) ^{[self-published]}
- Chow, Gabriel. "Diocese of Grosseto (Italy)". GCatholic.org. (for Chronology of Bishops) ^{[self-published]}

Catholic Church titles
Preceded by Clemente Polito	Bishop of Grosseto; 1606–1611	Succeeded by Francesco Piccolomini (bishop)
