= Giovanni Battista Bagalà Blasini =

Italian Roman Catholic prelate

Most Reverend Giovanni Battista Bagalà Blasini
- Bishop of Grosseto
- Church: Catholic Church
- Diocese: Diocese of Grosseto
- In office: 1876–1884
- Predecessor: Anselmo Fauli
- Successor: Bernardino Caldaioli

Orders
- Consecration: 31 May 1868 by Niccola Paracciani Clarelli

Personal details
- Born: 6 April 1803 Livorno, Grand Duchy of Tuscany
- Died: 2 March 1884 (aged 80) Livorno, Kingdom of Italy

Giovanni Battista Bagalà Blasini (6 April 1803 – 2 March 1884) was a Roman Catholic prelate who served as Bishop of Grosseto (1876–1884).

== Biography ==
Giovanni Battista Bagalà Blasini was born in Livorno. He served as auxiliary bishop of Livorno (1868–1876), for which office he had been appointed titular bishop of Cydonia (Crete). He was transferred to the diocese of Grosseto by Pope Pius IX on 3 April 1876. He died on 1 March 1884.

== Sources ==
- Remigius Ritzler; Pirminus Sefrin (1978). Hierarchia catholica Medii et recentioris aevi (in Latin). Vol. VIII (1846–1903). Il Messaggero di S. Antonio.
- Minucci, Giotto (1988). La città di Grosseto e i suoi vescovi (498-1988) [The city of Grosseto and its bishops (498-1988)]. Florence: Lucio Pugliese. (in Italian)

Catholic Church titles
Preceded by José María de Jesús Yerovi Pintado	Titular bishop of Cydonia; 1868–1876	Succeeded by Francesco Vitagliano
Preceded by Anselmo Fauli	Bishop of Grosseto; 1876–1884	Succeeded by Bernardino Caldaioli
