= Ulisse Carlo Bascherini =

Italian Roman Catholic prelate

Most Reverend Ulisse Carlo Bascherini
- Bishop of Grosseto
- Church: Catholic Church
- Diocese: Diocese of Grosseto
- In office: 1907–1920
- Predecessor: Bernardino Caldaioli
- Successor: Gustavo Matteoni

Orders
- Consecration: 17 August 1907 by Pietro Maffi

Personal details
- Born: 2 April 1844 Corvaia, Grand Duchy of Tuscany
- Died: 16 May 1933 (aged 89) Seravezza, Kingdom of Italy

Ulisse Carlo Bascherini (2 April 1844 – 16 May 1933) was a Roman Catholic prelate who served as Bishop of Grosseto (1907–1920).

== Biography ==
Ulisse Carlo Bascherini was born on 2 April 1844 in Corvaia, a small hamlet near Seravezza, Tuscany.

He was appointed Bishop of Grosseto on 8 July 1907 by Pope Pius X and consecrated on 17 August by cardinal Pietro Maffi. He retired from the diocese on 8 March 1920, and was appointed titular bishop of Amathus in Cyprus by Pope Benedict XV. He died on 16 May 1933.

== Sources ==
- Pięta, Zenon (2002). Hierarchia catholica medii et recentioris aevi (in Latin). Vol. IX (1903–1922). Padua: Messagero di San Antonio. ISBN 978-88-250-1000-8.
- Minucci, Giotto (1988). La città di Grosseto e i suoi vescovi (498-1988) [The city of Grosseto and its bishops (498-1988)]. Florence: Lucio Pugliese. (in Italian)

Catholic Church titles
Preceded by Bernardino Caldaioli	Bishop of Grosseto; 1907–1920	Succeeded by Gustavo Matteoni
Preceded by Henri Maquet	Titular bishop of Amathus in Cyprus; 1920–1933	Succeeded by Georges-Marie-Joseph-Hubert-Ghislain de Jonghe d'Ardoye
