= Andreoccio Ghinucci =

Italian Catholic bishop (died 1497)

The Most Reverend Andreoccio Ghinucci
- Bishop of Grosseto
- Church: Catholic Church
- Appointed: 9 March 1489
- Term ended: 29 June 1497
- Predecessor: Giovanni Pannocchieschi d'Elci
- Successor: Raffaello Petrucci
- Previous post: Bishop of Sovana (1470–1489)

Personal details
- Born: c. 1410s Siena, Republic of Siena
- Died: 29 June 1497

Andreoccio Ghinucci (c. 1410s – 29 June 1497) was an Italian Catholic prelate, papal official, and humanist from Siena. He served as Bishop of Sovana from 1470 to 1489 and as Bishop of Grosseto from 1489 until his death.

Before entering the episcopate, Ghinucci held several civic offices, including appointments as podestà in central Italy, and later entered the Roman Curia as a writer of apostolic letters during the pontificate of Pope Pius II. In 1474, he was also governor of Città di Castello.

He was named Bishop of Sovana by Pope Paul II on 12 November 1470. Ghinucci had sought a transfer from Sovana because of his conflict with Count Niccolò Orsini of Pitigliano, who attempted to secure the bishopric for his brother. With the support of Lorenzo de' Medici, who recommended him to Pope Innocent VIII, he was translated to the see of Grosseto on 9 March 1489. His letter of thanks to Lorenzo is dated 10 February 1489.

== Sources ==
- Cherubin, Paolo (2000). "GHINUCCI, Andreoccio". Dizionario Biografico degli Italiani. Vol. 53. Istituto della Enciclopedia Italiana.
- Eubel, Conradus (1914). Hierarchia catholica medii et recentioris aevi. Vol. 2. Monasterii: Typis Librariae Regensbergianae. pp. 161, 243.
- Pecci, Giovanni Antonio (2013). De Gregorio, Mario; Mazzini, Doriano (eds.). Grosseto città vescovile; da Lo Stato di Siena antico e moderno. Società Bibliografica Toscana. p. 144.
- Ughelli, Ferdinando (1718). Italia Sacra (in Latin). Vol. 3 (2nd ed.). Venice. pp. 690, 757–758.
