= Santa Maria Assunta in Filettole =

Church building in Prato, Italy

Coordinates: 43.89°N 11.13°E

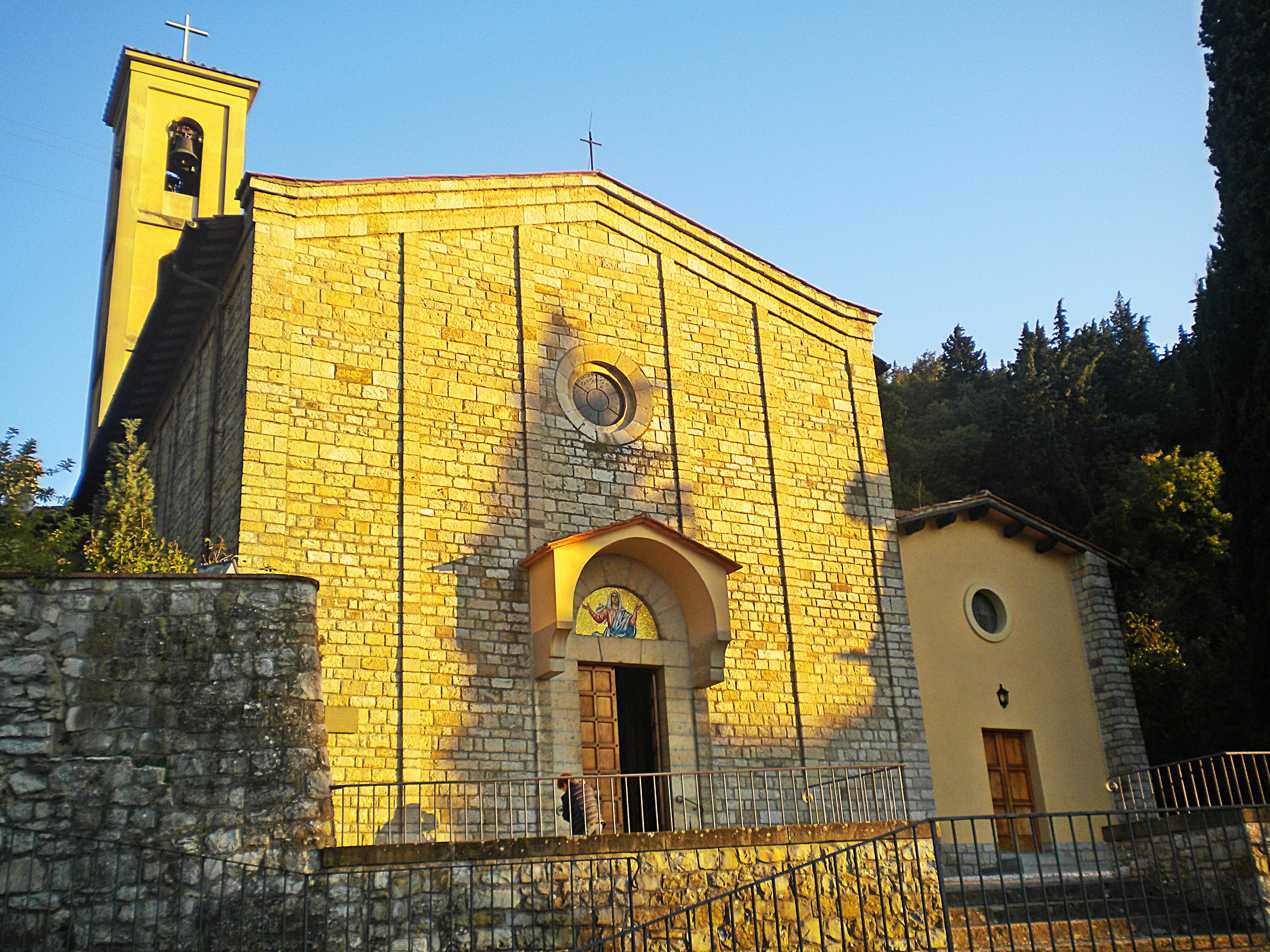
Facade

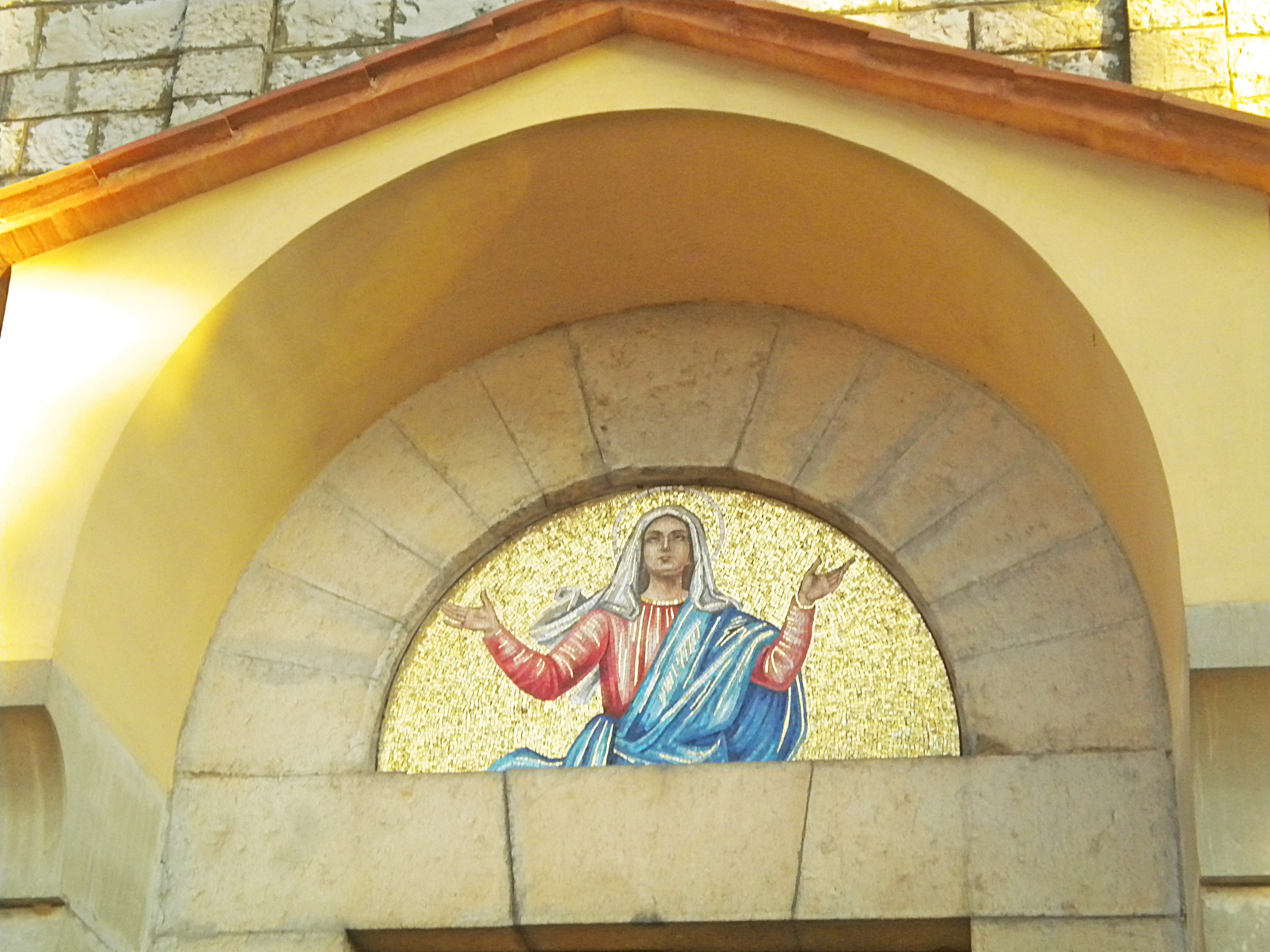
Lunette

The parish church of Santa Maria Assunta in Filettole in the Italian region of Tuscany dates from the eleventh century. It was destroyed in the Second World War and rebuilt in 1958.

== Location ==
The church is at Filettole, a village on the outskirts of Prato. It falls within the diocese of Prato.

== History ==
The parish church has existed since the eleventh century. It was destroyed in Allied aerial bombardments in 1944. The church and bell tower were reconstructed by Sylvester Bardazzi on the basis of photographs taken before the bombing, using materials recovered from the ruins; the building was reopened in 1958.

== Technical profile ==
=== Original structure ===
The church was characterized by a single nave ending in three apses. The façade was decorated with a pattern of architectural pilasters and arches in the roof eaves. The bell tower was coeval with the church and also repeated the decoration of hanging arches. The masonry of the church consisted of coursed rubble of limestone.

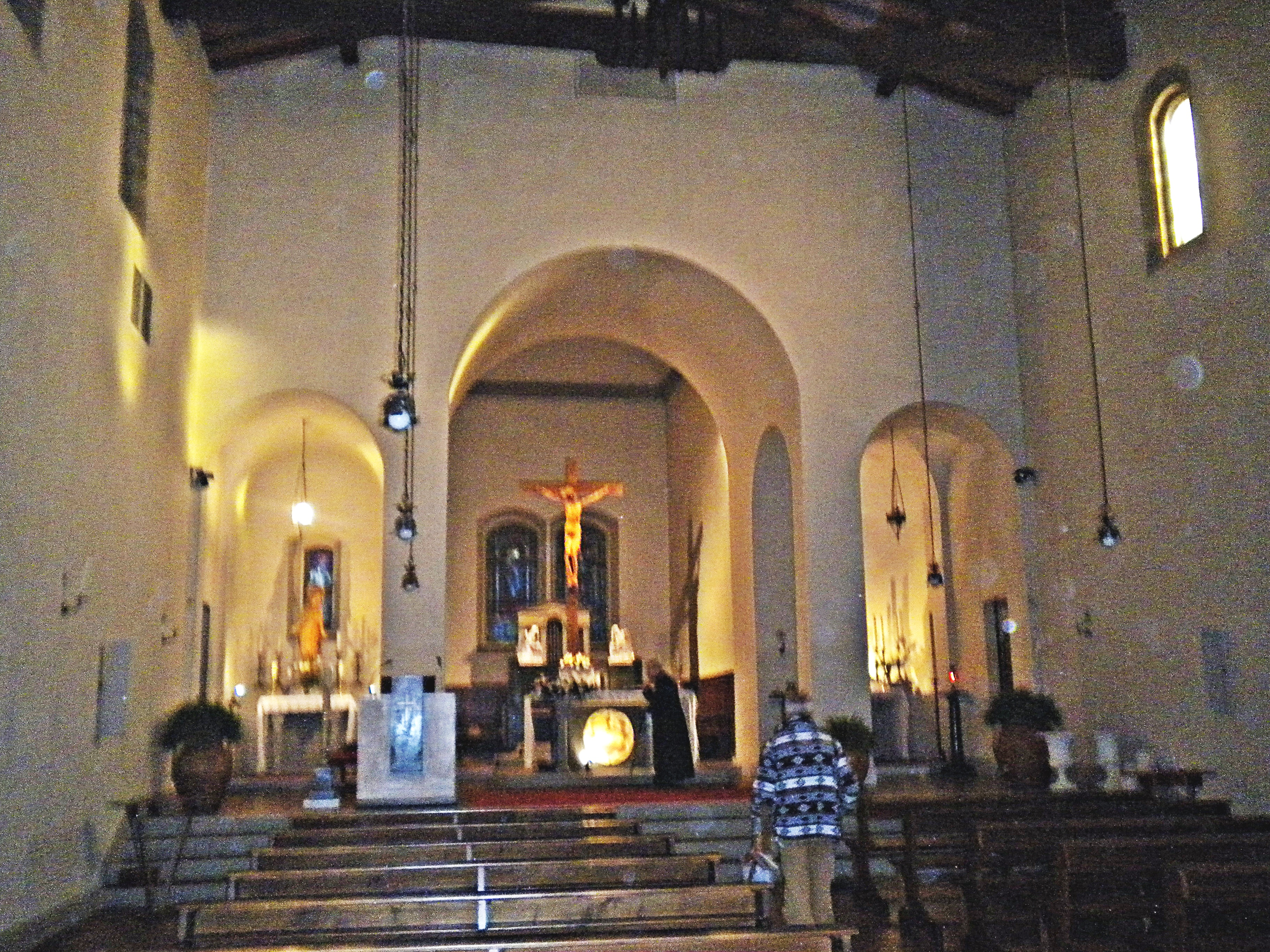
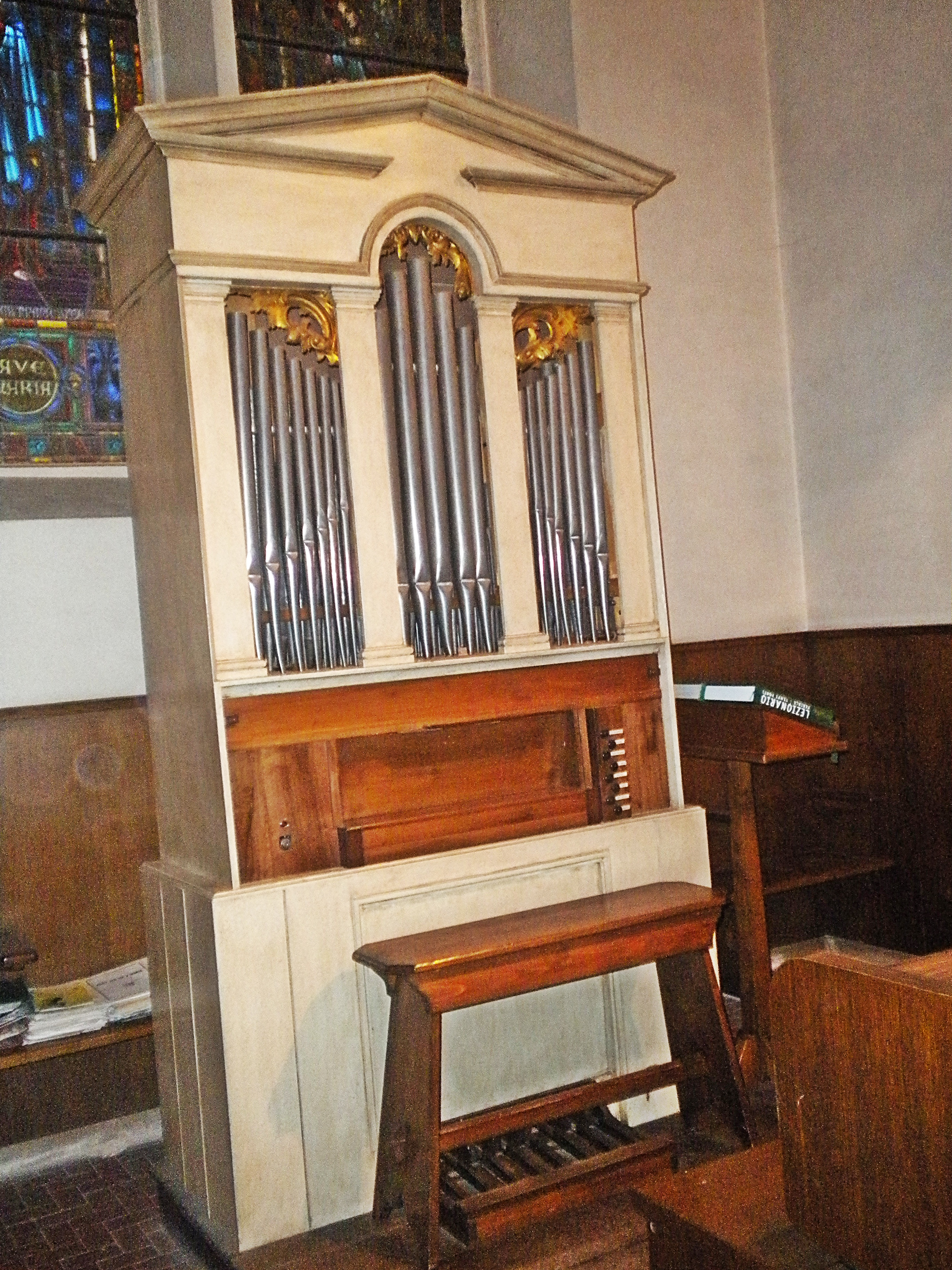
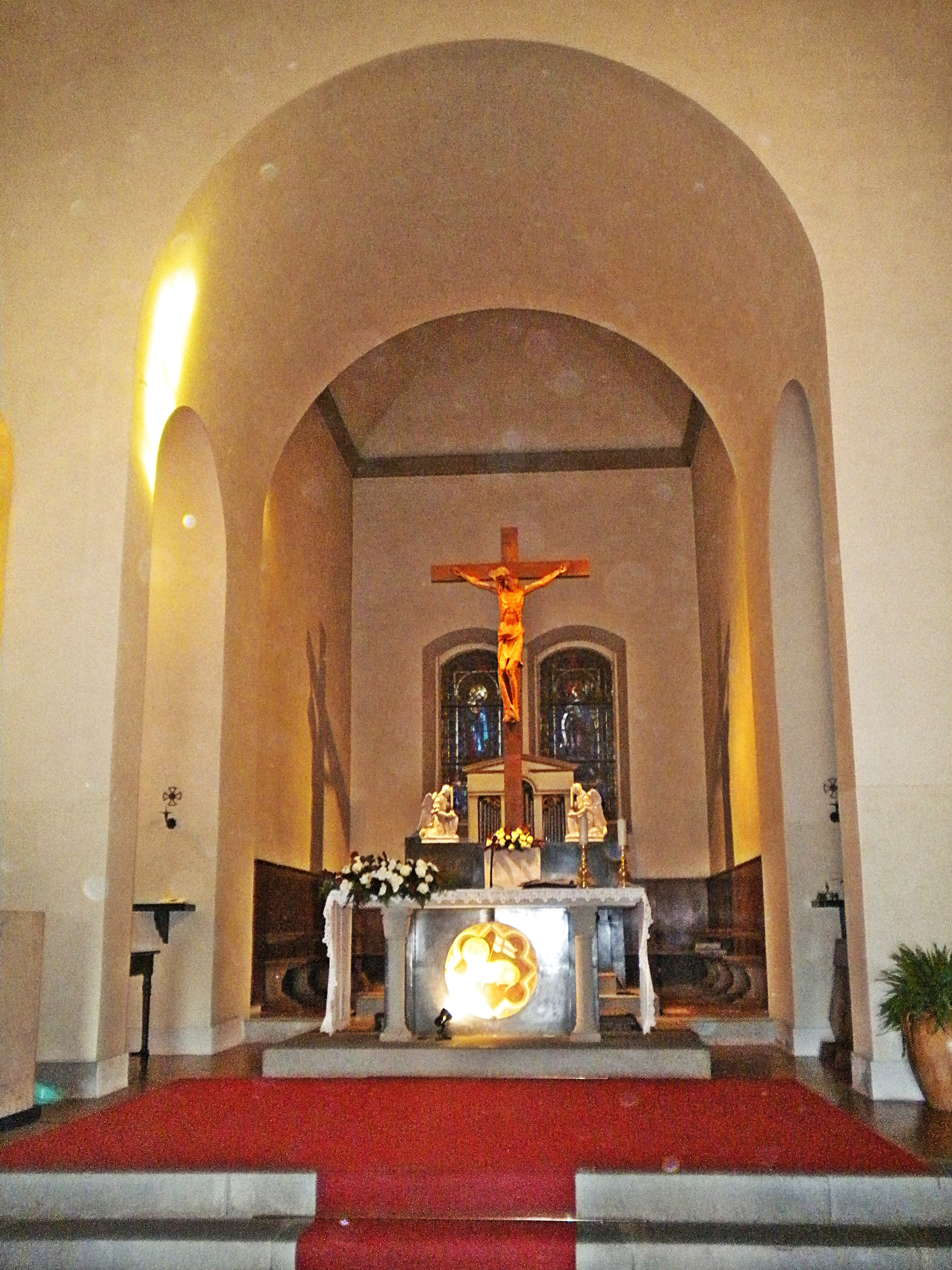
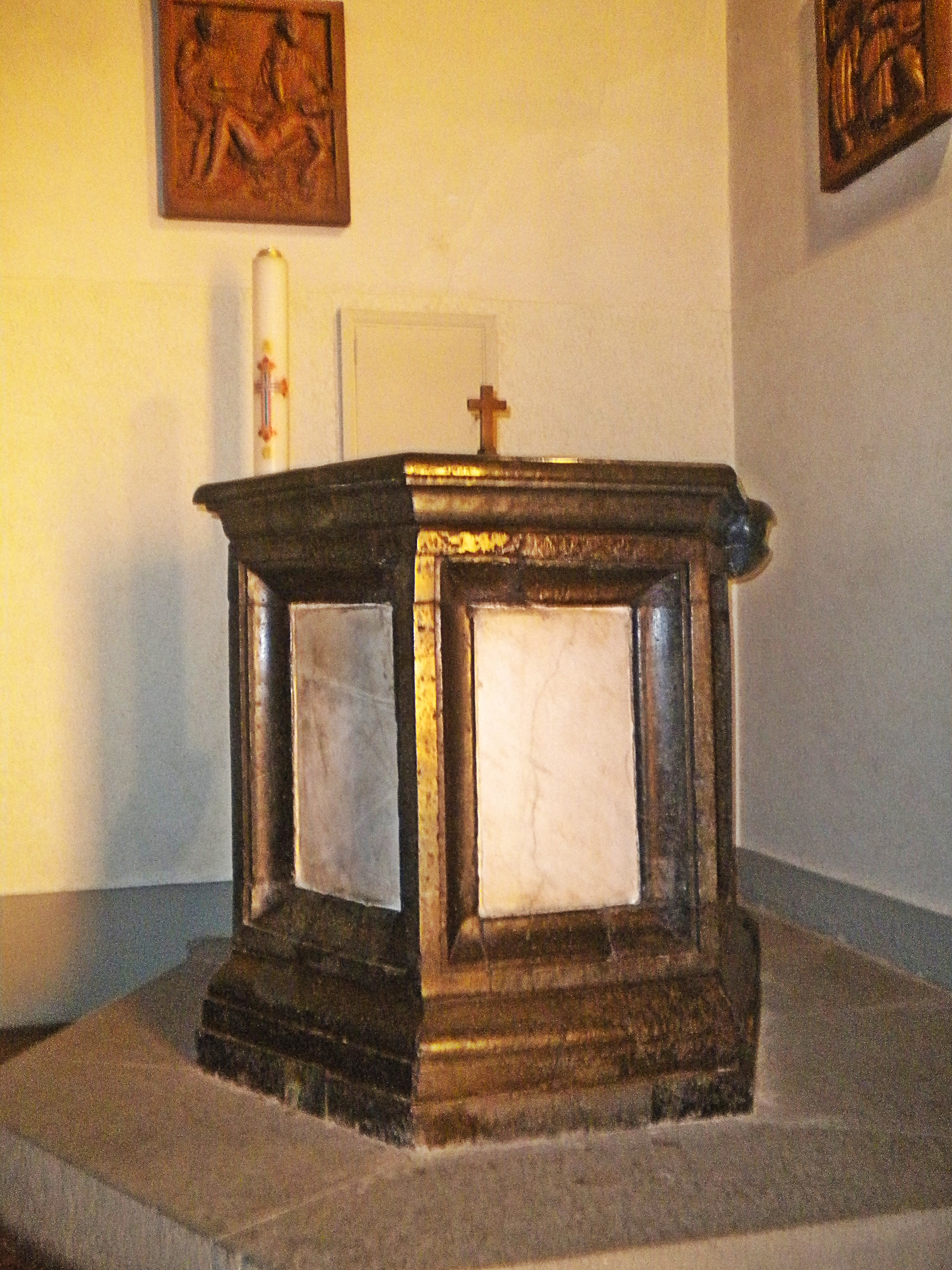

=== Current status ===
The modern church reproduces the ground plan of the ancient building. The façade, in the limestone cornice, is divided by thin pilasters into five bays, not reproducing the previous ornamental arches in the roof eaves. The central bay contains the neomedieval portal with archivolts, over which is a lunette covered with a sort of porch.

The left side - also made of limestone - is marked by four pilasters and pierced with mullioned windows. To the rear stands the bell tower (with a concrete structure), pierced by three orders of mullioned windows.

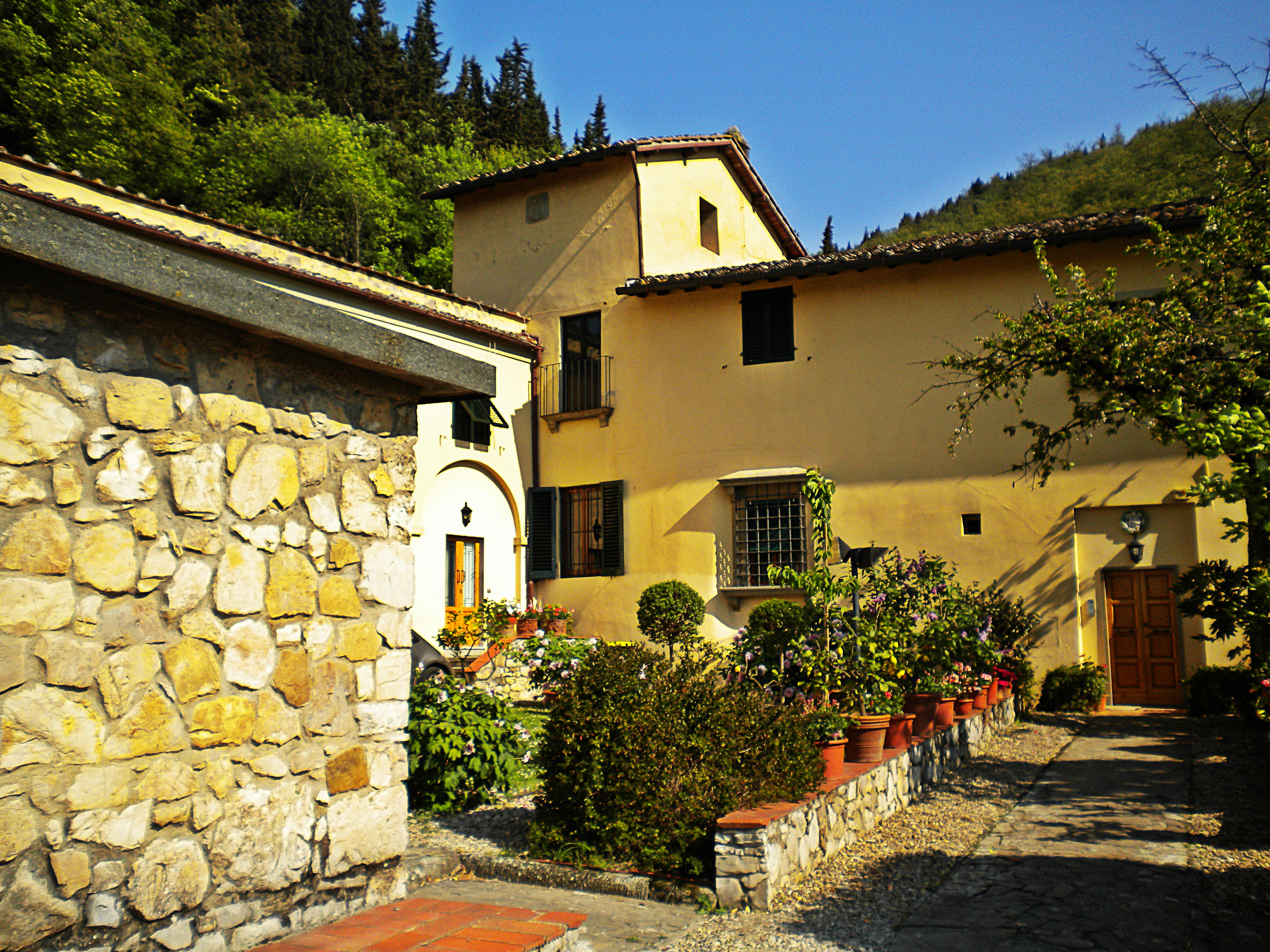
Rectory and garden

== Contents ==
In the church is a marble baptismal font from the fifteenth century, in hexagonal shape, while in the sacristy is a fine wooden crucifix of the fifteenth century by Fr. Romualdo of Candeli.
