= Giacomo Mignanelli =

Bishop of Grosseto, Italy (died 1576)

Most Reverend Giacomo Mignanelli
- Bishop of Grosseto
- Church: Catholic Church
- Diocese: Diocese of Grosseto
- In office: 1553–1576
- Predecessor: Fabio Mignanelli
- Successor: Claudio Borghese

Personal details
- Died: 1576 Grosseto, Grand Duchy of Tuscany

Giacomo Mignanelli (died 1576) was a Roman Catholic prelate who served as Bishop of Grosseto (1553–1576).

== Biography ==
On 2 October 1553, Giacomo Mignanelli was appointed during the papacy of Pope Julius III as Bishop of Grosseto. He served as Bishop of Grosseto until his death in 1576.

== External links and additional sources ==
- Cheney, David M. "Diocese of Grosseto". Catholic-Hierarchy.org. (for Chronology of Bishops) ^{[self-published]}
- Chow, Gabriel. "Diocese of Grosseto (Italy)". GCatholic.org. (for Chronology of Bishops) ^{[self-published]}

Catholic Church titles
Preceded by Fabio Mignanelli	Bishop of Grosseto; 1553–1576	Succeeded by Claudio Borghese
