= Gastone Simoni =

Italian Catholic prelate (1937–2022)

His Excellency, The Most Reverend Gastone Simoni
- Bishop of Prato
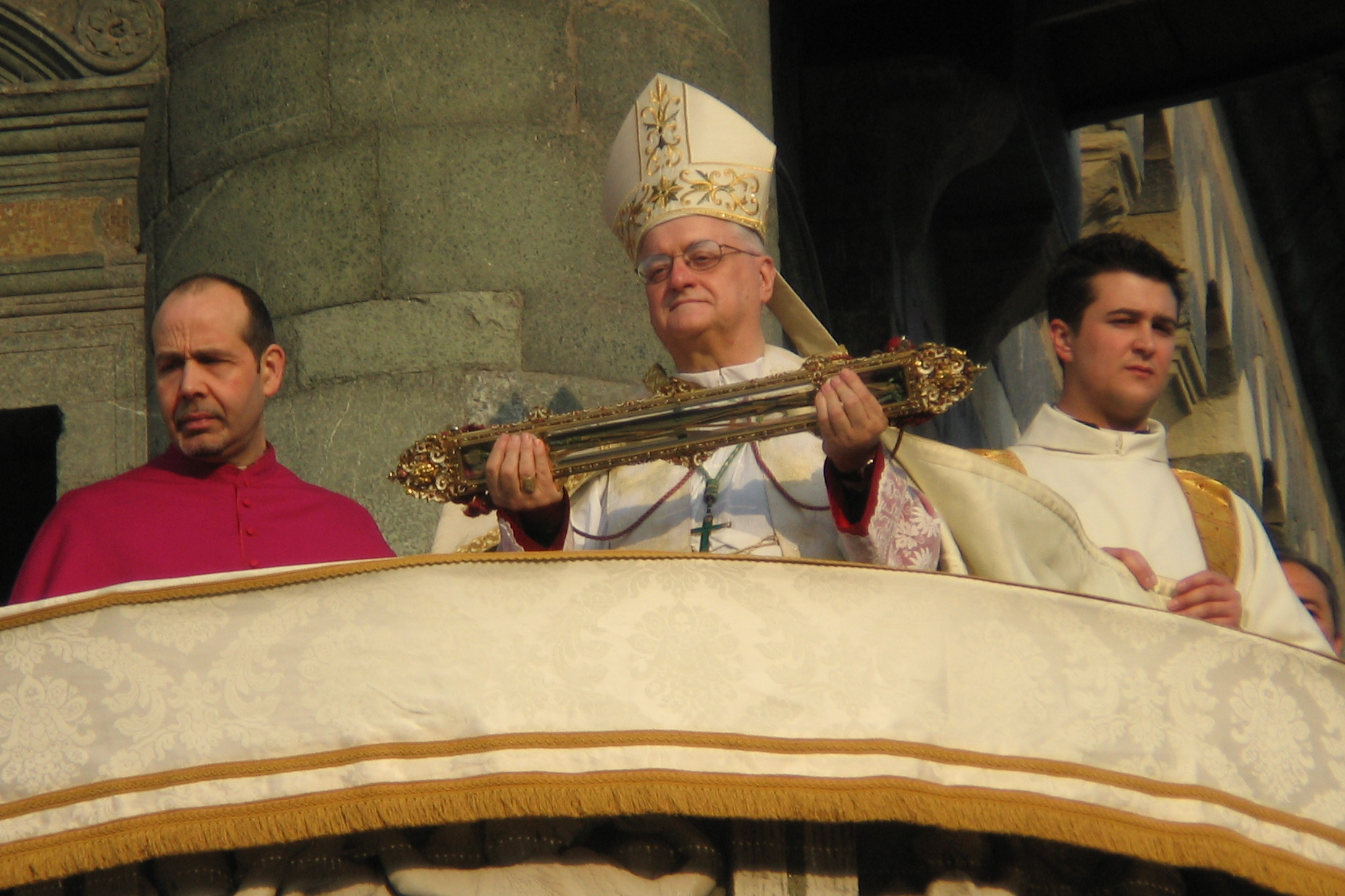
- Simoni presents Girdle of Thomas at Prato Cathedral
- Archdiocese: Florence
- Diocese: Prato
- Appointed: 7 December 1991
- Term ended: 29 September 2012
- Predecessor: Pietro Fiordelli
- Successor: Franco Agostinelli
- Other post: Bishop Emeritus of Prato (2012–2022)

Personal details
- Born: 9 April 1937 Castelfranco di Sopra, Italy
- Died: 28 August 2022 (aged 85) Fiesole, Italy
- Education: Small Diocesan Seminary of Strada, Casentino; Seminary of Fiesole; Pontifical Gregorian University, philosophy
- Motto: Secundum Verbum Tuum (According To Your Word)
- Coat of arms: Gastone Simoni's coat of arms

Ordination history
History
Priestly ordination
- Ordained by: Antonio Bagnoli
Episcopal consecration
- Principal consecrator: John Paul II
- Co-consecrators: Giovanni Battista Re, Giuseppe Uhac

Styles of Gastone Simoni
- Reference style: His Excellency; The Most Reverend
- Spoken style: Your Excellency
- Religious style: Bishop

Gastone Simoni (9 April 1937 – 28 August 2022) was an Italian prelate of the Catholic Church serving as the bishop of Diocese of Prato from 1992 to 2021.

== Biography ==
Simoni was born in Castelfranco di Sopra, in the province of Arezzo, Italy on 9 April 1937. He studied theology at Small Diocesan Seminary of Strada in Casentino and the Seminary of Fiesole. He was ordained to the priesthood in 1960 by the bishop of Fiesole, Antonio Bagnoli.

As a priest, Simoni served as provicar general (1969–1975) and vicar general (1975–1991) for the diocese of Fiesole. He was also rector of the diocesan seminary (1970–1978).

On 7 December 1991 Pope John Paul II appointed Simoni as bishop of the Diocese of Prato, Italy. In January 1992 Simoni was consecrated as a bishop in St. Peter's Basilica by Pope John Paul II. He served as bishop of Prato until his retirement in 2012, after which he became a bishop emeritus.

Simoni died on 28 August 2022. The funeral Mass for Simoni was celebrated at the Prato Cathedral on 31 August.

Catholic Church titles
Preceded by Pietro Fiordelli	Bishop of Prato; 1991–2012	Succeeded by Franco Agostinelli
