= Wolfgang Goler =

Italian Roman Catholic prelate

Most Reverend Wolfgang Goler
- Bishop of Grosseto
- Church: Catholic Church
- Diocese: Diocese of Grosseto
- In office: 1527
- Predecessor: Ferdinando Ponzetti
- Successor: Marco Antonio Campeggi

Personal details
- Died: July 1527 Grosseto, Republic of Siena

Wolfgang Goler (died 1527) was a Roman Catholic prelate who served as Bishop of Grosseto (1527).

== Biography ==
On 25 February 1527, Wolfgang Goler was appointed during the papacy of Pope Clement VII as Bishop of Grosseto. He served as Bishop of Grosseto until his death in July 1527.

== External links and additional sources ==
- Cheney, David M. "Diocese of Grosseto". Catholic-Hierarchy.org. (for Chronology of Bishops) ^{[self-published]}
- Chow, Gabriel. "Diocese of Grosseto (Italy)". GCatholic.org. (for Chronology of Bishops) ^{[self-published]}

Catholic Church titles
Preceded by Ferdinando Ponzetti	Bishop of Grosseto; 1527	Succeeded by Marco Antonio Campeggi
