= Pietro Valentini =

Italian Roman Catholic prelate

Most Reverend Pietro Valentini
- Bishop of Sovana
- Church: Catholic Church
- Diocese: Diocese of Sovana
- In office: 1685–1687
- Predecessor: Pier Maria Bichi
- Successor: Domenico Maria della Ciaja

Orders
- Ordination: 15 June 1647
- Consecration: 23 April 1685 by Alessandro Crescenzi (cardinal)

Personal details
- Born: 6 March 1619 Montalcino, Italy
- Died: 28 November 1687 (age 68) Pitigliano, Italy

Pietro Valentini (6 March 1619 – 28 November 1687) was a Roman Catholic prelate who served as Bishop of Sovana (1685–1687).

== Biography ==
Pietro Valentini was born in Montalcino, Italy on 6 March 1619 and ordained a priest on 15 June 1647. On 9 April 1685, he was appointed Bishop of Sovana by Pope Innocent XI. On 23 April 1685, he was consecrated bishop by Alessandro Crescenzi (cardinal), Cardinal-Priest of Santa Prisca, with Diego Petra, Archbishop of Sorrento, and Pier Antonio Capobianco, Bishop Emeritus of Lacedonia, serving as co-consecrators.

He served as Bishop of Sovana until his death in November 1687.

== External links and additional sources ==
- "Pietro Valentini 1619-1687". Conferenza Episcopale Italiana.
- Cheney, David M. "Diocese of Pitigliano-Sovana-Orbetello". Catholic-Hierarchy.org. (for Chronology of Bishops) ^{[self-published]}
- Chow, Gabriel. "Diocese of Pitigliano-Sovana-Orbetello (Italy)". GCatholic.org. (for Chronology of Bishops) ^{[self-published]}

Catholic Church titles
Preceded by Pier Maria Bichi	Bishop of Sovana; 1685–1687	Succeeded by Domenico Maria della Ciaja
