= Giacomo Babini =

Italian bishop (1929–2021)

- Bishop of Grosseto
- Church: Catholic Church
- Diocese: Diocese of Grosseto
- In office: 13 June 1996 – 17 November 2001
- Predecessor: Angelo Scola
- Successor: Franco Agostinelli
- Previous posts: Bishop of Pitigliano-Sovana-Orbetello (1991-1996); Titular Bishop of Tubunae in Mauretania (1987-1991); Auxiliary Bishop of Arezzo-Cortona-Sansepolcro (1987-1991)

Orders
- Ordination: 26 June 1953 by Pompeo Ghezzi
- Consecration: 19 September 1987 by Giovanni D'Ascenzi

Personal details
- Born: 22 February 1929 Alfero, Verghereto, Province of Forlì-Cesena, Kingdom of Italy
- Died: 1 November 2021 (aged 92) Arezzo, Province of Arezzo, Italy

Giacomo Babini (22 February 1929 – 1 November 2021) was an Italian Roman Catholic prelate. He was bishop of Pitigliano-Sovana-Orbetello from 1991 to 1996 and Grosseto from 1996 to 2001.
