= Giovanni Pecci =

Roman Catholic prelate

- Bishop of Grosseto
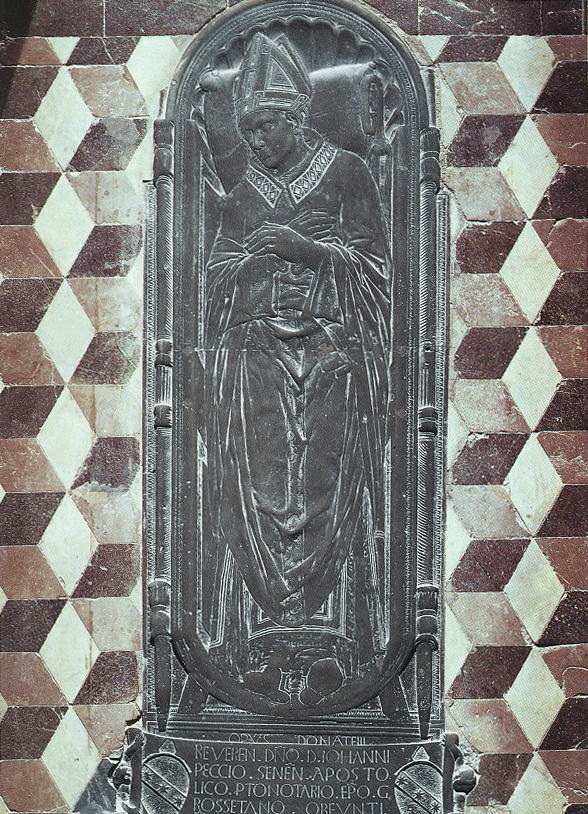
- Tomb of Pecci, by Donatello
- Church: Catholic Church
- Diocese: Diocese of Grosseto
- In office: 1417–1426
- Predecessor: Francesco Bellanti
- Successor: Antonio Casini (administrator)

Personal details
- Born: Siena, Republic of Siena
- Died: 1 March 1426 Siena, Republic of Siena

Giovanni Pecci (d. 1426) was a Roman Catholic prelate who served as canon of the Siena Cathedral and as Bishop of Grosseto (1417–1426).

== Life and career ==
Giovanni Pecci was born in Siena in the second half of the 14th century to Bartolomeo Pecci. He was a Knight Hospitaller, apostolic protonotary, and canon of the Siena Cathedral. As a canon—mentioned in a 1405 consistory—he sought to reform the statutes of the Opera del Duomo, advocating for the reinstatement of canonical representation in the body overseeing the cathedral's artistic direction. His efforts, however, were unsuccessful.

Pecci was appointed bishop of Grosseto on 15 December 1417 and confirmed by Pope Martin V on 1 January 1418. He held the position until his death on 1 March 1426. The episcopal see remained vacant until the appointment of Antonio Casini as apostolic administrator.

Pecci died in his native Siena. His tomb was commissioned from Donatello, who was in the city working on the baptismal font reliefs. The bronze tomb slab is placed in the Siena Cathedral, near the chapel of Sant'Ansano, where it was relocated in 1452 by decision of the Pecci family.
