= Clemente Polito =

Roman Catholic prelate

Most Reverend Clemente Polito
- Bishop of Grosseto
- Church: Catholic Church
- Diocese: Diocese of Grosseto
- In office: 1591–1606
- Predecessor: Claudio Borghese
- Successor: Giulio Sansedoni

Personal details
- Died: 25 October 1606 Grosseto, Grand Duchy of Tuscany

Clemente Polito (died 25 October 1606) was a Roman Catholic prelate who served as Bishop of Grosseto (1591–1606).

== Biography ==
On 26 April 1591, Clemente Polito was appointed during the papacy of Pope Gregory XIV as Bishop of Grosseto. He served as Bishop of Grosseto until his death on 25 October 1606.

== External links and additional sources ==
- Cheney, David M. "Diocese of Grosseto". Catholic-Hierarchy.org. (for Chronology of Bishops) ^{[self-published]}
- Chow, Gabriel. "Diocese of Grosseto (Italy)". GCatholic.org. (for Chronology of Bishops) ^{[self-published]}

Catholic Church titles
Preceded by Claudio Borghese	Bishop of Grosseto; 1591–1606	Succeeded by Giulio Sansedoni
