= Giovanni Nerbini =

Italian prelate of the Catholic Church (born 1954)

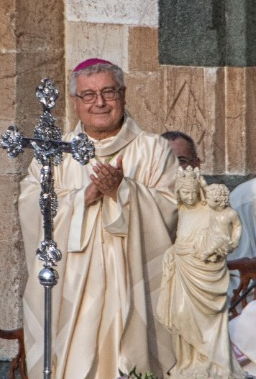
Nerbini, September 2019

Giovanni Nerbini (born 2 June 1954) is an Italian prelate of the Catholic Church who became Bishop of Prato in 2019.

== Biography ==
Giovanni Nerbini was born on 2 June 1954 in Figline Valdarno, Province of Florence. He earned a degree in school supervision and was an elementary schoolteacher from 1973 to 1989. He then entered the seminary of the Diocese of Fiesole and studied philosophy and theology at the Theological Faculty of Central Italy. He was ordained a priest of the Diocese of Fiesole by Bishop Luciano Giovannetti on 22 April 1995 and in that diocese filled a variety of pastoral and administrative assignments. Appointed by Bishop Mario Meini, he was vicar general of the diocese from 2015 to 2018.

On 15 May 2019, Pope Francis named him Bishop of Prato. He received his episcopal consecration from Cardinal Giuseppe Betori, Archbishop of Florence, on 30 June and was installed in Prato on 7 September.

In December 2019, Nerbini notified civil authorities of charges of sexual abuse of two brothers—one less than 14 years old—on the part nine priests and brothers of the Disciples of the Annunciation, an order founded in Prato in 2010 and suppressed by the Vatican's Congregation for Institutes of Consecrated Life and Societies of Apostolic Life on 24 December 2019. His predecessor, Bishop Franco Agostinelli, had only notified Vatican authorities of the allegations and Italian law does not require bishops to notify the police. He is the first Italian bishop to take such an action.
