= Claudio Borghese =

Roman Catholic prelate

Most Reverend Claudio Borghese
- Bishop of Grosseto
- Church: Catholic Church
- Diocese: Diocese of Grosseto
- In office: 1576–1590
- Predecessor: Giacomo Mignanelli
- Successor: Clemente Polito

Personal details
- Died: 1590 Grosseto, Grand Duchy of Tuscany

Claudio Borghese (died 1590) was a Roman Catholic prelate who served as Bishop of Grosseto (1576–1590).

== Biography ==
On 22 August 1576, Claudio Borghese was appointed during the papacy of Pope Gregory XIII as Bishop of Grosseto. He served as Bishop of Grosseto until his death in 1590.

While bishop, he was the principal co-consecrator of: Ascanio I Piccolomini, Coadjutor Archbishop of Siena and Titular Archbishop of Rhodus (1579).

== External links and additional sources ==
- Cheney, David M. "Diocese of Grosseto". Catholic-Hierarchy.org. (for Chronology of Bishops) ^{[self-published]}
- Chow, Gabriel. "Diocese of Grosseto (Italy)". GCatholic.org. (for Chronology of Bishops) ^{[self-published]}

Catholic Church titles
Preceded by Giacomo Mignanelli	Bishop of Grosseto; 1576–1590	Succeeded by Clemente Polito
