= Antonio Maria Franci =

Italian bishop (1705–1790)

His Excellency, The Most Reverend Antonio Maria Franci
- Bishop of Grosseto
- Church: Catholic Church
- Diocese: Diocese of Grosseto
- Appointed: 6 May 1737
- Installed: 28 May 1737
- Term ended: 10 April 1790
- Predecessor: Bernardino Pecci
- Successor: Fabrizio Selvi

Personal details
- Born: 12 July 1705 Batignano, Grand Duchy of Tuscany
- Died: 10 April 1790 (aged 84) Grosseto, Grand Duchy of Tuscany

Antonio Maria Franci (12 July 1705 – 10 April 1790) was an Italian Roman Catholic prelate. He was bishop of Grosseto from 1737 until his death.

== Life and career ==
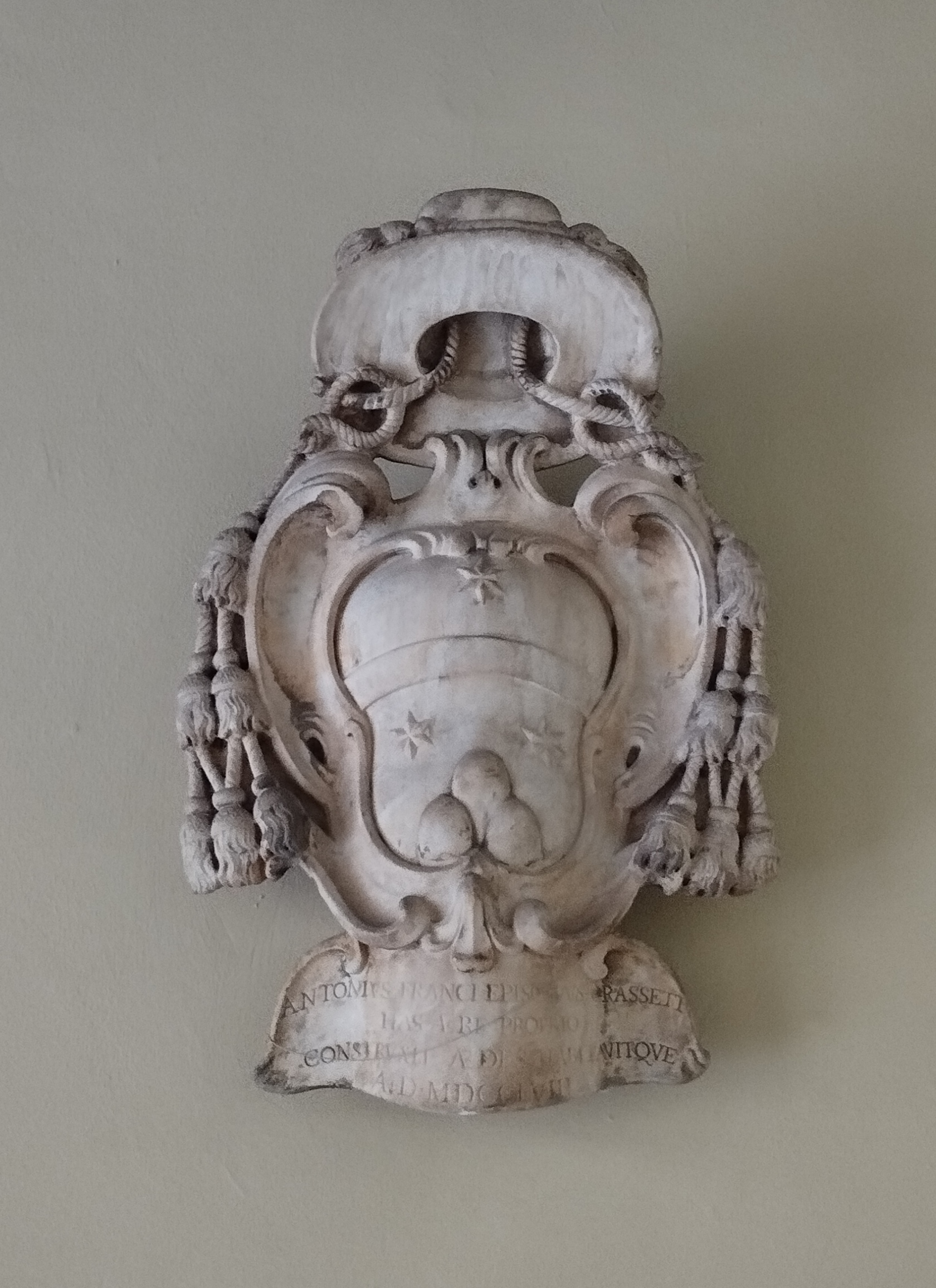
Franci's coat of arms in the Episcopal Palace of Grosseto

Franci was born in Batignano on 12 July 1705. After earning a doctorate in law in Siena in 1729 and becoming a priest, he moved to Naples as a tutor to the Pignatelli family.

In 1737, he was appointed Bishop of Grosseto and focused his episcopacy on patrimonial reorganization, building restorations, and diocesan management. However, he faced numerous challenges stemming from the economic and social underdevelopment of the Maremma region, including a lack of qualified priests. He promoted the establishment of a girls’ school run by the nuns of Santa Chiara and tackled issues related to the ecclesiastical reforms introduced by Peter Leopold, staunchly defending the papacy's authority on ecclesiastical matters.

Franci indirectly participated in the 1787 assembly of Tuscan bishops, often delegating his representatives due to health issues. He died on 10 April 1790, in Grosseto.

== Sources ==
- Bocchini Camaiani, Bruna (1994). "I vescovi toscani nel periodo lorenese" (PDF). Istituzioni e società in Toscana nell'età moderna. Rome: 681–716.
- Fantappiè, Carlo (1998). "FRANCI, Antonio Maria". Dizionario Biografico degli Italiani (in Italian). Vol. 50: Francesco 1. Sforza–Gabbi. Rome: Istituto dell'Enciclopedia Italiana. ISBN 978-88-12-00032-6.
- Giotto Minucci (1988). La città di Grosseto e i suoi vescovi (498-1988). Vol. 2. Florence: Lucio Pugliese.
