= Marco Antonio Campeggi =

16th-century Catholic bishop

Most Reverend Marco Antonio Campeggi
- Bishop of Grosseto
- Church: Catholic Church
- Diocese: Diocese of Grosseto
- In office: 1528–1553
- Predecessor: Wolfgang Goler
- Successor: Fabio Mignanelli

Personal details
- Died: 7 May 1553 Grosseto, Republic of Siena

Marco Antonio Campeggi (died 1553) was a Roman Catholic prelate who served as Bishop of Grosseto (1528–1553).

== Biography ==
On 23 March 1528, Marco Antonio Campeggi was appointed during the papacy of Pope Clement VII as Bishop of Grosseto. He served as Bishop of Grosseto until his death in 7 May 1553.

== Sources ==
- Brizzi, Gian Paolo (1974). "CAMPEGGI, Marco Antonio". Dizionario Biografico degli Italiani. Vol. 17. Enciclopedia italiana Treccani.

Catholic Church titles
Preceded by Wolfgang Goler	Bishop of Grosseto; 1528–1553	Succeeded by Fabio Mignanelli
