= Ascanio Turamini =

Italian Roman Catholic prelate

Most Reverend Ascanio Turamini
- Bishop of Grosseto
- Church: Catholic Church
- Diocese: Diocese of Grosseto
- In office: 1586–1647
- Predecessor: Girolamo Tantucci
- Successor: Giovanni Battista Gori Pannilini

Orders
- Ordination: 19 December 1635
- Consecration: 15 March 1637 by Francesco Maria Brancaccio

Personal details
- Born: 1586 Siena, Grand Duchy of Tuscany
- Died: 2 September 1647 (age 61) Grosseto, Grand Duchy of Tuscany

Ascanio Turamini (1586 – 2 September 1647) was a Roman Catholic prelate who served as Bishop of Grosseto (1586–1647).

== Biography ==
Ascanio Turamini was born in Siena, Italy, in 1586 and ordained a priest on 19 December 1635. On 2 March 1637, he was appointed during the papacy of Pope Urban VIII as Bishop of Grosseto. On 15 March 1637, he was consecrated bishop by Francesco Maria Brancaccio, Cardinal-Priest of Santi XII Apostoli, with Giovanni Battista Altieri, Bishop Emeritus of Camerino, and Emilio Bonaventura Altieri, Bishop of Camerino, serving as co-consecrators. He served as Bishop of Grosseto until his death on 2 September 1647.

== External links and additional sources ==
- Cheney, David M. "Diocese of Grosseto". Catholic-Hierarchy.org. (for Chronology of Bishops) ^{[self-published]}
- Chow, Gabriel. "Diocese of Grosseto (Italy)". GCatholic.org. (for Chronology of Bishops) ^{[self-published]}

Catholic Church titles
Preceded by Girolamo Tantucci	Bishop of Grosseto; 1586–1647	Succeeded by Giovanni Battista Gori Pannilini
