= Bernardino Caldaioli =

Italian Roman Catholic prelate

Most Reverend Bernardino Caldaioli
- Bishop of Grosseto
- Church: Catholic Church
- Diocese: Diocese of Grosseto
- In office: 1884–1907
- Predecessor: Giovanni Battista Bagalà Blasini
- Successor: Ulisse Carlo Bascherini

Orders
- Ordination: 11 June 1870
- Consecration: 2 March 1884 by Lucido Maria Parocchi

Personal details
- Born: 6 December 1847 Castel del Piano, Grand Duchy of Tuscany
- Died: 27 February 1907 (aged 59) Grosseto, Kingdom of Italy

Bernardino Caldaioli (6 December 1847 – 27 February 1907) was a Roman Catholic prelate who served as Bishop of Grosseto (1884–1907).

== Biography ==
Bernardino Caldaioli was born in Castel del Piano, in Mount Amiata, located east-northeast of Grosseto. He was named titular bishop of Magydus (Turkey) and coadjutor bishop of Grosseto on 9 August 1883 by Pope Leo XIII. He succeeded to the bishopric on the death of bishop Giovanni Battista Bagalà Blasini on 1 March 1884. He died on 27 February 1907 in Grosseto.

== Sources ==
- Remigius Ritzler; Pirminus Sefrin (1978). Hierarchia catholica Medii et recentioris aevi (in Latin). Vol. VIII (1846–1903). Il Messaggero di S. Antonio.
- Minucci, Giotto (1988). La città di Grosseto e i suoi vescovi (498-1988) [The city of Grosseto and its bishops (498-1988)]. Florence: Lucio Pugliese. (in Italian)

Catholic Church titles
Preceded by Juan Francisco Bux y Loras	Titular bishop of Magydus; 1883–1884	Succeeded by Giovanni Cagliero
Preceded by Giovanni Battista Bagalà Blasini	Bishop of Grosseto; 1884–1907	Succeeded by Ulisse Carlo Bascherini
