= Bernardino Giordano =

His Excellency Bernardino Giordano
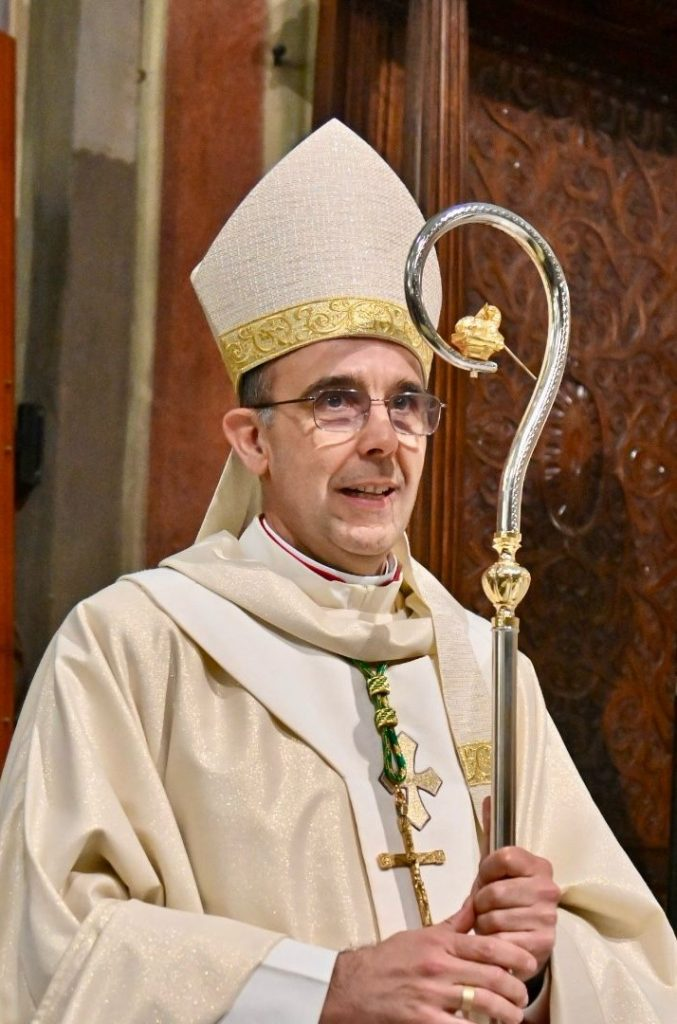
- Giordano in 2025
- Church: Roman Catholic Church
- See: Grosseto and Pitigliano-Sovana-Orbetello
- Appointed: 19 December 2024

Personal details
- Born: 23 March 1979 (age 47) Turin, Italy

Bernardino Giordano (born 23 March 1970) is an Italian Roman Catholic bishop. Since 19 December 2024, he has served as bishop of Grosseto and bishop of Pitigliano-Sovana-Orbetello.

Catholic Church titles
| Preceded by Giovanni Roncari | Bishop of Grosseto; 2024–present | Incumbent |
| Preceded by Giovanni Roncari | Bishop of Pitigliano-Sovana-Orbetello; 2024–present | Incumbent |
