= Franco Agostinelli =

Italian Catholic bishop (born 1944)

His Excellency, The Most Reverend Franco Agostinelli
- Bishop emeritus of Prato
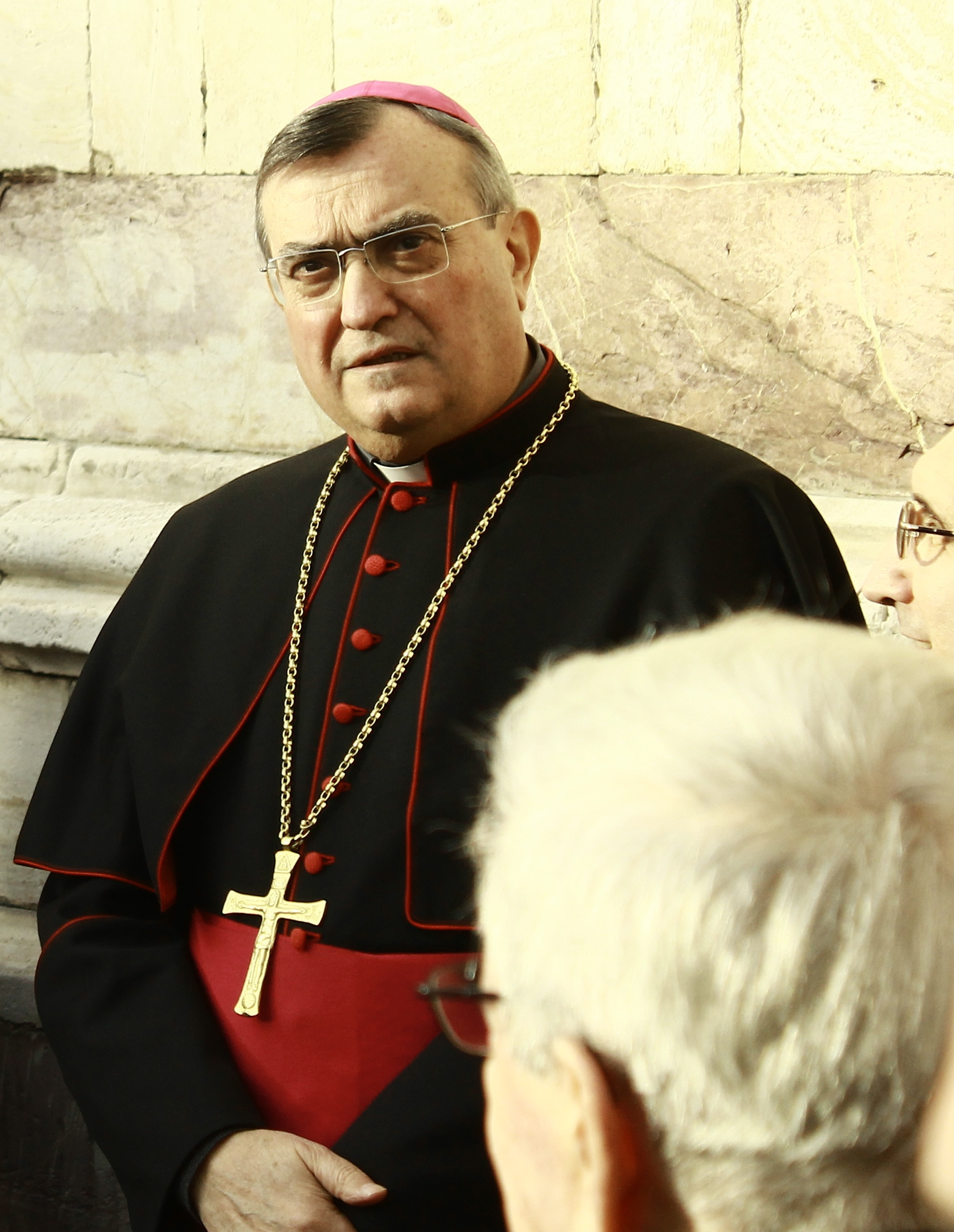
- Church: Catholic Church
- Diocese: Diocese of Prato
- Appointed: 29 September 2012
- Installed: 25 November 2013
- Term ended: 15 May 2019
- Predecessor: Gastone Simoni
- Previous post: Bishop of Grosseto (2001–2012)

Personal details
- Born: 1 January 1944 (age 82) Arezzo, Kingdom of Italy
- Motto: In verbo tuo
- Coat of arms: Franco Agostinelli's coat of arms

Ordination history of Franco Agostinelli
History
Priestly ordination
- Ordained by: Telesforo Giovanni Cioli
Episcopal consecration
- Principal consecrator: John Paul II
- Co-consecrators: Leonardo Sandri; Robert Sarah

Franco Agostinelli (born 1 January 1944) is a retired Italian prelate who served as Bishop of Prato and Bishop of Grosseto.

== Biography ==
Franco Agostinelli was born on 1 January 1944 in Arezzo, a comune in Tuscany, Italy. He was ordained a priest on 9 June 1968 by Telesforo Giovanni Cioli, the Bishop of Arezzo, in the Parish of San Marco alla Sella after studying at the seminary of Arezzo.

After graduating from the Pontifical Lateran University, where he received his licentiate in dogmatic theology in 1970, Agostinelli continued his studies at the Pontifical Alphonsian Academy, where he received a degree in moral theology in 1972. He first served in the Diocese of Arezzo as the vicar coadjutor of the cathedral and then as a parish priest of the Parish of the Sacred Heart. In 1984, he became the episcopal vicar for pastoral care and director of the catechetical office. He served as rector of the diocesan seminary from 1992 to 1994, and in 1997, he was appointed vicar general of the Diocese of Arezzo-Cortona-Sansepolcro and was confirmed in the position in 1999 by the new bishop, Gualtiero Bassetti.

On 17 November 2001, Agostinelli was appointed the Bishop of Grosseto, and received his episcopal consecration from Pope John Paul II on 6 January 2002 in St. Peter's Basilica, with Cardinals Leonardo Sandri and Robert Sarah acting as co-consecrators. On 3 February 2002, he took possession of the Laurentian cathedra, officially taking charge of the diocese.

During a pastoral visit launched in 2007, he came to the attention of the national Italian press. While visiting the quartiere of Barbanella in the city of Grosseto, he visited the local community of Arcigay. Agostinelli maintained that it was his practice to appraise himself of all Catholic and non-Catholic institutions within his diocese. Acrigay interpreted the visit as an endorsement of homosexual relationships by the bishop. At the meeting, Aurelio Mancuso, the national president of Arcigay, was present along with numerous journalists.

Following attention by the media, Agostineli renounced the visit, saying that it had been exploited, and said that he would carry out another visit without any political or media interference. Agostinelli continued to demonstrate openness to dialogue with homosexual communities, meeting with other organizations over the years.

On 29 September 2012, he was appointed the Bishop of Prato by Pope Benedict XVI and was installed in the diocese on 25 November 2013.

Pope Francis accepted his resignation on 15 May 2019.

Catholic Church titles
Preceded by Giacomo Babini	Bishop of Grosseto; 2001–2012	Succeeded by Rodolfo Cetoloni
Preceded by Gastone Simoni	Bishop of Prato; 2012–Present	Incumbent
