= Francesco Piccolomini (bishop of Grosseto) =

Italian Roman Catholic prelate

Most Reverend Francesco Piccolomini
- Bishop of Grosseto
- Church: Catholic Church
- Diocese: Diocese of Grosseto
- In office: 1611–1622
- Predecessor: Giulio Sansedoni
- Successor: Girolamo Tantucci

Orders
- Consecration: 6 November 1611 by Giovanni Garzia Mellini

Personal details
- Died: May 1622 Grosseto, Grand Duchy of Tuscany

Francesco Piccolomini (died 1622) was a Roman Catholic prelate who served as Bishop of Grosseto (1611–1622).

== Biography ==
On 17 August 1611, Francesco Piccolomini was appointed during the papacy of Pope Paul V as Bishop of Grosseto. On 6 November 1611, he was consecrated bishop by Giovanni Garzia Mellini, Cardinal-Priest of Santi Quattro Coronati, with Alessandro Borghi (bishop), Bishop Emeritus of Sansepolcro, and Antonio Maria Franceschini, Bishop of Amelia, serving as co-consecrators. He served as Bishop of Grosseto until his death in May 1622. While bishop, he was the principal co-consecrator of Gregorio Pomodoro, Bishop of Larino (1616) .

== External links and additional sources ==
- Cheney, David M. "Diocese of Grosseto". Catholic-Hierarchy.org. (for Chronology of Bishops) ^{[self-published]}
- Chow, Gabriel. "Diocese of Grosseto (Italy)". GCatholic.org. (for Chronology of Bishops) ^{[self-published]}

Catholic Church titles
Preceded by Giulio Sansedoni	Bishop of Grosseto; 1611–1622	Succeeded by Girolamo Tantucci
