= Gustavo Matteoni =

Italian bishop (1887–1934)

- Archbishop of Siena
- Church: Catholic Church
- Archdiocese: Archdiocese of Siena
- In office: 29 September 1932 – 17 November 1934
- Predecessor: Prospero Scaccia
- Successor: Mario Toccabelli
- Previous posts: Titular Archbishop of Antioch of Pisidia (1932); Coadjutor Archbishop of Siena (1932); Bishop of Sovana and Pitigliano (1924-1932); Bishop of Grosseto (1920-1932)

Orders
- Ordination: c. 1900
- Consecration: 25 March 1920 by Sabbatino Giani

Personal details
- Born: 16 October 1887 Querce (northeast of Fucecchio), Province of Florence, Kingdom of Italy
- Died: 17 November 1934 (aged 47)

Gustavo Matteoni (16 October 1887 – 17 November 1934) was an Italian Roman Catholic prelate who served as bishop of Grosseto (1920–1932), bishop of Sovana-Pitigliano (1924–1934), and archbishop of Siena (1932–1934).

== Sources ==
- Giotto Minucci (1988). La città di Grosseto e i suoi vescovi (498-1988). Vol. 2. Florence: Lucio Pugliese.
