= Diocese of Pitigliano-Sovana-Orbetello =

Roman Catholic diocese in Italy

Coordinates: 42.6344°N 11.6683°E

Diocese of Pitigliano-Sovana-Orbetello Dioecesis Pitilianensis-Soanensis-Urbetelliensis

Catholic
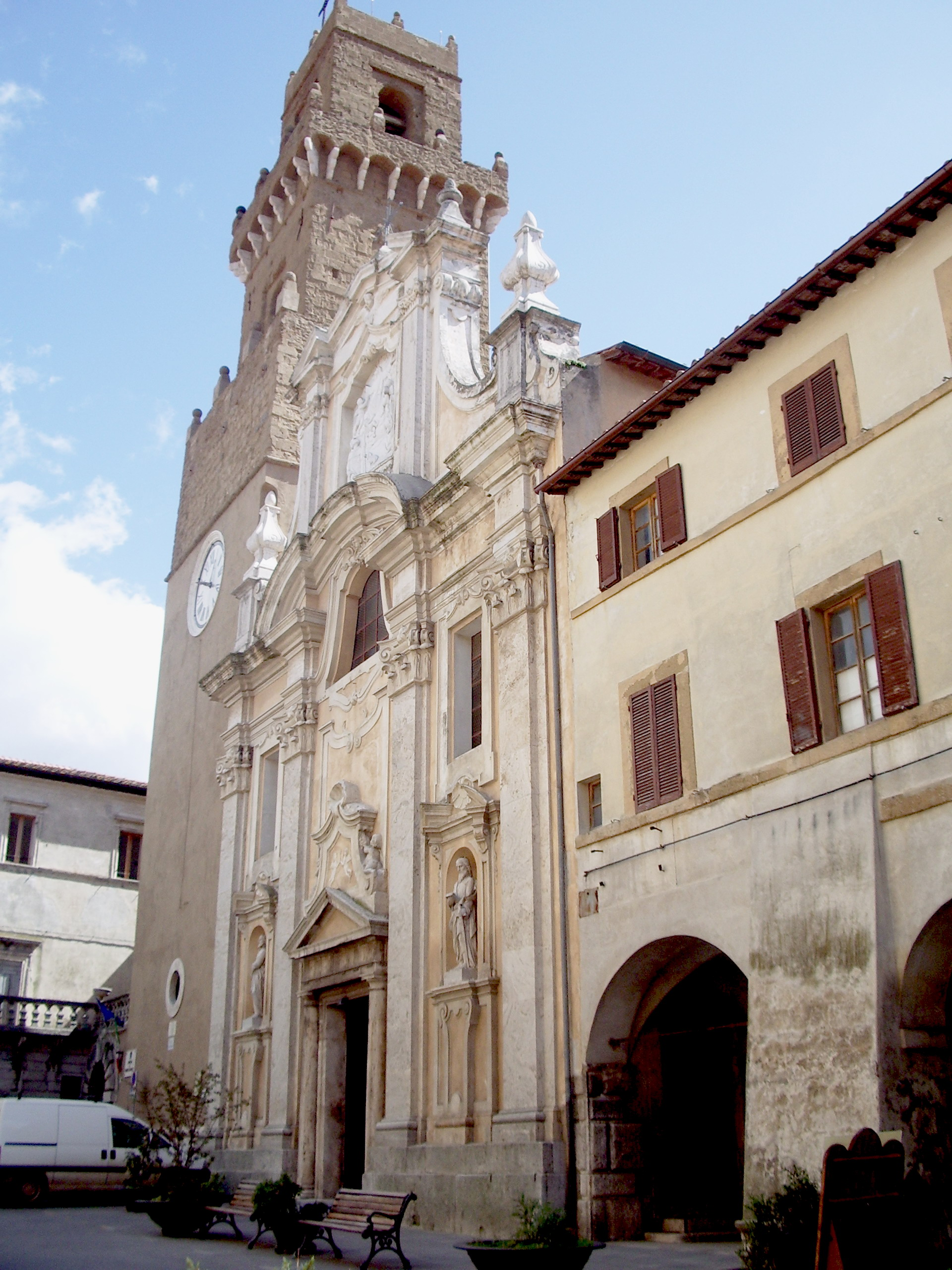
- Pitigliano Cathedral

Location
- Country: Italy
- Ecclesiastical province: Siena-Colle di Val d'Elsa-Montalcino

Statistics
- Area: 2,177 km^{2} (841 sq mi)
- Population: Total; Catholics: (as of 2021); 67,800 (est.); 66,500 (guess)
- Parishes: 71

Information
- Denomination: Catholic Church
- Rite: Roman Rite
- Established: 7th century
- Cathedral: Cattedrale di SS. Pietro e Paolo (Pitigliano)
- Co-cathedral: Concattedrale di S. Maria Assunta (Orbetello); Former cathedral: Former cattedrale di SS. Pietro e Paolo (Sovana)
- Secular priests: 46 (diocesan); 11 (Religious orders); 10 Permanent Deacons

Current leadership
- Pope: Leo XIV
- Bishop: Bernardino Giordano

Map

Website
- www.diocesipitigliano.it

The Diocese of Pitigliano-Sovana-Orbetello (Latin: Dioecesis Pitilianensis-Soanensis-Urbetelliensis) is a Latin Church diocese of the Catholic Church in the ecclesiastical province of the Metropolitan Archdiocese of Siena-Colle di Val d'Elsa-Montalcino, in Tuscany. The diocese of Sovana had originally been directly dependent upon the Holy See, and its bishops attended the pope's synods. When Pope Pius II, who was a Piccolomini of Siena, created the metropolitan archdiocese of Siena, he made Sovana one of its suffragan dioceses. The bishops of Sovana usually resided in the former palace of the Orsini in Pitigliano, which was given to Bishop Francesco Pio Santi (1776–1789) by the Grand Duke of Tuscany.

The bishop has his seat in the Cattedrale di Ss. Pietro e Paolo, dedicated to Saints Peter and Paul, in Pitigliano, a part of the province of Grosseto; the municipality of Sovana (Soana) in Toscana also has a Co-Cathedral named in honour of Saint Peter. Orbetello has the Concattedrale di S. Maria Assunta (S. Biagio), dedicated to the Assumption and St. Biagio.

== History ==
The two towns, Sovana and Pitigliano, are situated in the Province of Grosseto, Central Italy. The Diocese of Sovana, was in existence by 680, and was a suffragan of the Archdiocese of Siena. Sovana was an ancient Etruscan city, and preserved a certain importance till the end of the thirteenth century, having been the capital of the counts of Aldobrandeschi, lords of Southern Tuscany, from the days of Charlemagne.

In 1230 the diocese lost territory which had been given as a gift to Territorial Abbacy of Santi Vincenzo ed Anastasio alle tre Fontane in Rome. In 1240 the city withstood a siege by Emperor Frederick II. Later it passed under the sway of the Orsini family, who transferred their residence to Pitigliano, mentioned for the first time in 1081.

In 1401 the city fell into the power of the Republic of Siena. In 1434, Count Gentile Orsini having been killed at Sovana, the people of Pitigliano put the town to fire and sword, and brought about its destruction.

On 22 April 1459, Pope Pius II issued the bull "Triumphans Pastor", in which he raised the diocese of Siena to metropolitan status, and assigned to it as suffragans the dioceses of Sovana, Chiusi, Massa, and Grosseto.

The territory of this diocese includes the Vallombrosan Abbey of Monte Calvello, which was transferred in 1496 by Pope Alexander VI a new abbey within the city walls.

=== Diocese of Pitigliano ===
On 11 January 1844, Pope Gregory XVI created the diocese of Pitigliano, and assigned it aeque principaliter to the bishop of Sovana. The diocese was renamed as Diocese of Sovana–Pitigliano (Soanensis–Pitilianensis in Latin), and the former collegiate church of Saints Peter and Paul in Pitigliano became the new cathedral.

=== Modern changes ===
The Second Vatican Council, in order to ensure that all Catholics received proper spiritual attention, decreed the reorganization of the diocesan structure of Italy and the consolidation of small and struggling dioceses. It also recommended the abolition of anomalous units such as exempt territorial prelatures. The territorial Abbey of Saints Vincent and Anastasius in suburban Rome was one of them, having been suppressed in 1812, then handed over to the Friars Minor in 1825, though malaria drove them out; in 1867, the Cistercians took over the abbey with a contingent of Trappist friars. The widely dispersed properties which belonged to the abbey and the Catholics living on them had come to be neglected. After extensive consultation, therefore, Pope John Paul II issued the apostolic constitution Abbatia SS. Vincentii on 25 March 1981, which reassigned various territories of the abbey to the dioceses in which they were situated. Properties in Tuscany at Orbetello, Monte Argentario, Giglio Island, and Capalbio, along with the parishes established in them, as well as oratories, chapels, cemeteries, and all other ecclesiastical goods, were assigned to the diocese of Sovana-Pitigliano. The diocese's name was changed to Diocese of Sovana–Pitigliano–Orbetello.

On 30 September 1986, the diocese was renamed Diocese of Pitigliano–Sovana–Orbetello (Pitilianensis–Soanensis–Urbetelliensis in Latin), taking into account regulations that favoured the larger and more important city.

=== Chapter and cathedral ===
The cathedral of Pitigliano began as a simple parish church, dedicated to S. Mark the Evangelist. In 1509, Pope Julius II raised the parish church to the dignity of a collegiate church, dedicated to St. Peter and Paul. It was administered by a Chapter, composed of an Archpriest and eight Canons.

In 1669, the Chapter of the cathedral of S. Pietro in Sovana had one dignity and three Canons. Ughelli (1725) notes that there were two dignities (the Provost and the Dean) and three Canons. There were two parishes in the city of some 400 persons, one of which was the cathedral, whose Provost had the care of the souls of the parishioners.

=== Synods ===
A diocesan synod was an irregularly held, but important, meeting of the bishop of a diocese and his clergy. Its purpose was (1) to proclaim generally the various decrees already issued by the bishop; (2) to discuss and ratify measures on which the bishop chose to consult with his clergy; (3) to publish statutes and decrees of the diocesan synod, of the provincial synod, and of the Holy See.

The first synod held in the diocese of Sovana following the decrees of the Council of Trent on the regular holding of synods took place on 2 May 1601, under the direction of Bishop Metello Bichi (1596–1606).

Bishop Ottavio Saraceni (1606–1623) held a synod in Sovana on 1 June 1620. In 1626, Bishop Scipione Tancredi (1624–1637) presided over a diocesan synod. On 9 May 1630, he presided over his fifth diocesan synod. Bishop Enea di Cesare Spennazzi (1638–1644) held a diocesan synod in Sovana in 1639. On 15 October 1682, Bishop Pier Maria Bichi, O.S.B. (1673–1684) convened a diocesan synod in Pitigliano. A diocesan synod was held by Bishop Domenico Maria della Ciaja, O.P. (1688–1713) on 9 May 1690 in Sovana; on 20 April 1693 in Scansano; on 15 May 1696 in Pitigliano; on 22 May 1703 in Pitigliano; and on 3–4 May 1706 in Pitigliano; he held his sixth synod in Pitigliano on 13 May 1709.

Bishop Cristoforo Palmieri (1728–1739) held a diocesan synod in Soana on 16–17 June 1732. Bishop Tiberio Borghesi (1762–1772) presided over a diocesan synod in 1768.

On 23–24 September 1936, Bishop Stanislao Battistelli (1932–1952) presided over a diocesan synod in Pitigliano, in the episcopal palace. He celebrated another synod in July 1946, which constituted the occasion on which Pope Pius XII declared Pope Gregory VII the co-patron of the diocese.

== Bishops ==
=== Bishops of Sovana ===
==== to 1300 ====
- Mauritius (attested 680)

...

- Vestianus (attested 826)

...

- Tanimundus (attested 853)
- Rastaldus (attested 861)
- Stephanus (attested 869, 886)

...

- Rainerius (attested 967)
- Joannes (attested 1027–1059)
- Anselmus (attested 1061)
- P[––]

...
[David]
...

- Eugerius

...

- Ildito (attested 1126, 1147)
- Petrus (c.1153–c.1175)
- Paulinus (c.1175–1193?)

...

- Bernardus

...

- Jordanus (attested 1193–1197)

...

- Vivianus (attested 1206)

...

- Gualtierinus (attested 1221, 1227)
- Theodinus (1260? – death 1270)

...

- Davide Bandini, O.Cist. (1272–1283)
- Moricus (1283–c. 1293)
- Lando (1294–1298)
- Monaldo Monaldeschi, O. Min. (1298.05.07 – 1302.12)

==== 1300 to 1600 ====
- Zampo (1302–1312)
- Trasmundus Monaldeschi, O.P. (1312–1330?)
- Alamanno Donati, O.F.M. (1330–1342)
- Niccolò Bernardi, O.Carm. (1342–1362 ?)
- Paolo Neri Bessi, O.E.S.A. (1360?–1367)
- Niccolò da Nola, O.F.M. (1368)
- Roberto de Rainaldo (1369 – 1380?)
- Pier Nicolò Blandibelli (1380–1386?) Roman Obedience
- Antonio, O.S.B.Cam. (1386–1390) Roman Obedience
- Tommaso de Mari (1390–1397)
- Valentino Vanni (1397–1399 ?)
- Domenico de Sora, O.Min. (1399–1400)
- Pietro, O.S.B. (1402– death 1467.09)
- Antonio del Fede, O. Carm. (1418–1433)
- Gioacchino (1434–1439)
- Apollonio Massaini (1439–1467)
- Tommaso della Testa Piccolomini (1467–1470)
- Andreoccio Ghinucci (1470–1489)
- Girolamo Scotti (1489–1492)
- Adello Piccolomini (1492–1510)
- Alfonso Petrucci (1510–1513)
- Lattanzio Petrucci (1513–1517) first reign
- Domenico Collesta (1517–1520)

Cardinal Raffaello Petrucci (1520–1522) Apostolic Administrator

- Lattanzio Petrucci (1522–1527) reinstated

Sede vacante (1527–1529)
Cardinal Ercole Gonzaga (1529–1532) Apostolic Administrator
Cardinal Alessandro Farnese (1532) Apostolic Administrator

- Ferdinando Farnese (1532–1535)
- Carvajal Simoncelli (1535–1596)
- Metello Bichi (1596–1606 resigned)

==== 1600 to 1861 ====
- Ottavio Saraceni (1606–1623)
- Scipione Tancredi (1624–1637)
- Christophe Tolomei (1637–1638?)
- Enea di Cesare Spennazzi (1638–1644)
- Marcello Cervini (1645–1652)
- Girolamo Borghese, O.S.B. (1652–1668)
- Girolamo Cori (de Coris) (1669–1672)
- Pier Maria Bichi, O.S.B. (1673–1684)
- Pietro Valentini (9 April 1685 –Sep 1687)
- Domenico Maria della Ciaja, O.P. (14 June 1688 – 23 Jan 1713 Died)
- Fulvio Salvi (1713–1727)
- Cristoforo Palmieri (8 March 1728 – 26 March 1739)
- Antonio Vegni (16 Nov 1739 – 15 August 1744)
- Nicolaus (Arcangelo) Bianchini, O.C.D. (28 Nov 1746 – 22 May 1750)
- Segherio Felice Seghieri (19 Jul 1751 – 27 July 1758)
- Tiberio Borghesi (29 March 1762 –1772)
- Gregorio Alessandri (14 June 1773 –1776)
- Francesco Pio Santi (16 Sep 1776 – 16 August 1789)
- Filippo Ghighi (20 Sep 1802 – 10 Jan 1830)
- Giacomo Bellucci (1831)
- Francesco Maria Barzellotti (1832–1861)

Sede vacante (1861–1871)

=== Bishops of Sovana and Pitigliano ===
- Antonio Sbrolli (1871–1885 Resigned)
- Giulio Matteoli (11 Feb 1889 – 22 June 1896 Appointed, Bishop of Pescia)
- Michele Cardella, (C.P.) (30 Nov 1896 – 6 Feb 1916)
- Riccardo Carlesi (8 July 1916 –1923)
- Gustavo Matteoni (1924–1932)
- Stanislao Amilcare Battistelli, C.P. (24 June 1932 – 14 Feb 1952 Appointed, Bishop of Teramo e Atri)
- Pacifico Giulio Vanni, O.F.M. (10 May 1952 – 13 July 1963 Resigned)
- Luigi Pirelli (14 August 1963 – 14 August 1964 Died)
- Giovanni D’Ascenzi (7 Oct 1975 – 11 April 1983 Appointed, Bishop of Arezzo)
  - Auxiliary Bishop: Renato Spallanzani (1967 – 1970.04.23)
  - Auxiliary Bishop: Adelmo Tacconi (1970.04.23 – 1975)

=== Bishops of Sovana-Pitigliano-Orbetello ===
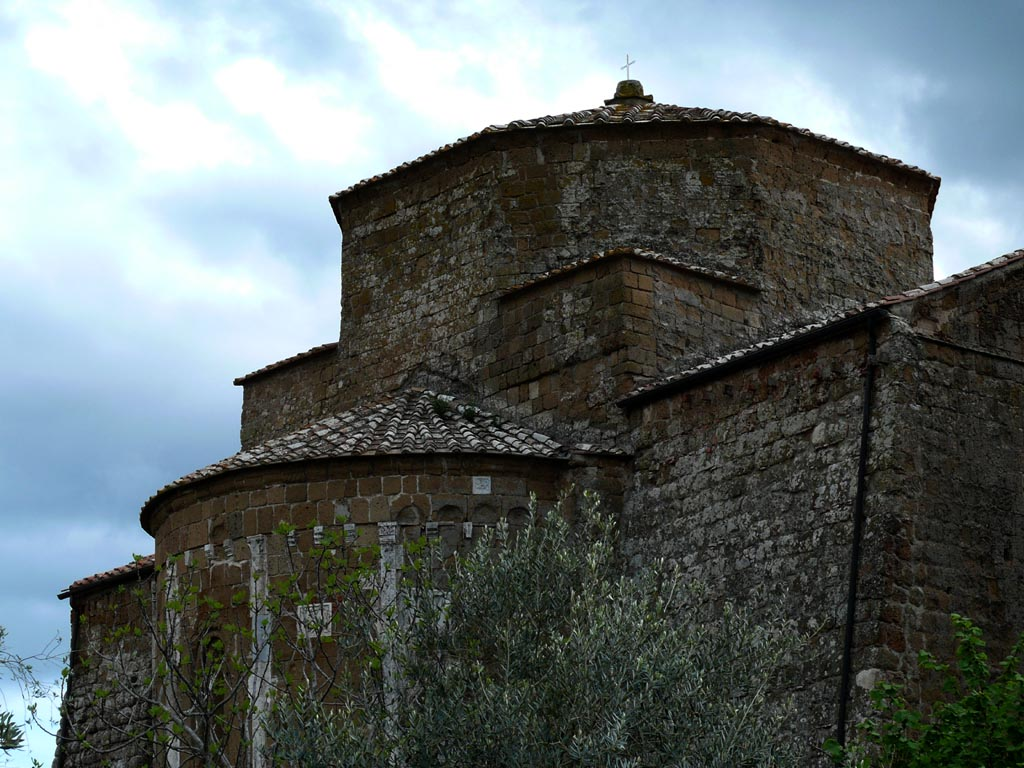
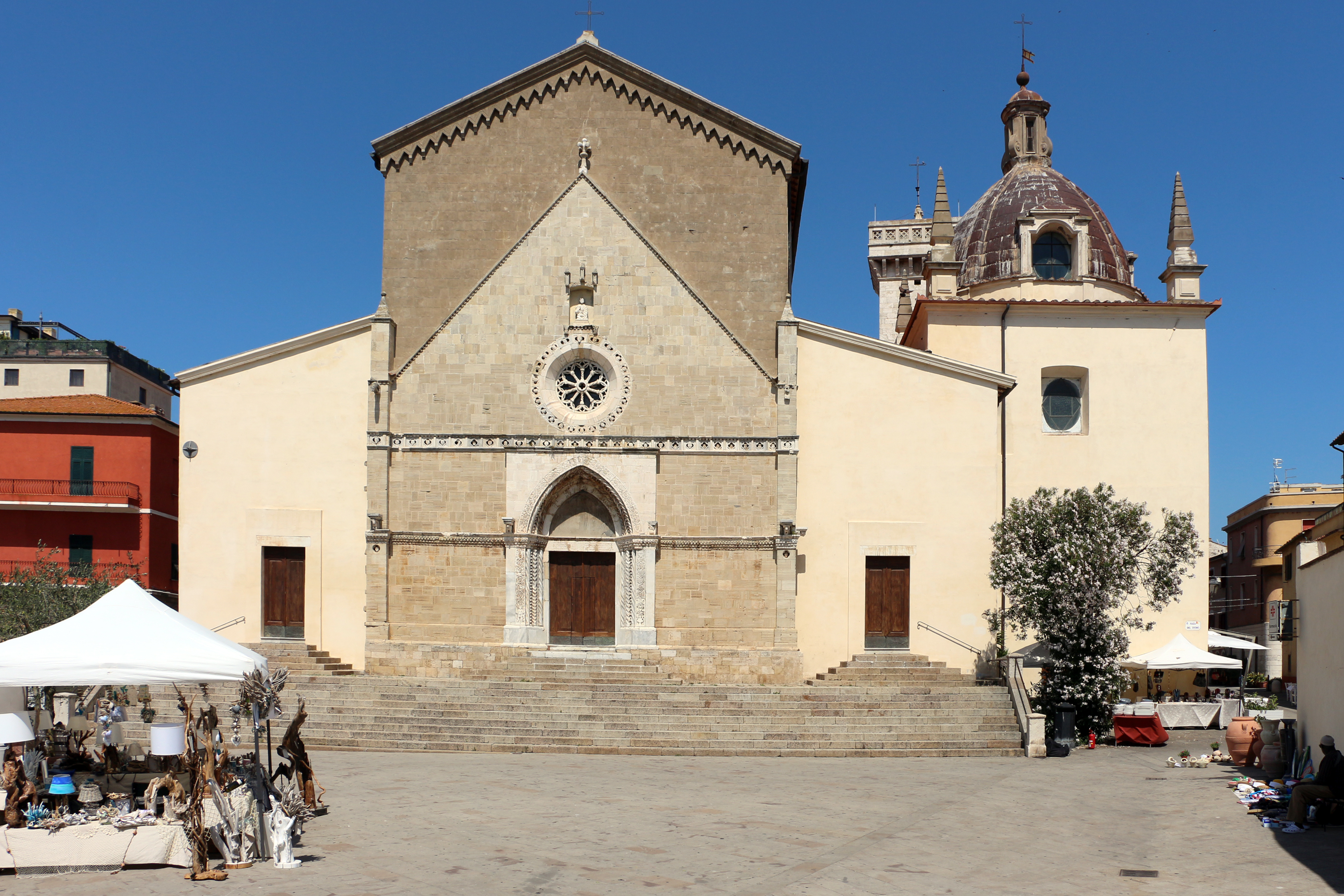
former cathedral in Sovana (left) Co-cathedral in Orbetello (right)

Name Changed: 25 March 1981
Latin Name: Soanensis-Pitilianensis-Urbetelliensis

- Eugenio Binini (3 Dec 1983 – 20 July 1991 Appointed, Bishop of Massa Carrara-Pontremoli)
- Giacomo Babini (7 Dec 1991 – 13 July 1996 Appointed, Bishop of Grosseto)
- Mario Meini (13 July 1996 – 13 Feb 2010 Appointed, Bishop of Fiesole)
- Guglielmo Borghetti (25 June 2010 – 10 Jan 2015 Appointed, Coadjutor Bishop of Albenga-Imperia)
- Giovanni Roncari, O.F.M. Cap. (1 Oct 2015 – ... )

== See also ==
- List of Catholic dioceses in Italy

== Books ==
- Gams, Pius Bonifatius (1873). Series episcoporum Ecclesiae catholicae: quotquot innotuerunt a beato Petro apostolo. Ratisbon: Typis et Sumptibus Georgii Josephi Manz. pp. 756–757. (Use with caution; obsolete)
- Eubel, Conradus, ed. (1913). Hierarchia catholica (in Latin). Vol. Tomus 1 (second ed.). Münster: Libreria Regensbergiana.
- Eubel, Conradus, ed. (1914). Hierarchia catholica (in Latin). Vol. Tomus 2 (second ed.). Münster: Libreria Regensbergiana.
- Eubel, Conradus; Gulik, Guilelmus, eds. (1923). Hierarchia catholica (in Latin). Vol. Tomus 3 (second ed.). Münster: Libreria Regensbergiana.
- Gauchat, Patritius (1935). Hierarchia catholica (in Latin). Vol. Tomus IV (1592-1667). Münster: Libraria Regensbergiana.
- Ritzler, Remigius; Sefrin, Pirminus (1952). Hierarchia catholica medii et recentis aevi (in Latin). Vol. Tomus V (1667-1730). Patavii: Messagero di S. Antonio.
- Ritzler, Remigius; Sefrin, Pirminus (1958). Hierarchia catholica medii et recentis aevi. Vol. Tomus VI (1730-1799). Patavii: Messagero di S. Antonio.
- Ritzler, Remigius; Sefrin, Pirminus (1968). Hierarchia Catholica medii et recentioris aevi (in Latin). Vol. VII (1800–1846). Monasterii: Libreria Regensburgiana.
- Remigius Ritzler; Pirminus Sefrin (1978). Hierarchia catholica Medii et recentioris aevi (in Latin). Vol. VIII (1846–1903). Il Messaggero di S. Antonio.
- Pięta, Zenon (2002). Hierarchia catholica medii et recentioris aevi (in Latin). Vol. IX (1903–1922). Padua: Messagero di San Antonio. ISBN 978-88-250-1000-8.

=== Studies ===
- Bruscalupi, Giuseppe (1906). Monografia storica della contea di Pitigliano (in Italian). Firenze: Martini, Servi e c.
- Cappelletti, Giuseppe (1862). Le chiese d'Italia dalla loro origine sino ai nostri giorni (in Italian). Vol. decimosettimo. Venezia: Antonelli. pp. 727–755.
- Corridori, Ippolito (2004). La diocesi di Pitigliano Sovana Orbetella nella storia. Le Comunità parrochiali. Dalle origini ai nostri giorni. Fondi: Tipografia Grafiche PD Fondi. (in Italian)
- Corridori, Ippolito (2011). "I sinodi nella storia della diocesi,"; retrieved: 1 January 2020. (in Italian)
- Greco, Gaetano (1994). "I vescovi del Granducato di Toscana nell'età medicea". In: Istituzioni e società in Toscana nell'età moderna. Rome 1994. pp. 655–680. (in Italian)
- Kehr, Paul Fridolin (1908). Italia pontificia. vol. III. Berlin 1908. pp. 252–257. (in Latin)
- Lanzoni, Francesco (1927). Le diocesi d'Italia dalle origini al principio del secolo VII (an. 604). Faenza: F. Lega. pp. 552–554.(in Italian)
- Polock, Marlene (1990). "Der Prozess von 1194 zwischen Orvieto und Sovana um das Val di Lago. Mit Edition der Akten und der Bischofsliste von Sovana bis zum Ende des 12. Jahrhunderts". In: Quellen und Forschungen aus Italienischen Archiven und Bibliotheken 70 (1990), pp. 46–150. (in German)
- Schwartz, Gerhard (1913), Die Besetzung der Bistümer Reichsitaliens unter den sächsischen und salischen Kaisern : mit den Listen der Bischöfe, 951-1122, Leipzig-Berlin 1913, p. 263 (Roselle). (in German)
- Ughelli, Ferdinando; Coleti, Nicolo (1718). Italia sacra sive de Episcopis Italiae, et insularum adjacentium (in Latin). Vol. Tomus tertius (second ed.). Venice: Apud Sebastianum Coleti. pp. 733–762.
