= Niccola Paracciani Clarelli =

His Eminence Niccola Paracciani Clarelli
- Archpriest of Saint Peter's Basilica
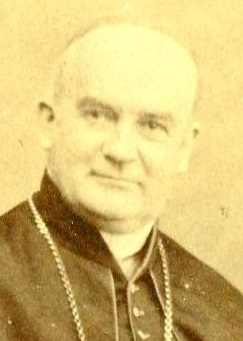
- Circa 1860
- Church: Roman Catholic Church
- Appointed: 8 October 1870
- Term ended: 7 July 1872
- Predecessor: Mario Mattei
- Successor: Edoardo Borromeo
- Other posts: Cardinal-Bishop of Frascati (1867–72); President of the Congregation of the Reverend Basilica of Saint Peter (1870–72)
- Previous posts: Bishop of Montefiascone (1844–54); Bishop of Corneto (1844–54); Cardinal-Priest of San Pietro in Vincoli (1844–67); Prefect of the Congregation of Bishops and Regulars (1860–63); Camerlengo of the College of Cardinals (1863–64)

Orders
- Ordination: 1 June 1822
- Consecration: 11 February 1844 by Pope Gregory XVI
- Created cardinal: 22 January 1844 by Pope Gregory XVI
- Rank: Cardinal-Priest (1844–67); Cardinal-Bishop (1867–72)

Personal details
- Born: 12 April 1799 Rieti, Papal States
- Died: 7 July 1872 (aged 73) Vico Equense, Kingdom of Italy
- Parents: Giuseppe Clarelli; Teresa Parracciani
- Education: Pontifical Academy of Ecclesiastical Nobles

Niccola Paracciani Clarelli (Note: He is sometimes referred to as Nicola Garelli Paracciani or Clarelli Paracciani (or Parraciani), but his see as cardinal bishop uses Niccola Paracciani Clarelli, as do both standard online databases. Vatican records record his signature as "N. Card. PARACCIANI CLARELLI". and the Dizionario Biografico degli Italiani uses that form as well. His first name is also spelled Nicola.) (12 April 1799 – 7 July 1872) was a Catholic Cardinal and was Arch-Priest of St. Peter's Basilica at the Vatican.

He was also Camerlengo of the Sacred College of Cardinals, Prefect of the Congregation for Bishops and Secretary of the Roman Curia.

== Biography ==
Paracciani was born on 12 April 1799 in Rieti. He was educated at the Archgymnasium of Rome where he received a doctorate in utroque iuris, both civil and canon law on 8 July 1822.

While completing his education, he was ordained a priest on 1 June 1822 at age 23. He then attended the Pontifical Academy of Ecclesiastical Nobles to study diplomacy. He spent time as the privy chamberlain to Pope Pius VII in 1819.

On 22 January 1844 he was appointed Bishop of Montefiascone and that same day raised to the rank of cardinal, with the rank of Cardinal-Priest of San Pietro in Vincoli. He received his episcopal consecration at the patriarchal Vatican Basilica from Pope Gregory XVI on 11 February. He resigned as bishop of Montefiascone in 1854.

In 1860, Paracciani was appointed secretary of the Congregation for the Erection of Churches and Consistorial Provisions, the equivalent of the modern role of Prefect of the Congregation for Bishops.

In 1863, he was appointed Camerlengo of the Sacred College of Cardinals and Secretary of the Roman Curia. He was appointed cardinal bishop of Frascati on 22 February 1867 and in 1870 was appointed Archpriest of St. Peter's Basilica. Clarelli participated in the Papal Conclave of 1846 that elected Pope Pius IX and in the First Vatican Council in 1869 and 1870.

Paracciani died on 7 July 1872 at Vico Equense and was temporarily buried there.

== Notes ==
Catholic Church titles
Preceded by Fabio Maria Asquini	Camerlengo of the Sacred College of Cardinals; 1863–1864	Succeeded by Domenico Carafa di Traetto
Preceded by Antonio Maria Cagiano de Azevedo	Cardinal-Bishop of Frascati; 1867–1872	Succeeded by Filippo Maria Guidi
Preceded by Mario Mattei	Archpriest of St. Peter's Basilica; 1870–1872	Succeeded by Edoardo Borromeo
