= Diocese of Prato =

Roman Catholic diocese in Italy

Coordinates: 43.8808°N 11.0966°E

Diocese of Prato Dioecesis Pratensis Diocesi di Prato

Catholic
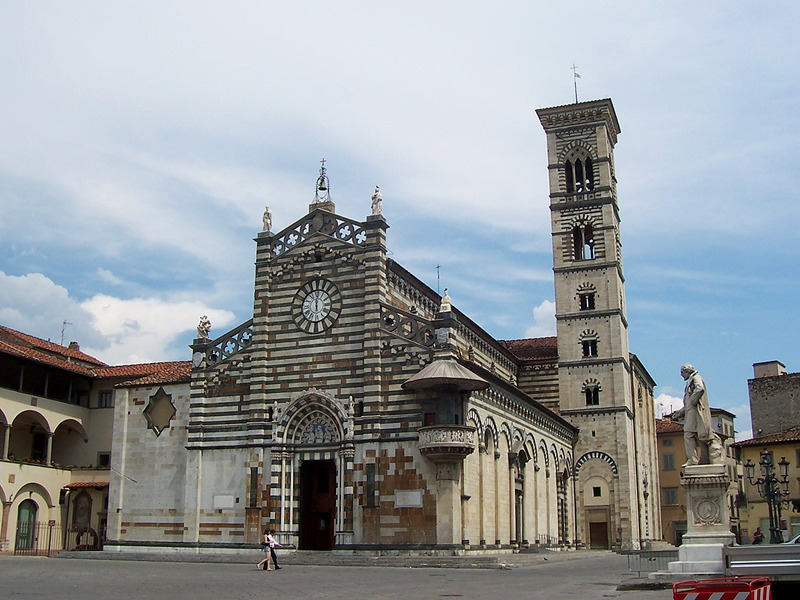
- Prato Cathedral

Location
- Country: Italy
- Ecclesiastical province: Florence
- Metropolitan: Archdiocese of Florence

Statistics
- Area: 287 km^{2} (111 sq mi)
- Population: Total; Catholics: (as of 2021); 213,937; 198,700 (guess)
- Parishes: 84

Information
- Denomination: Roman Catholic
- Rite: Roman Rite
- Established: 25 January 1954 (72 years ago)
- Cathedral: Cathedral Basilica of St Stephen in Prato
- Patron saint: Saint Stephen
- Secular priests: 104 (diocesan); 16 (religious orders); 23 Permanent Deacons

Current leadership
- Pope: Leo XIV
- Bishop: Giovanni Nerbini
- Bishops emeritus: Franco Agostinelli

Map

Website
- www.diocesiprato.it

The Diocese of Prato (Latin: Dioecesis Pratensis) is a Latin diocese of the Catholic Church in Tuscany, Italy, that has existed as an independent entity since 1954. Its see is Prato Cathedral, some 10 miles (17 km) northwest of Florence, on the Bisenzio River. The diocese is a suffragan of the Archdiocese of Florence.

== History ==
The earliest reference to the place occurs in a diploma of the Emperor Otto III in 998, but the earliest use of the word "Prato" occurs in a bull of the bishop of Pistoia, dated 1035.

The church of S. Stefano del borgo Cornio in Prato was already in existence by the 10th century, and was the easternmost parish in the diocese of Pistoia, bordering on the diocese of Florence. It had become a collegiate church, ruled by a provost and a college of canons, by the beginning of the 11th century. Its relationship to the bishops of Pistoia was always difficult.

On 21 May 1123, Pope Innocent II issued a bull in which the papacy took the church of S. Stefano de Prato under its protection, and granted it various privileges, including the right to the 10% income, the privilege of not having any other church inside its boundaries, the right of burial of its parishioners, and the right not to be subjected to interdict or excommunication without just and reasonable cause. The pope did, however, emphasize in a letter of 21 December 1133 that the collegiate church was still subject to the bishop of Pistoia, and owed him obedience and reverence, their privileges notwithstanding.

Pope Celestine III, following the example of his predecessors Pope Innocent II and Pope Lucius III, on 31 August 1191 took the provostship of S. Stefano under the protection of the papacy. The fee was 1 aureus per annum.

In 1239, the community of Prato, which had been staunchly Guelph in consideration of the many favors obtained from the popes, among them a measure of protection from both Pistoia and Florence, experienced a Ghibbeline revolution and joined the party of the Emperor Frederick II. In 1351, Florence acquired the territory of Prato, and built a new and much larger fortress over that of Frederick.

Pope Alexander V was resident in Prato from the end of October 1409 until January 1410, and apparently had in mind to create new dioceses at Prato and at San Miniato. His death in Bologna on 3 May 1410 put an end to his plans.

On 3 September 1460, Pope Pius II removed the Provostship of S. Stefano from the diocese of Pistoria and made it nullius dioecesis (not belonging to any diocese), directly dependent on the Holy See.

Carlo de' Medici, son of Cosimo de' Medici, became the first territorial prelate of Prato.

=== Creation of diocese ===
The diocese of Prato was created on 22 September 1653, by Pope Innocent X in the bull "Redemptoris Nostri". It was permanently attached, aeque personaliter, to the diocese of Pistoia. The collegiate church of S. Stefano became the Cathedral of the new diocese and its Chapter of Canons became a Cathedral chapter, consisting of the Provost, five dignities (the Primicerius, the Archpriest, the Archdeacon, the Dean, and the Treasurer) and nineteen canons. The motive forces behind the promotion were Cardinal Carlo de'Medici, Bishop of Ostia, Dean of the College of Cardinals, and Provost Commendatory of S. Stefano di Prato; and his nephew, Ferdinando II de' Medici, Grand Duke of Tuscany. Duke Ferdinand raised the oppidum of Prato to the rank of civitas in recognition of its greater importance.

The diocese became independent when the Diocese of Pistoia e Prato was split by Pope Pius XII on 25 January 1954. The seat of the bishop was to be in the cathedral of S. Stefano, which had been a cathedral since 1653. The cathedral was named a minor basilica on 31 July 1996, by Pope John Paul II.

=== Churches ===
- Santa Maria Assunta in Filettole
- Santa Maria delle Carceri, Prato, named a minor basilica in 1939 by Pope Pius XII.
- Santi Vicenzo e Caterina de' Ricci, Prato, named a minor basilica in 1947 by Pope Pius XII.

== Bishops ==
- Pietro Fiordelli (7 July 1954 – 1991)
- Gastone Simoni (1991 – 2012)
- Franco Agostinelli (2012 – 15 May 2019)
- Giovanni Nerbini (15 May 2019 – present)

== See also ==
- Roman Catholic Diocese of Pistoia

== Sources ==
- Cappelletti, Giuseppe (1862). Le chiese d'Italia dalla loro origine sino ai nostri giorni (in Italian). Vol. Tomo decimosettimo (17). Venezia: Antonelli. pp. 136–169.
- Carlesi, Ferdinando (1904). Origini della città e del comune di Prato. Prato: Alberghetti 1904.
- Fantappiè, Renzo (ed.) (2022). Le carte della propositura di S. Stefano di Prato. II. 1201-1300. Florence: Società Editrice Fiorentina 2022.
- Guasti, Cesare (1846). Della chiesa cattedrale di Prato. Descrizione corredata di notizie storiche e di documenti inediti. Prato 1846.
- Kehr, Paul Fridolin (1908). Italia pontificia (in Latin). Vol. 3. Tomus Tertius: Etruria. Berlin: Weidmann. pp. 134–143.
- Lamberti, Claudia (2005). "Il castello dell’Imperatore a Prato," (in Italian), in: Prato, storia ed arte, 97, N.S. 4, 2005, pp. 105–118.
- Papini, Pietro (1871). Notizie storiche intorno all'origine di Prato: alla sua chiesa cattedrale.... Prato: Vincenzo Galli, 1871.
