= Ribolla =

- Frazione
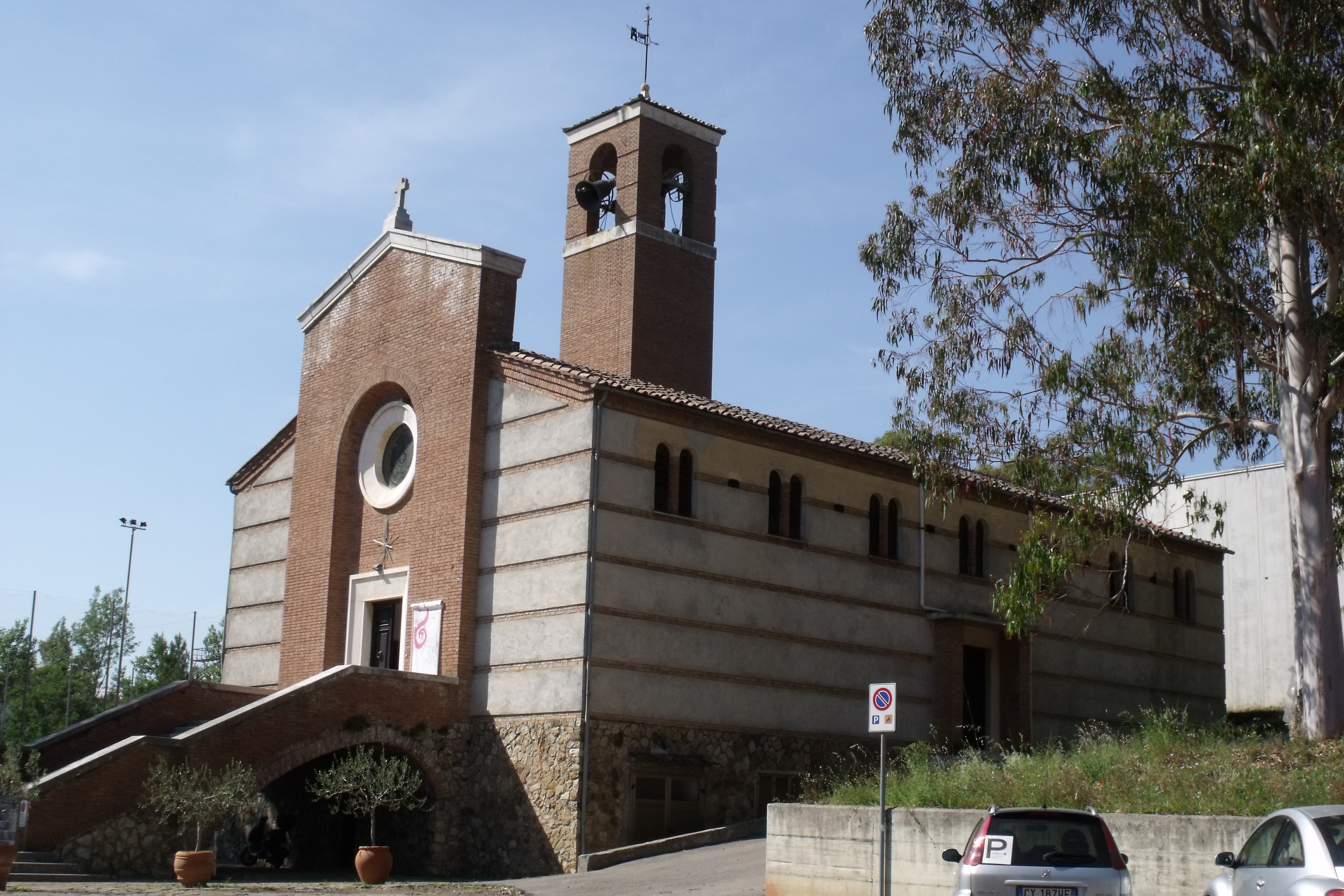
- The church of Santi Barbara and Paolo

- Location of Ribolla in Italy
- Coordinates: 42°58′11″N 11°02′20″E
- Country: Italy
- Region: Tuscany
- Province: Grosseto (GR)
- Comune: Roccastrada
- Elevation: 57 m (187 ft)

Population (2011)
  - Total: 2,438
- Demonym: Ribollini
- Time zone: UTC+1 (CET)
  - Summer (DST): UTC+2 (CEST)
- Postal code: 58027
- Dialing code: (+39) 0564

Ribolla is a village in southern Tuscany, a frazione of the comune of Roccastrada, in the province of Grosseto. At the time of the 2001 census its population amounted to 2,115.

In 1954, a mine exploded killing forty-three workers. The incident was reported by Luciano Bianciardi and Carlo Cassola in the essay I minatori della Maremma (The miners of Maremma), and has been a source of inspiration for Bianciardi's novel La vita agra and for the film of the same name directed by Carlo Lizzani.

== Main sights ==
- Santi Barbara e Paolo, main parish church in Ribolla, it was designed by engineer Ernesto Ganelli and consecrated in 1941.
- Monumento al minatore ("Monument to the miner") by Vittorio Basaglia.

== See also ==
- Montemassi
- Piloni
- Roccatederighi
- Sassofortino
- Sticciano
- Torniella
