= It's a Hard Life (disambiguation) =

It's a Hard Life may refer to:

- ”It's a Hard Life”, a song by the British rock band Queen, written by lead singer Freddie Mercury and featured on their 1984 album The Works
- It's a Hard Life, Italian novel by Luciano Bianciardi
- "It's a Hard Life", song by Roger Daltrey from his 1973 album Daltrey
- "It's a Hard Life Wherever You Go", a song by Nanci Griffith from her 1989 album Storms
