= Sticciano railway station =

Railway station in Italy

Sticciano
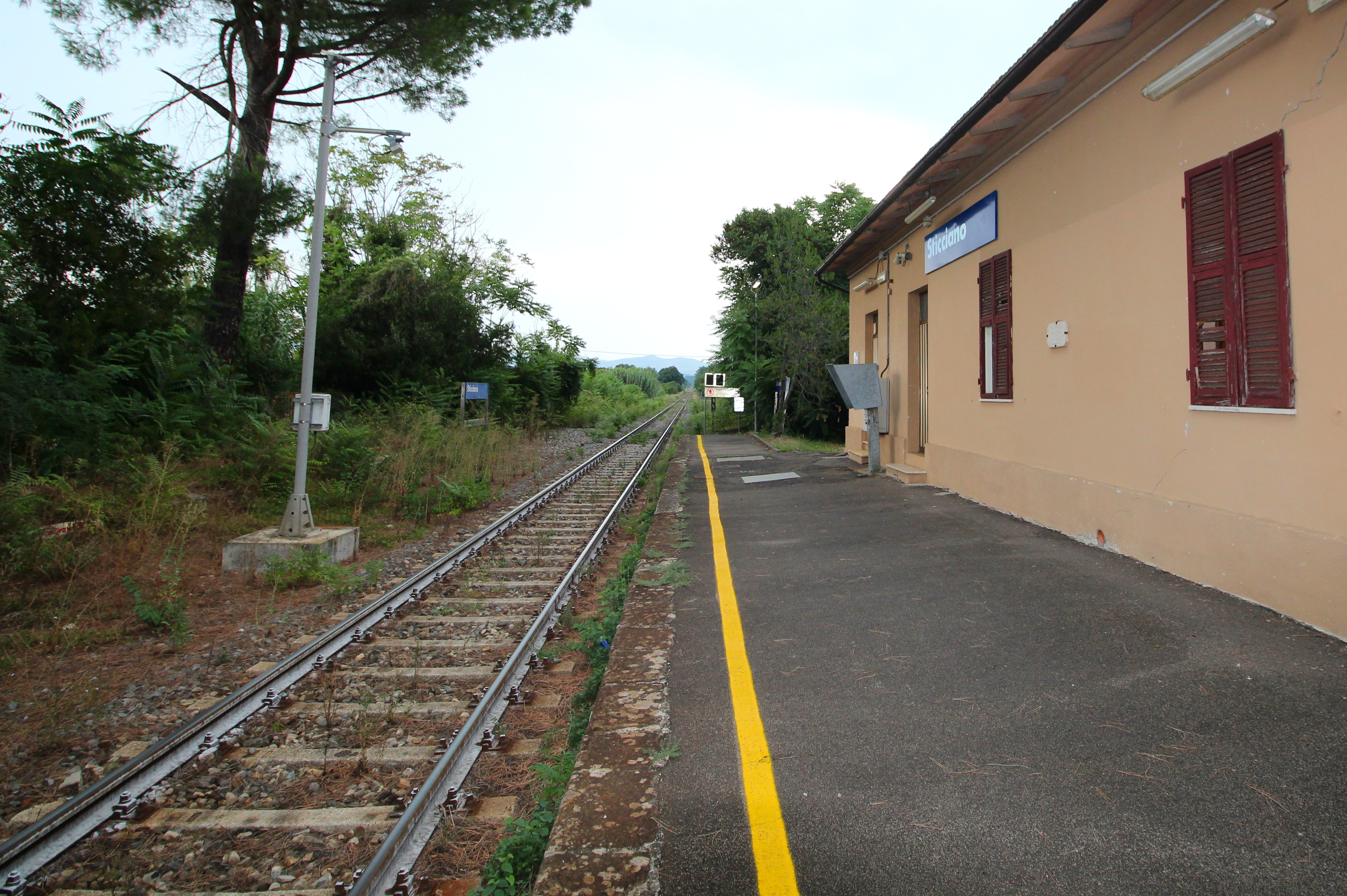

General information
- Location: Piazza della Stazione, Sticciano Scalo; Roccastrada, Grosseto, Tuscany; Italy
- Coordinates: 42°55′44.8″N 11°7′7″E
- Operator: Rete Ferroviaria Italiana; Trenitalia
- Line: Siena–Grosseto
- Tracks: 1

Other information
- Classification: Bronze

History
- Opened: 1872; 154 years ago
Location
- Location within Tuscany Location within Italy

Sticciano railway station is an Italian railway station on the Siena–Grosseto railway line, located in Sticciano, in the municipality of Roccastrada, Province of Grosseto, Tuscany.

== History ==
The station opened in 1872 following the inauguration of the Siena–Grosseto railway line.

== Train services and movements ==
Regular passenger services to the station consist of regionale and regionale veloce services, which run to Grosseto, Siena, and Florence SMN.

== See also ==
- History of rail transport in Italy
- List of railway stations in Tuscany
- Rail transport in Italy
- Railway stations in Italy
