= Luciano Bianciardi =

Italian writer, journalist, and translator (1922–1971)

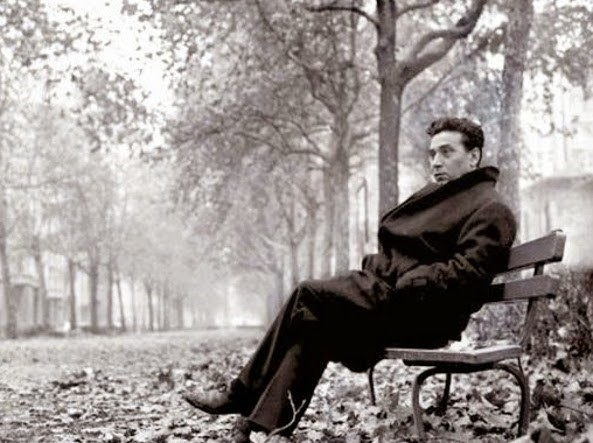
- Luciano Bianciardi in Milan (1964)
- Born: 14 December 1922; Grosseto, Italy
- Died: 14 November 1971 (aged 48); Milan, Italy
- Occupations: Writer, journalist, translator, librarian
- Writing career
- Notable works: Il lavoro culturale L'integrazione; La vita agra

Luciano Bianciardi (Italian pronunciation: [luˈtʃaːno bjanˈtʃardi]; 14 December 1922 – 14 November 1971) was an Italian writer, journalist, translator and librarian. He contributed significantly to the cultural ferment in post-war Italy, working actively with various publishing houses, magazines and newspapers. His work is characterized by periods of rebellion against the cultural establishment, to which he also belonged, and by a careful analysis of social habits during Italian economic miracle. His most famous novel, La vita agra, became a bestseller in Italy and was translated into several languages. In 1964, it was made into a film adaptation directed by Carlo Lizzani.

Bianciardi was the first Italian translator of Henry Miller's Tropic of Cancer and Tropic of Capricorn, Saul Bellow's Henderson the Rain King, John Steinbeck's The Winter of Our Discontent and Travels with Charley, Jack London's John Barleycorn, J.P. Donleavy's The Ginger Man and William Faulkner's A Fable and The Mansion.

== Early life and education ==
Luciano Bianciardi was born on Via Ivo Saletti (now Via Bruno Buozzi) in Grosseto on 14 December 1922. His father, Atide, was a cashier at the Banca Toscana, while his mother, Adele Guidi, was an elementary school teacher who always demanded excellence in studies from her son. Bianciardi remembered her with these words: "I was her student before being her son for the beautiful span of thirty-two years. It's like having a 'teacher for life,' and teachers for life aren't easy." From his father, with whom he had a good relationship, he inherited a passion for soccer (Atide had been a goalkeeper in the first team of US Grosseto) and for the Italian unification movement, the Risorgimento. At the age of 8, he received the book he would always consider his favourite, I Mille by Giuseppe Bandi, a story of Giuseppe Garibaldi's Expedition of the Thousand. As a child, he also studied the cello, always under his mother's pressure.

He attended the gymnasium and subsequently the classical high school at Carducci-Ricasoli in Grosseto, but experienced considerable discomfort during those years of study. In 1940, after being promoted to the third year of high school, he attempted the final exam directly without attending the final year: he passed it in the autumn when the war had already broken out. In November, Bianciardi enrolled in the Faculty of Arts and Philosophy in Pisa. During his early university years, he moved toward liberal socialism, only to drift away from it shortly thereafter. At the end of January 1943, he was drafted and was then sent to Apulia, where he witnessed one of the bombings of Foggia on 22 July. After the armistice of Cassibile, he joined a British unit as an interpreter and made his way up the peninsula to Forlì. He returned to Grosseto in the autumn of 1944. In November, he participated in the competition reserved for veterans to resume studies at the Scuola Normale Superiore in Pisa, and in February 1948, he graduated in Philosophy with a thesis on John Dewey.

A member of the Action Party since 1945, he experienced a deep disappointment when the party dissolved in 1947, to the point that he no longer registered with any political organization. During these same years, he was significantly influenced both by the works of Antonio Gramsci, and by the American culture he had explored in his studies, both academic and informal, of philosophy and literature.

== Career ==
=== Cultural activism in Grosseto ===
Back in Grosseto, Bianciardi married Adria Belardi in April 1948. In October of the following year, he became a father for the first time when his son Ettore was born. Bianciardi worked as a history and philosophy teacher at the Carducci-Ricasoli high school until 1951, when he was appointed director of the Chelliana Library. The library had been severely damaged by the bombings of 1943 and the flood of the Ombrone River in 1944, and Bianciardi himself had worked as a volunteer to clean the books from the mud.

In this new role, Bianciardi organized lectures and debates, and launched the "Bibliobus" service, one of the earliest in Italy. He also ran a film club, affiliated with the Italian Communist Party, and started a friendship with writer Carlo Cassola. He participated with Cassola in the creation of the Popular Unity movement, opposing the 1953 electoral law, also labelled as "Fraud Law". This began a period of intense collaborations, initially in the local press and then in more prominent publications, such as Belfagor, Avanti!, Il Mondo, and Il Contemporaneo.

Alongside his work as a journalist, he began to take an interest in the labour struggles, particularly those of the miners in the province of Grosseto. Together with his friend Cassola, he conducted an investigation for Avanti! titled I minatori della Maremma ("The Miners of Maremma"), published as a book in 1956 by Laterza. The investigation exposed the harsh living conditions of the workers and the poverty of their families, which he had personally witnessed, often visiting the mining village of Ribolla. "I chose to stand by the side of the shovelers and miners of my land – he wrote in 1952 – those who work in the icy water with their legs sucked dry by leeches, those who, a hundred, two hundred meters underground, consume their lungs day by day breathing silica dust. They too have children like mine, they have a future to build". His relationship with the residents of Ribolla was very close and profoundly affected him when, on 4 May 1954, one of the coal mine's shafts exploded, killing 43 workers. For Bianciardi, this tragedy marked "the end of a period, of an enthusiasm, of a collective hope, and the beginning of a state of closure in which the entire country seemed destined to fall."

He subsequently accepted the invitation to move to Milan to participate in the establishment of a new publishing house, Feltrinelli, and left Grosseto in June 1954.

=== Feltrinelli and the first novels ===
In Milan, Bianciardi went to live with Maria Jatosti, a communist poet and journalist he met at a conference, who became his partner. In 1955, however, Luciana, his second daughter with his wife Adria, was born. A few months later, Adria discovered that her husband had another woman in Milan, and the two separated.

Bianciardi contributed to the film magazine Cinema Nuovo, directed by Guido Aristarco, and worked as an editor for Feltrinelli until 1956, when he was dismissed "for poor performance". His relationship with his former employer remained good, and in fact, in 1957, his first novel, Il lavoro culturale ("Cultural Work"), was published by Feltrinelli. This work, openly autobiographical, humorously recounts the formation and disillusionment of young intellectuals from the provinces in the post-war period.

In 1958, Bianciardi became a father for the third time with Marcello, son of Maria Jatosti. In 1960, he published L'integrazione ("The Integration") with Bompiani. The novel ironically deals with the conflict of two intellectuals from Grosseto with the environment and customs of the Milanese publishing industry during the so-called "economic miracle".

=== The work as a translator ===
The years between 1954 and 1962 proved to be particularly tough and difficult, both due to the isolation in which Bianciardi found himself and the economic hardships caused by his dismissal by Feltrinelli. He then dedicated himself to translations from English, a work that would constitute his main occupation for his entire life. The first book translated by Bianciardi was The Scourge of the Swastika by Lord Russell of Liverpool. In particular, he translated numerous American writers during his career: Jack London, William Faulkner, John Steinbeck, and Henry Miller. From the latter, he translated Tropic of Cancer and Tropic of Capricorn. He translated Saul Bellow's Henderson the Rain King, Steinbeck's The Winter of Our Discontent and Travels with Charley, London's John Barleycorn, J.P. Donleavy's The Ginger Man, and Faulkner's A Fable and The Mansion.

Among the others, he also translated: Stephen Crane's Maggie and The Red Badge of Courage, Fred Hoyle's The Black Cloud, Osamu Dazai's The Setting Sun, Cyril Northcote Parkinson's Parkinson's Law, Mary Renault's The King Must Die, Brendan Behan's Borstal Boy, Irwin Shaw's Tip on a Dead Jockey, Aldous Huxley's Brave New World Revisited, Richard Brautigan's A Confederate General from Big Sur, Thomas Berger's Little Big Man and Killing Time.

=== La vita agra ===
In 1962, Bianciardi published the novel La vita agra, with Rizzoli. The novel tells the story of an intellectual who wants to blow up the headquarters of the company responsible for the deaths of 43 miners (the reference is to the Montecatini company and the Ribolla tragedy). It received widespread success, both critical and public (5,000 copies sold within a few days), making Bianciardi a famous writer in just a few months. The novel was translated into English, French, German and Spanish. The English-language edition, translated by Eric Mosbacher, was published by Hodder & Stoughton in the United Kingdom, and by Viking Press in the United States.

The Italian public broadcasting company, RAI, went to interview him at his home in Milan, on Via Domenichino 2. Journalist Luigi Silori filmed a segment in which Bianciardi read the passage from the novel that described his morning outing for coffee and cigarettes, a foreigner in that city, while images of 1960s Milan rolled by. The program inspired director Carlo Lizzani, who in 1964 directed Ugo Tognazzi in the film adaptation of the novel, for which Bianciardi also contributed to the screenplay and made a brief cameo appearance.

During the same period, and also for RAI, Bianciardi was interviewed by Giorgio Bocca as an expert on Milan's nightlife and the environments frequented by the underworld. The promotional tour for La vita agra left him morally drained: the mechanical nature of the performance he had to reproduce for the audience each time ended up humiliating him, and Bianciardi retreated once again into his work as a translator.

=== The Risorgimento novels and last works ===
After the success of La vita agra, he abandoned the genre that had brought him fame and revisited the Risorgimento with the novel La battaglia soda ("The Firm Battle"), which was released in 1964 by Rizzoli. The novel is inspired by his favourite childhood book, I Mille by Giuseppe Bandi, and Bandi himself is the novel's protagonist and alter ego of the author. That same year, he moved to Sant'Anna di Rapallo, in the province of Genoa, together with Jatosti and their son Marcello.

He rejected a permanent collaboration with Corriere della Sera, but accepted to write for Il Giorno, a partnership that lasted until 1966. He distanced himself from the intellectual environment by writing short stories, articles, and columns for erotic, sports, and sensational magazines such as Kent, Executive, Playmen, Le Ore, Guerin Sportivo, and ABC, where he had one of the first television criticism columns, "TeleBianciardi".

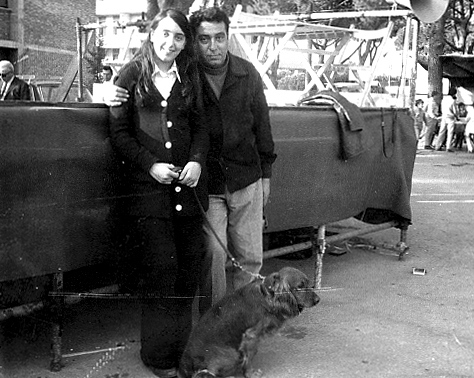
Bianciardi with his daughter Luciana in Grosseto

In 1969, he published his fifth and final novel, Aprire il fuoco ("Open Fire"), a complex alternate history novel that combines criticism of contemporary society against the backdrop of the Risorgimento riots. In that same year, he also published Viaggio in Barberia, a travel report in North Africa funded by the Automobile Club d'Italia. His relationship with Jatosti gradually deteriorated, also due to his progressive alcoholism, until she left him, taking Marcello with her. In 1970, he returned to Milan, and later appeared in the comedy The Naked Cello, a film adaptation of his short story "Il complesso di Loth".

In these years, despite his descent into alcoholism, Bianciardi began to reconnect with his hometown, feeling remorse for having abandoned it years earlier. He returned more often to Grosseto and reconnected with his now-teenage daughter Luciana, whom he had never known. On 10 August 1970, he was awarded the Grifone d'Oro, the highest civic honour of the municipality of Grosseto.

== Death ==
His severe alcohol dependency prematurely took his life at the age of 48, on 14 November 1971, in Milan. He was buried in the Cemetery of Misericordia in Grosseto.

== Works ==
=== Novels ===
- Il lavoro culturale ("Cultural Work"), 1957.
- L'integrazione ("The Integration"), 1960.
- La vita agra ("The Bitter Life"), 1962.
  - La vita agra: or, It's a Hard Life, Hodder & Stoughton, London, 1965; translation by Eric Mosbacher.
  - La vita agra. It's a Hard Life, Viking Press, New York, 1965; translation by Eric Mosbacher.
- La battaglia soda ("The Firm Battle"), 1964.
- Aprire il fuoco ("Open Fire"), 1969.

=== Non-fiction ===
- I minatori della Maremma ("The Miners of the Maremma"), with Carlo Cassola, 1956.
- Da Quarto a Torino ("From Quarto to Turin"), 1960.
- Dághela avanti un passo! ("Come on, a Step Forward!"), 1969.
- Viaggio in Barberia ("A Trip to Barbary"), 1969.
- Garibaldi, 1972.

=== Short stories collections ===
- Il peripatetico e altre storie, Rizzoli, 1976.
  - La solita zuppa e altre storie, Bompiani, 1994.

== Filmography ==
- La vita agra, directed by Carlo Lizzani (1964)
- Secret Fantasy, directed by Pasquale Festa Campanile (1971)

== Sources ==
- Biscione, Francesco Maria (1988). "BIANCIARDI, Luciano". Dizionario Biografico degli Italiani (in Italian). Vol. 34: Primo supplemento A–C. Rome: Istituto dell'Enciclopedia Italiana. ISBN 978-88-12-00032-6.
- Gambacorti, Irene (2001). Luciano Bianciardi. Bibliografia (1948-1998). Florence: Studio Editoriale Fiorentino.
- Terrosi, Mario; Gessani, Alberto (1985). L'intellettuale disintegrato: Luciano Bianciardi. Rome.
