= Eric Mosbacher =

English journalist and translator (1903–1998)

Eric Mosbacher (22 December 1903 – 2 July 1998) was an English journalist and translator from Italian, French, German, and Spanish. He translated work by Ignazio Silone and Sigmund Freud.

== Life ==
Eric Mosbacher was born in London. He was educated at St Paul's School and Magdalene College, Cambridge, graduating in 1924 in French and Italian. After working on local newspapers, he worked for the Daily Express and then the Evening Standard. He also worked as assistant editor of the weekly Everyman and editor of Anglo-American News, the London journal of the American Chamber of Commerce. Mosbacher's wife, Gwenda David, introduced him to the work of Ignazio Silone, and the pair translated Silone's anti-fascist novel Fontamara in 1934. Often working in collaboration with his wife, Mosbacher continued translating in parallel with his other jobs.

During World War II, Mosbacher worked as an interpreter interrogating Italian prisoners of war before joining the Political Warfare Executive in 1943, working alongside Sefton Delmer to produce a German-language newspaper to be dropped on Germany each night. In June 1945, he was sent to the Rhineland, now occupied by the British, to encourage a free press by starting two German-language newspapers there, Kolnischer Kurier and Ruhr-Zeitung. Demobilized in 1946 at the rank of lieutenant-colonel, Mosbacher was a public relations officer for the Ministry of Town and Country Planning before joining The Times as a sub-editor in 1948. Resigning from the Times in 1960, he continued to work at translation.

== Translations ==
- (with Gwenda David) Fontamara by Ignazio Silone. London: Methuen & Co., 1934.
- (with Gwenda David) Spiridonova: revolutionary terrorist by Isaac Steinberg. London: Methuen & Co., 1935.
- (with Gwenda David) The last civilian by Ernst Glaeser. London: Nicholson & Watson, 1936.
- (with Gwenda David) Karl Marx: man and fighter by Boris Nicolaevsky and Otto Maenchen-Helfen. London: Methuen & Co., 1936.
- (with Gwenda David) Bread and wine by Ignazio Silone. London: Methuen & Co., 1936.
- (with Gwenda David) Offenbach and the Paris of his time by Siegfried Kracauer. London: Constable, 1937.
- The Triumph of Barabbas by Giovanni Giglio. London: Victor Gollancz, 1937.
- (with Franz Borkenau) I helped to build an army. Civil War memoirs of a Spanish staff officer by José Martín Blázquez. Translated from the Spanish. With an introduction by Borkenau. London: Secker & Warburg, 1939.
- (with Gwenda David) The school for dictators by Ignazio Silone. Translated from the Italian. London: Jonathan Cape, 1939.
- (with Gwenda David) Hitler and I. Translated from the French Hitler et moi. London: Jonathan Cape, 1940.
- (with Gwenda David) Birl. The story of a cat by Alexander Moritz Frey. London: Jonathan Cape, 1947.
- The fiancée by Alberto Vigevani. Translated from the Italian. London: Hamish Hamilton, 1948.
- The house by the medlar tree by Giovanni Verga. Translated from the Italian I Malavoglia. London: Weidenfeld & Nicolson, 1950.
- A hero of our time: a novel by Vasco Pratolini. Translated from the Italian Un eroe del nostro tempo. London: Hamish Hamilton, 1951.
- (with David Porter) Russian purge and the extraction of confession by F. Beck (pseud.) and W. Godin (pseud.). Translated from the German. London: Hurst & Blackett, 1951.
- Secret Tibet by Fosco Maraini. Translated from the Italian Segreto Tibet. London: Hutchinson, 1952.
- Heaven pays no dividends by Richard Kaufmann. Translated from the German Der Himmel zahlt keine Zinsen. London: Jarrolds, 1952.
- (with James Strachey) The origins of psycho-analysis. Letters to Wilhelm Fliess, drafts and notes: 1887–1902 by Sigmund Freud. Translated from the German Aus den Anfängen der Psychoanalyse. Briefe an Wilhelm Fliess. London: Imago Publishing Co., 1954.
- Final contributions to the problems and methods of psycho-analysis by Sándor Ferenczi. Translated from the German. London: Hogarth Press, 1955.
- The state of France: a study of contemporary France by Herbert Lüthy. Translated from the German Frankreichs Uhren gehen anders. London: Secker & Warburg, 1955.
- The bound man, and other stories by Ilse Aichinger. London: Secker & Warburg, 1955.
- Tune for an elephant by Elio Vittorini. Translated from the Italian Il Sempione strizza l'occhio al Frejus .London: Weidenfeld & Nicolson, 1955.
- (with Oliver Coburn) Ambush by Jean Hougron. Translated from the French Rage blanche. London: Hurst & Blackett, 1956.
- My secret diary of the Dreyfus case, 1894–1899 by Maurice Paléologue. Translated from the French. London : Secker & Warburg, 1957.
- Meeting with Japan by Fosco Maraini. Translated from the Italian Ora Giapponesi. New York: The Viking Press, 1959.
- Ferdydurke by Witold Gombrowicz. London: Macgibbon & Kee, 1961.
- (with Vivian Milroy) With my dogs in Russia by Hildegard Plievier. London: Hammond, Hammond & Co., 1961.
- The fight against cancer by Charles Oberling. London: A. Deutsch, 1961.
- The fox and the camelias by Ignazio Silone. London: Jonathan Cape, 1961.
- The realm of the Great Goddess. The story of the megalith builders by Sybille von Cles-Reden. London: Thames & Hudson, 1962.
- Hekura: the diving girls' island by Fosco Maraini. London: H. Hamilton, 1962.
- I was Cicero by Elyesa Bazna. London: A. Deutsch, 1962.
- The shady miracle by Ernst Glaeser. London: Secker & Warburg, 1963.
- Thou shalt not kill by Igor Šentjurc. Translated from the German Der unstillbare Strom. London, Dublin: Constable, 1963.
- Psycho-analysis and faith: the letters of Sigmund Freud & Oskar Pfister by Sigmund Freud. London: Hogarth Press, 1963.
- (with Denise Folliot) The better song by Luc Estang. Translated from the French Le Bonheur et le salut. London: Hodder & Stoughton, 1964.
- The torrents of war by Igor Šentjurc. Translated from the German. London: Transworld Publishers, 1965.
- Mannerism. The crisis of the Renaissance and the origin of modern art by Arnold Hauser. 2 vols. London: Routledge & Kegan Paul, 1965.
- La Vita agra; or, It's a hard life by Luciano Bianciardi. London: Hodder & Stoughton, 1965.
- Simplicius 45: a novel by Heinz Küpper. Translated from the German. London: Secker & Warburg, 1966.
- Remembrance Day: thirteen attempts in prose to adopt an attitude of respect by Gerhard Zwerenz. London: Hutchinson, 1966.
- The end of the Jewish people? by Georges Friedmann. Translated from the French Fin du peuple juif?. London: Hutchinson, 1967.
- Cosmos by Witold Gombrowicz. Translated from the French and German translations. London: Macgibbon & Kee, 1967.
- Society without the father: a contribution to social psychology by Alexander Mitscherlich. London: Tavistock Publications, 1969.
- Equilibrium by Tonino Guerra. Translated from the Italian. London: Chatto & Windus, 1969.
- (with others) Dietrich Bonhoeffer: theologian, Christian, contemporary by Eberhard Bethge. London: Collins, 1970.
- The end of an alliance: Rome's defection from the Axis in 1943 by Friedrich-Karl von Plehwe. Translated from the German Schicksalsstunden in Rom. London: Oxford University Press, 1971.
- Fragments grave and gay by Karl Barth. London: William Collins Sons & Co., 1971.
- Infallible? an enquiry by Hans Küng. Translated from the German Unfehlbar? Eine Anfrage. London: Collins, 1971.
- The hollow legions: Mullsolini's blunder in Greece, 1940–1941 by Mario Cervi. London: Chatto & Windus, 1972.
- Marxism and history by Helmut Fischer. Translated from the German Marxismus und Geschichte. London: Allen Lane, 1973.
- Solzhenitsyn by Giovanni Grazzini. Translated from the Italian. London: Joseph, 1973.
- Commemorations by Hans Herlin. Translated from the German Freunde. London: Heinemann, 1975.
- Children of the SS by Clarissa Henry and Marc Hillel. Translated from the French Au nom de la race. London: Hutchinson, 1976.
- The nuclear state by Robert Jungk. Translated from the German Atomstaat. London: J. Calder, 1979.
- The biology of peace and war: men, animals and aggression by Irenäus Eibl-Eibesfeldt. London: Thames and Hudson, 1979.
- Cocaine by Pitigrilli. Feltham: Hamlyn Paperbacks, 1982.
- Franz Kafka of Prague by Jǐrí Gruša. Translated from the German Franz Kafka aus Prag. London: Secker & Warburg, 1983.
- Nomenklatura: anatomy of the Soviet ruling class by Michael Voslenski. London: The Bodley Head, 1984.
- Leonardo's Judas by Leo Perutz. Translated from the German Der Judas des Leonardo. London: Collins Harvill, 1989.
- Saint Peter's snow by Leo Perutz. Translated from the German Sankt Petri-Schnee. London: Collins-Harvill, 1990.
- By night under the stone bridge by Leo Perutz. Translated from the German Nachts unter der steinemen Brücke. London: Collins Harvill, 1989.
- Psychoanalysis of the sexual functions of women by Helen Deutsch. London: Karnac, 1990.
- The Master of the Day of Judgment by Leo Perutz. Translated from the German Meister des jüngsten Tages. London: Harvill, 1994.
