= Piloni =

- Frazione
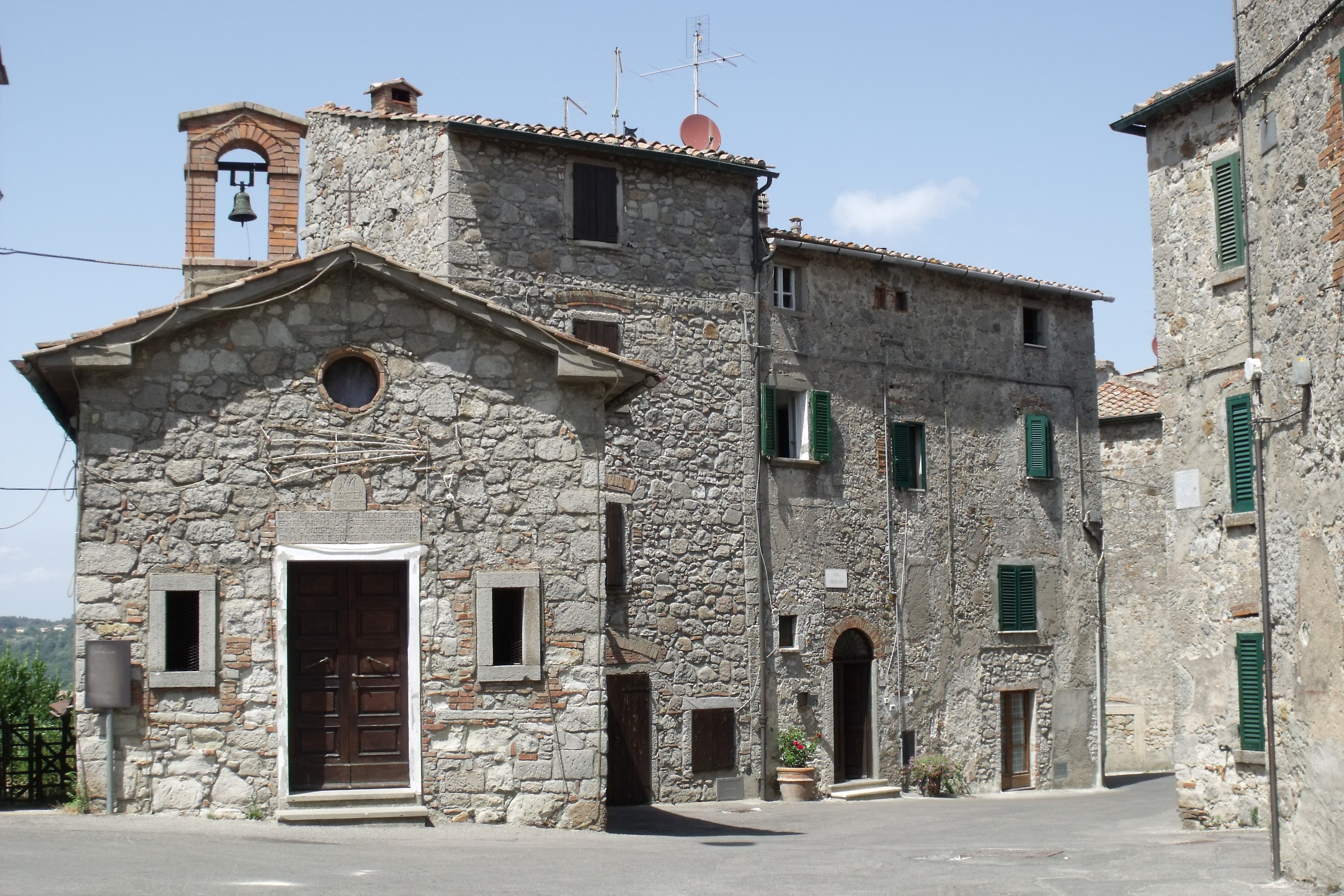
- The church of Santa Maria delle Grazie

- Location of Piloni in Italy
- Coordinates: 43°3′58″N 11°9′6″E
- Country: Italy
- Region: Tuscany
- Province: Grosseto (GR)
- Comune: Roccastrada
- Elevation: 474 m (1,555 ft)

Population (2011)
  - Total: 132
- Demonym: Pilonai
- Time zone: UTC+1 (CET)
  - Summer (DST): UTC+2 (CEST)
- Postal code: 58036
- Dialing code: (+39) 0564

Piloni is a village in Tuscany, central Italy, administratively a frazione of the comune of Roccastrada, province of Grosseto. At the time of the 2001 census, its population amounted to 152.

Piloni is about 45 km from Grosseto and 10 km from Roccastrada, and it is situated in the heart of La Pietra and Farma nature reserves.

== Main sights ==
- Santa Maria delle Grazie (19th century), main parish church of the village

== Bibliography ==
- Aldo Mazzolai, Guida della Maremma. Percorsi tra arte e natura, Le Lettere, Florence, 1997.

== See also ==
- Montemassi
- Ribolla
- Roccatederighi
- Sassofortino
- Sticciano
- Torniella
