= Roccatederighi =

- Frazione
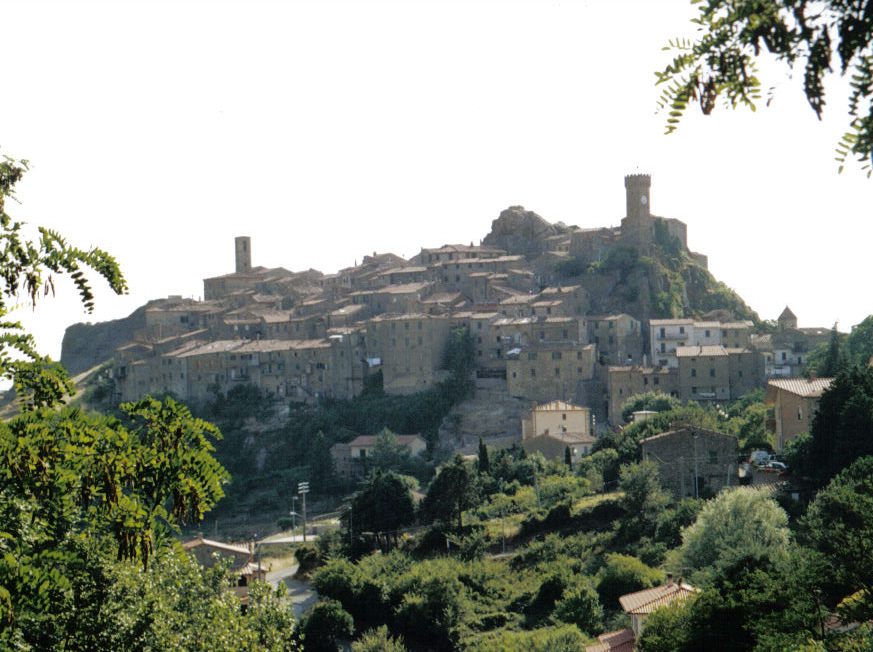
- View of Roccatederighi

- Location of Roccatederighi in Italy
- Coordinates: 43°1′40″N 11°4′53″E
- Country: Italy
- Region: Tuscany
- Province: Grosseto (GR)
- Comune: Roccastrada
- Elevation: 537 m (1,762 ft)

Population (2011)
  - Total: 773
- Demonym: Rocchigiani
- Time zone: UTC+1 (CET)
  - Summer (DST): UTC+2 (CEST)
- Postal code: 58036
- Dialing code: (+39) 0564

Roccatederighi is a village in Tuscany, central Italy, administratively a frazione of the comune of Roccastrada, province of Grosseto. At the time of the 2001 census its population amounted to 846.

Roccatederighi is a hilly medieval village situated about 35 km from Grosseto and 11 km from Roccastrada.

== Main sights ==
- Church of San Martino (10th century), main parish church of the village
- Church of San Sebastiano (16th century), with a neo-classical facade of 1860.
- Walls of Roccatederighi, old fortifications which surround the village since 11th century
- Castle with clock tower, a 13th-century fortress

== Bibliography ==
- Aldo Mazzolai, Guida della Maremma. Percorsi tra arte e natura, Le Lettere, Florence, 1997.
- Giuseppe Guerrini, Torri e castelli della Provincia di Grosseto, Nuova Immagine Editrice, Siena, 1999.

== See also ==
- Montemassi
- Piloni
- Ribolla
- Sassofortino
- Sticciano
- Torniella
