= Hans Herlin =

German novelist

Hans Herlin (1925–December 20, 1994) was a German novelist. Born in Stadtlohn, North Rhine-Westphalia (Germany), he was drafted into the Luftwaffe in World War II and trained as a pilot. In 1944 he fled to Switzerland and lived in France from 1972. He started a writing career as a journalist and worked his way up to become managing editor of Molden, one of Germany's largest publishing houses. In 1961 he wrote a detailed account of the St Louis voyage with 900+ Jewish refugees from Hamburg to Cuba and on to Antwerp, called "Kein gelobtes Land". In 1972 he began writing books full time, and in 1975 published his best known novel Commemorations (Freunde), about "Nazi skeletons in the national closet". Commemorations was published in the United States in 1975 by St. Martin's Press. His books have been published in more than 18 countries.

Herlin died of a heart attack at age 68, at his home in Autun, Burgundy on December 20, 1994.

== List of Novels ==
- Udet, eines Mannes Leben und die Geschichte seiner Zeit (1958) (a.k.a. Der Teufelsflieger. Ernst Udet und die Geschichte seiner Zeit)
  - English: Udet: A Man's Life, translation by Mervyn Savill (1960)
- Verdammter Atlantik. Schicksale Deutscher U-Boot-Fahrer. Tatsachenbericht (1959)
- Kain, wo ist dein Bruder Abel? Die Flieger von Hiroshima und Nagasaki (1960) (a.k.a. Achtung Welt, Hier ist Kreuzweg! Die Flieger von Hiroshima)
- Kein gelobtes Land. Die Irrfahrt der St. Louis (1961)
- Die Welt des Übersinnlichen (1965)
- Freunde (1974)
  - English: Commemorations, translation by Eric Mosbacher (1975) (a.k.a. The Reckoning)
- Feuer im Gras (1975)
  - English: Which Way the Wind, translation by Richard and Clara Winston (1978)
- Tag- und Nachtgeschichten (1978)
- Der letzte Mann von der Doggerbank. Tatsachenbericht (1979)
  - English: The Survivor. The True Story of the Sinking of the Doggerbank, translation by John Brownjohn (1995)
- Die Sturmflut. Nordseeküste und Hamburg im Februar 1962 (1980)
- Die Geliebte. Die tragische Liebe der Clara Petacci zu Benito Mussolini (1980)
- Satan ist auf Gottes Seite (1981)
  - English: Solo Run, translation by John Brownjohn (1983)
- Der letzte Frühling in Paris (1983)
  - English: The Last Spring in Paris, translation by John Brownjohn (1985)
- Grishin oder das Lächeln Lenins (1985)
  - English: Grishin, translation by John Brownjohn (1987)
- Sibirien-Transfer (1988)
  - English: Siberian Transfer, translation by John Brownjohn (1992)
- Die Belmonts. Roman einer Bankiersfamilie (1992) (a.k.a. Das Gesetz der Belmonts)
- Das Erbe (1996)
