= Sticciano =

- Frazione
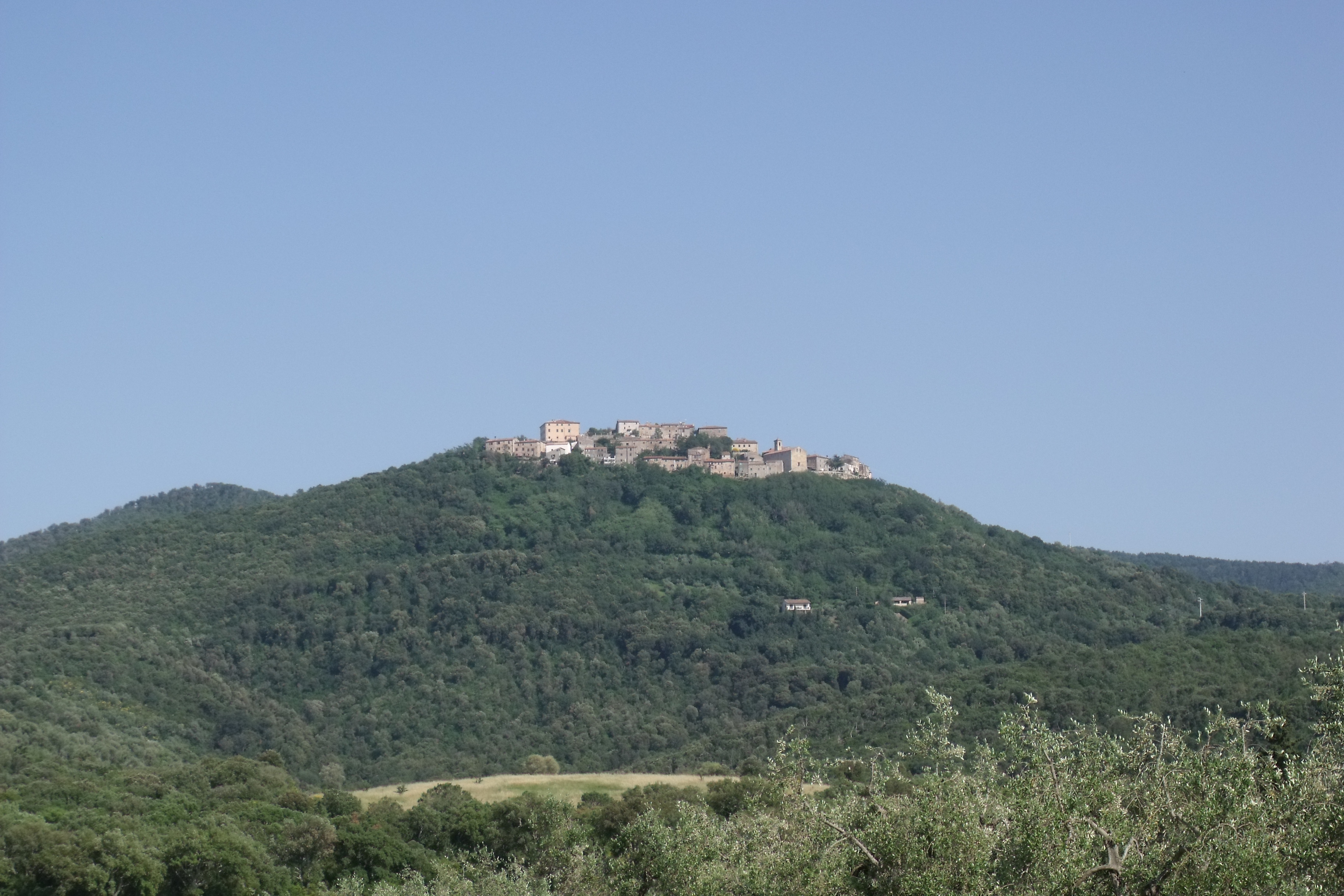
- View of Sticciano

- Location of Sticciano in Italy
- Coordinates: 42°55′22″N 11°8′34″E
- Country: Italy
- Region: Tuscany
- Province: Grosseto (GR)
- Comune: Roccastrada
- Elevation: 303 m (994 ft)

Population (2011)
  - Total: 727
- Demonym: Sticcianesi
- Time zone: UTC+1 (CET)
  - Summer (DST): UTC+2 (CEST)
- Postal code: 58028
- Dialing code: (+39) 0564

Sticciano is a village in Tuscany, central Italy, administratively a frazione of the comune of Roccastrada, province of Grosseto. At the time of the 2001 census its population amounted to 686.

Sticciano is situated about 24 km from Grosseto and 15 km from Roccastrada and it is easily reached from the Siena-Grosseto railway thanks to its own station, situated in the lower hamlet of Sticciano Scalo.

It is composed by two hamlets, Sticciano Alto, where it is situated the ancient castle, and Sticciano Scalo, the modern neighbourhood next to the train station.

== Main sights ==
- Santa Mustiola, or Santissima Concezione (10th century), main parish church of the village.
- Church of Confraternita del Sacro Cuore di Gesù (16th century), now transformed.
- Maria Santissima (20th century), modern parish church of the hamlet of Sticciano Scalo.
- Sant'Antonio Abate (20th century), modern parish church in the Olmini rural area around Sticciano.
- Palazzo Piccolomini, medieval building in the old town.
- Villa Tolomei, a former farmhouse of late 19th century.

== Transports ==
- Sticciano railway station

== Sources ==
- Aldo Mazzolai, Guida della Maremma. Percorsi tra arte e natura, Le Lettere, Florence, 1997.
- Giuseppe Guerrini, Torri e castelli della Provincia di Grosseto, Nuova Immagine Editrice, Siena, 1999.

== See also ==
- Montemassi
- Piloni
- Ribolla
- Roccatederighi
- Sassofortino
- Torniella
