= Torniella =

- Frazione
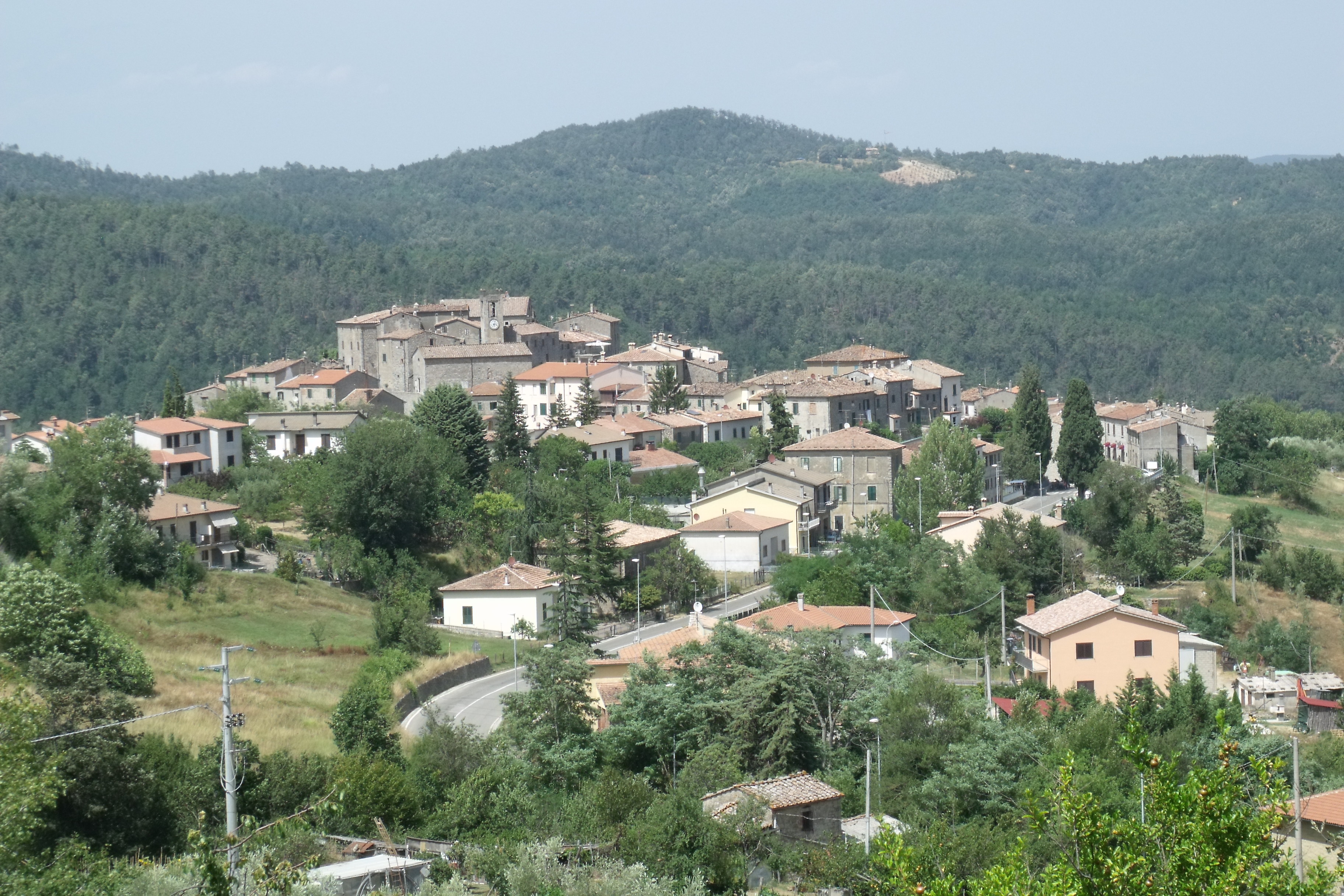
- View of Torniella

- Location of Torniella in Italy
- Coordinates: 43°4′26″N 11°9′14″E
- Country: Italy
- Region: Tuscany
- Province: Grosseto (GR)
- Comune: Roccastrada
- Elevation: 441 m (1,447 ft)

Population (2011)
  - Total: 294
- Demonym: Torniellini
- Time zone: UTC+1 (CET)
  - Summer (DST): UTC+2 (CEST)
- Postal code: 58036
- Dialing code: (+39) 0564

Torniella is a village in Tuscany, central Italy, administratively a frazione of the comune of Roccastrada, province of Grosseto. At the time of the 2001 census its population amounted to 323.

Torniella is about 46 km from Grosseto and 10 km from Roccastrada, and it is situated in the heart of La Pietra and Farma nature reserves.

== Main sights ==
- San Giovanni Battista (14th century), main parish church of the village.
- Church of Immacolata Concezione, or Santi Fabiano e Sebastiano (17th century).
- Walls of Torniella, old fortifications which surround the village since 11th century.

== Bibliography ==
- Aldo Mazzolai, Guida della Maremma. Percorsi tra arte e natura, Le Lettere, Florence, 1997.

== See also ==
- Montemassi
- Piloni
- Ribolla
- Roccatederighi
- Sassofortino
- Sticciano
