= Montemassi =

- Frazione
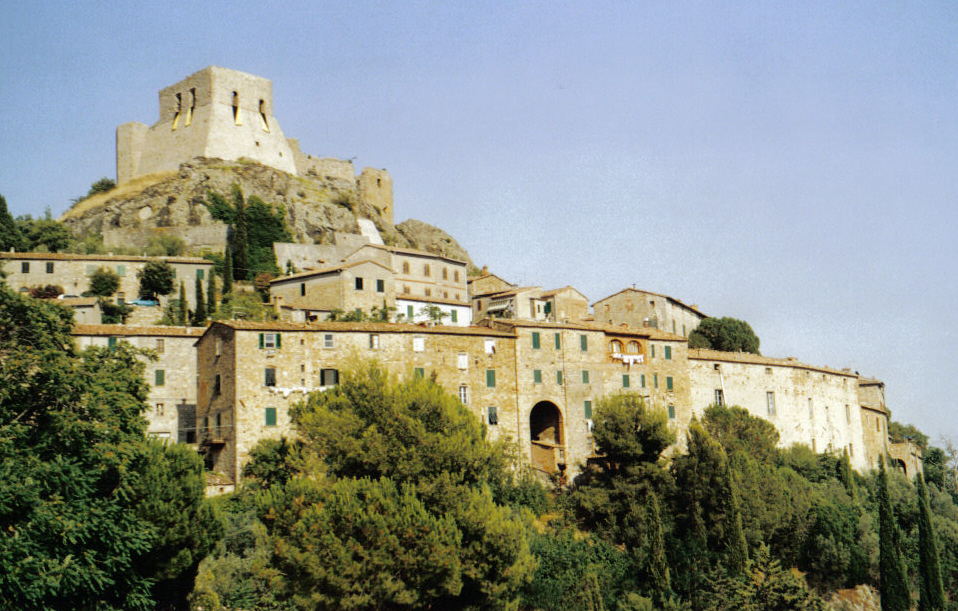
- View of Montemassi

- Location of Montemassi in Italy
- Coordinates: 42°59′32.78″N 11°03′50.00″E
- Country: Italy
- Region: Tuscany
- Province: Grosseto (GR)
- Comune: Roccastrada
- Elevation: 280 m (920 ft)

Population (2011)
  - Total: 188
- Demonym: Montemassini
- Time zone: UTC+1 (CET)
  - Summer (DST): UTC+2 (CEST)
- Postal code: 58020
- Dialing code: (+39) 0564

Montemassi is a village in Tuscany, central Italy, administratively part of the comune of Roccastrada, in the province of Grosseto. It is located on a hill about 140 m (460 ft) above sea level.

The village originated as a fortified village of the Aldobrandeschi family. The Republic of Siena conquered it in the mid-13th century, but in the following century it was held by the Pannocchieschi and the Cappucciani of Sticciano families. In 1328 it was conquered by the condottiero Guidoriccio da Fogliano, fighting for Siena; the event is depicted in a famous fresco in the Palazzo Pubblico of Siena.

In the mid-16th century it became part of the Grand Duchy of Tuscany, following its history thenceforth.

It features a large polygonal rocca and a line of walls.

== Bibliography ==
- Mazzolai, Aldo (1997). Guida della Maremma. Percorsi tra arte e natura. Florence: Le Lettere.

== See also ==
- Piloni
- Ribolla
- Roccatederighi
- Sassofortino
- Sticciano
- Torniella
