= Roccastrada railway station =

Railway station in Italy

Roccastrada
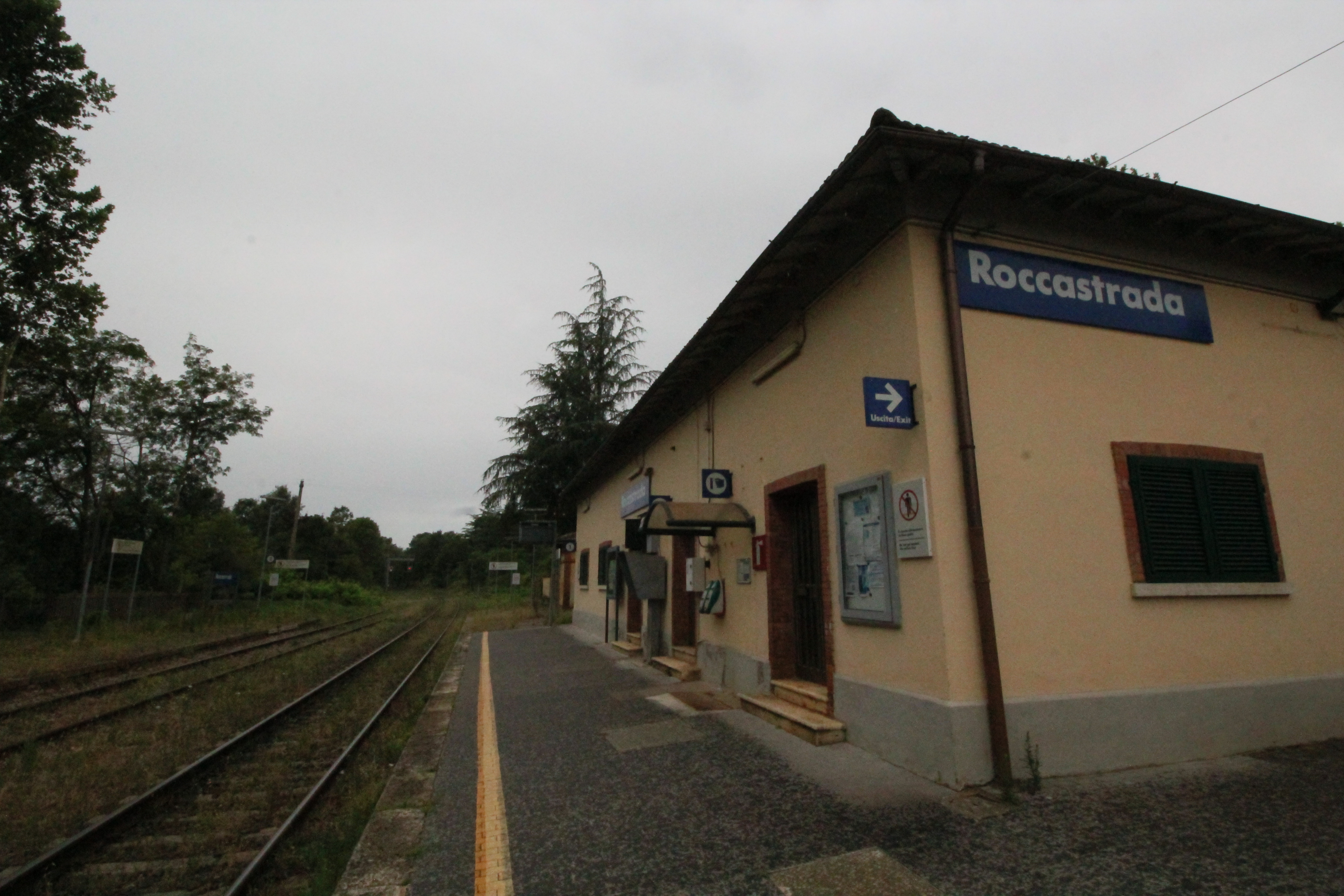

General information
- Location: Via della Stazione; Roccastrada, Grosseto, Tuscany; Italy
- Coordinates: 42°57′27.87″N 11°11′34.77″E
- Operator: Rete Ferroviaria Italiana; Trenitalia
- Line: Siena–Grosseto
- Tracks: 1

Other information
- Classification: Bronze

History
- Opened: 1872; 154 years ago
Location
- Location within Tuscany Location within Italy

Roccastrada railway station is an Italian railway station on the Siena–Grosseto railway line, located in Roccastrada, Province of Grosseto, Tuscany.

== History ==
The station was inaugurated in 1872. The designated location for the station's opening was I Palazzi, situated seven kilometers from the center of Roccastrada.

== Train services and movements ==
Regular passenger services to the station consist of regionale and regionale veloce services, which run to Grosseto, Siena, and Florence SMN.

== See also ==
- History of rail transport in Italy
- List of railway stations in Tuscany
- Rail transport in Italy
- Railway stations in Italy
