= Guidoriccio da Fogliano =

Italian condottiero

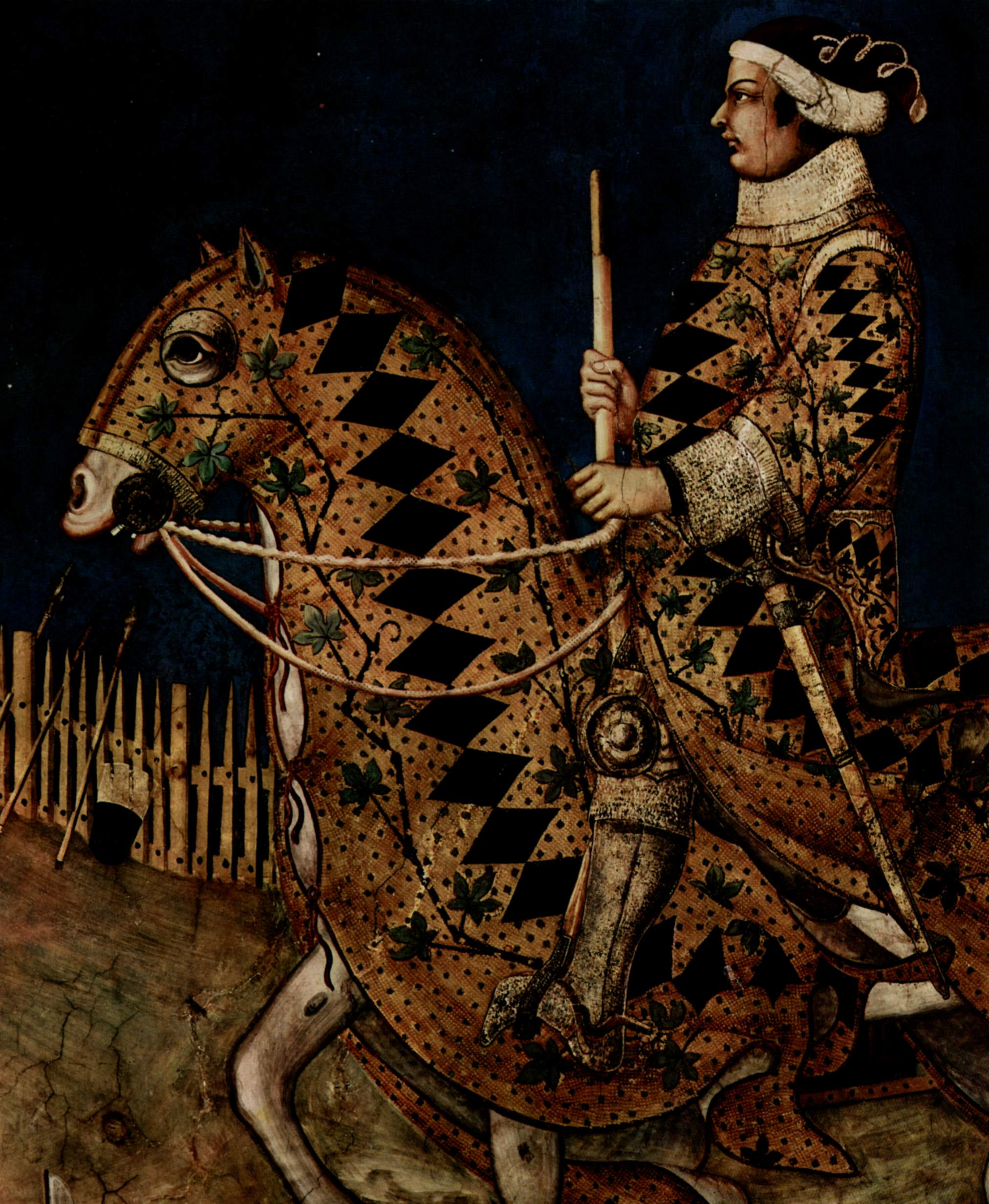
Guidoriccio da Fogliano in the fresco Siege of Montemassi by Simone Martini.

Guidoriccio da Fogliano (c. 1290 - 16 June 1352) was an Italian condottiero. He is known as being portrayed by Simone Martini in the fresco of the Palazzo Pubblico at Siena.

== Biography ==
Guidoriccio was the son of Niccolò da Fogliano, condottiero and lord of Reggio di Lombardia (current Reggio Emilia). In 1327 he was hired by the Republic of Siena to attack the possessions of the rival Pisa and the Aldobrandeschi in the Maremma and Mount Amiata areas. In July 1328, with an army of 900 cavalry and 6,000 infantry, he besieged the village of Montemassi defended by Castruccio Castracani, conquering it after seven months. He also captured the Castle of Sassoforte. In 1331 Guidoriccio also took Scansano, Arcidosso and Massa Marittima and, the following year, he defeated the Pisani at Giuncarico.

However, in 1333 he was expelled by the Sienese, and he took refuge in Reggio where, together with his brother Giberto, he ousted Azzo Manfredi. Two years later the city was conquered by the Gonzaga, and the two brothers moved to Veneto, where, in 1337, Guidoriccio became podestà of Padua. He also fought under Mastino I della Scala. In 1348 he became podestà of Verona and, in 1351, he could return to Siena, where he died in 1352. He was buried in the church of San Domenico.

== Sources ==
- Golinelli, Paolo (1997). "Guidoriccio da Fogliano". Dizionario Biografico degli Italiani. Vol. 48. Rome: Istituto per l'Enciclopedia Italiana.
