= Roccastrada =

- Comune
- Comune di Roccastrada
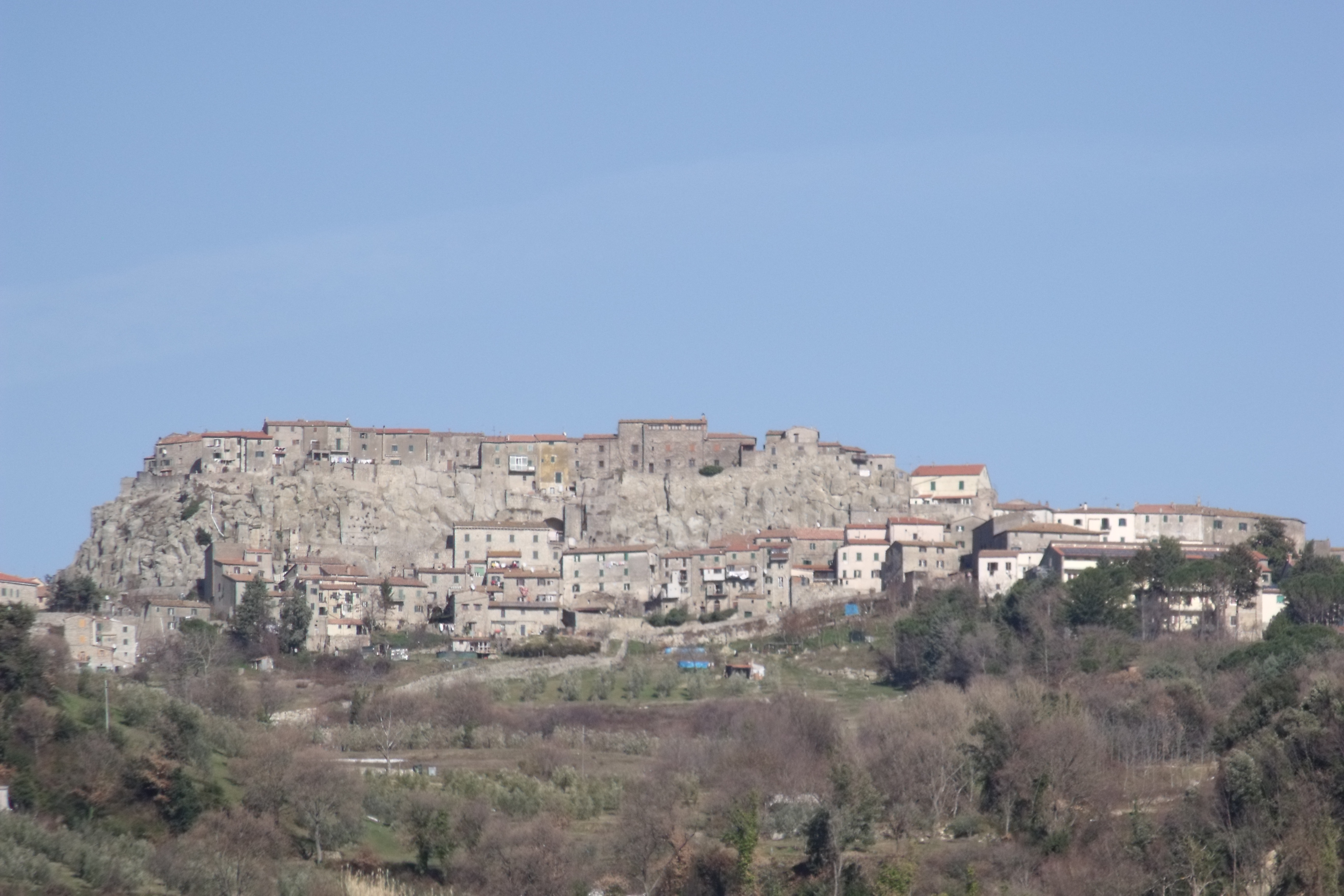
- Panorama of Roccastrada

- Coat of arms

- Location within Italy Location within Tuscany
- Coordinates: 43°0′N 11°10′E
- Country: Italy
- Region: Tuscany
- Province: Grosseto (GR)
- Frazioni: Montemassi, Piloni, Ribolla, Roccatederighi, Sassofortino, Sticciano, Torniella

Government
  - Mayor: Francesco Limatola (Centre-left)

Area
  - Total: 284.47 km^{2} (109.83 sq mi)
- Elevation: 475 m (1,558 ft)

Population (30 August 2020)
  - Total: 8,058
  - Density: 28.33/km^{2} (73.36/sq mi)
- Demonym: Roccastradini
- Time zone: UTC+1 (CET)
  - Summer (DST): UTC+2 (CEST)
- Postal code: 58036
- Dialing code: 0564
- Patron saint: St. Nicholas
- Saint day: 6 December
- Website: Official website

Roccastrada is a comune (municipality) in the Province of Grosseto in the Italian region Tuscany, located about 90 kilometres (56 mi) south of Florence and about 25 kilometres (16 mi) north of Grosseto, between the Maremma plain and the Colline Metallifere.

== History ==
Roccastrada was the scene of a fascist massacre on 24 July 1921, when a squad of blackshirts carried out a punitive expedition against the local population, killing ten civilians and wounding many others.

== Frazioni ==
The municipality is formed by the municipal seat of Roccastrada and the villages (frazioni) of Montemassi, Piloni, Ribolla, Roccatederighi, Sassofortino, Sticciano and Torniella.

== List of mayors ==
Mayor	Term start	Term end	Party
Olinto Bartalucci	1995	1999	Democratic Party of the Left
Leonardo Marras	1999	2009	Democrats of the Left/Democratic Party
Giancarlo Innocenti	2009	2014	Independent (centre-left)
Francesco Limatola	2014	Incumbent	Independent (centre-left)

== Transport ==
- Roccastrada railway station
- Sticciano railway station
