= La vita agra (film) =

- Directed by: Carlo Lizzani
- Written by: Sergio Amidei; Luciano Vincenzoni; Carlo Lizzani; Luciano Bianciardi
- Produced by: E. Nino Krisman
- Starring: Ugo Tognazzi; Giovanna Ralli
- Cinematography: Erico Menczer
- Edited by: Franco Fraticelli
- Music by: Piero Piccioni
- Release date: 1964
- Running time: 100 minutes
- Country: Italy
- Language: Italian

La vita agra is a 1964 Italian film by director Carlo Lizzani, based on Luciano Bianciardi's novel of the same name.

In 2008, the film was included on the Italian Ministry of Cultural Heritage’s 100 Italian films to be saved, a list of 100 films that "have changed the collective memory of the country between 1942 and 1978."

== Plot ==
Luciano Bianchi lives with his wife and son in Guastalla, a small town in northern italy. Left-wing intellectual, he works as the head of cultural initiatives at a mining facility owned by CIS, a large company specializing, among other things, in the production of chemicals, pharmaceuticals, and plastics. Shortly after he was notified of his dismissal by the company, the mine explodes due to an accident caused by the company's poor enforcement of workplace safety measures (repeatedly reported by the miners themselves), resulting in the death of 43 workers.

Luciano then decides to take revenge. With the help of his friend Libero, a miner who survived the accident but was left with a crippled leg, he plans to blow up the company headquarters in Milan, a skyscraper with over 20 floors.

Upon arriving in the chaotic and modernistic Milan, he finds accommodation in a modest boarding house and starts looking for a job to support himself in the meantime. A few days later, just outside a public bathhouse, in the middle of clashes between police and demonstrators from a workers' rally, he encounters Anna, a Roman journalist and member of the Italian Communist Party, who works for a local newspaper. They quickly begin a sort of relationship and soon after, Luciano decides to move in with her, confident that his wife will never find out.

Meanwhile, he begins scouting the skyscraper (in reality, the Torre Galfa). Using the excuse of scheduling a meeting with the company president, he enters the building and is received by the executive’s secretaries, who put him through a selection interview. A few days later, he is contacted and hired on a trial basis. The work, though unclear and seemingly insignificant to him, allows Luciano to conduct more precise reconnaissance of the building. He discovers that, due to the immense system of pipes carrying aviation fuel for the building's heating system, he wouldn’t even need dynamite—just a single match could trigger an explosion. Anna, meanwhile, uncovers his true intentions and, frightened by their potential consequences, tries to dissuade him, urging him to attend communist party section meetings with her.

Dismissed shortly after the trial period, Luciano finds a new, well-paying job as a translator for a prestigious publishing house. Anna helps him by typing under his dictation. They move into a new home together, lodging with a Swiss-German couple obsessed with order and cleanliness. One weekend, Luciano receives a surprise visit from his wife. Despite some awkward moments, he manages to prevent her from discovering his relationship with Anna, but Anna is furious, fearing he might return to his marital home.

Luciano is once again fired, this time due to disagreements with the publishing house over linguistic issues, and he tries his hand in the advertising world as a copywriter. Winning a slogan contest, he joins an agency with an excellent salary. With the security of his new job, he increasingly embraces the comforts of a consumerist lifestyle, purchasing a large apartment and furnishing it lavishly.

Thanks to his creativity, he quickly climbs the career ladder. Eventually, he is contacted again by CIS, his former company, and appointed head of marketing and advertising. Having completely forgotten his original mission, he integrates seamlessly into Milan's upper society, bringing his family to join him and, albeit reluctantly, breaking off with Anna.

Faced with his profound transformation, especially under the betrayed gaze of his friend Libero (who came to deliver his wife and child), Luciano can only reflect somberly, concluding with a dose of irony that the only true economic miracle may have happened in far more distant times, when someone multiplied and distributed bread and fish for free.

== Cast ==
- Ugo Tognazzi as Luciano Bianchi
- Giovanna Ralli as Anna
- Nino Krisman as the Chairman
- Giampiero Albertini as Libero
- Rossana Martini as Mara
- Elio Crovetto as Carlone
- Enzo Jannacci as the ballad singer
- Paola Dapino as Iolanda
- Pippo Starnazza as the librarian
- Maria Pia Arcangeli as the publishing house manager
- Augusto Bonardi as the propagandist
- Antonio Bruno as the police superintendent
- Pupo De Luca as Don Torneri, the priest

Luciano Bianciardi, author of the novel, appeared in a small cameo.
