= Sassofortino =

Subdivision in Tuscany, Italy

- Frazione
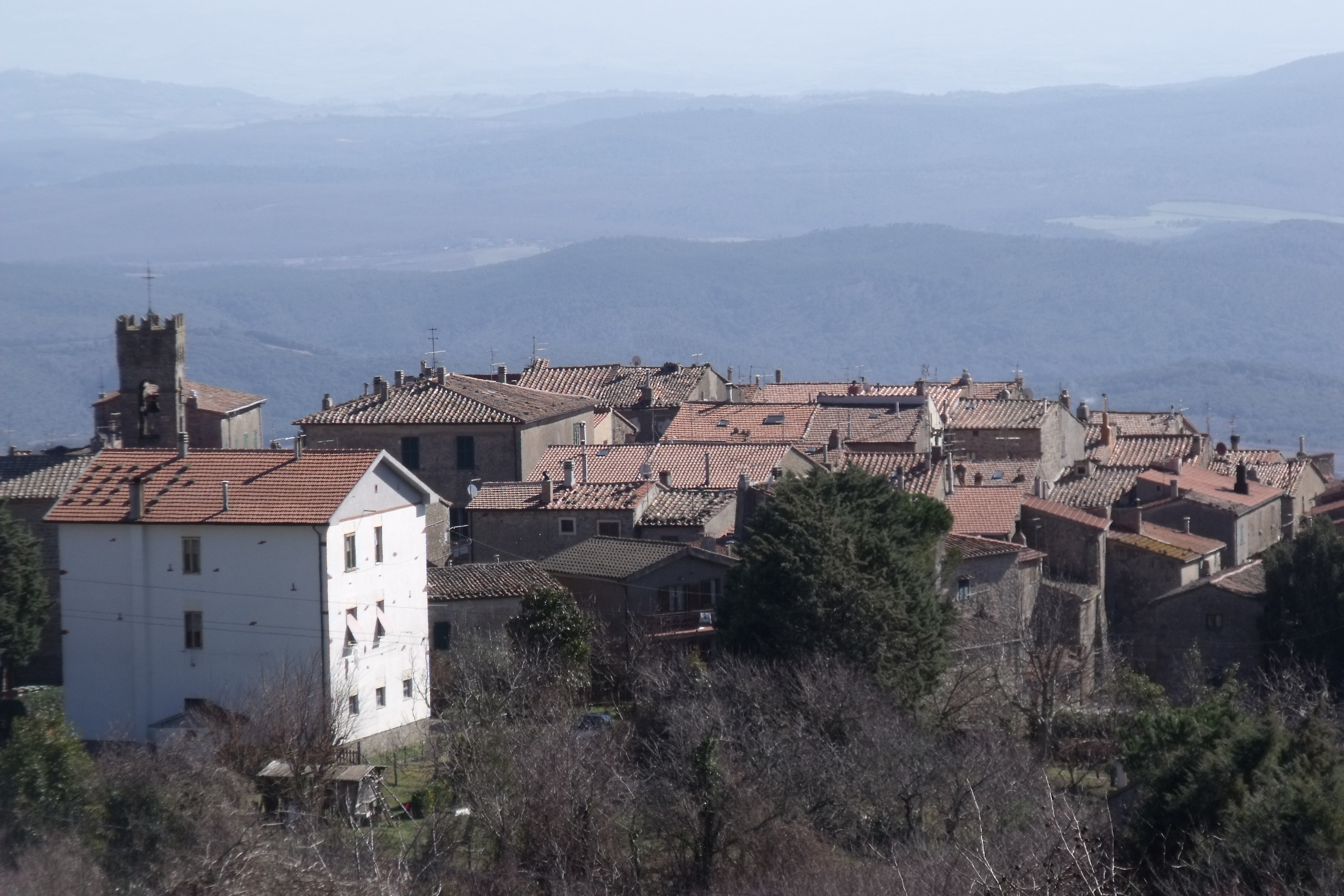
- View of Sassofortino

- Location of Sassofortino in Italy
- Coordinates: 43°1′33″N 11°6′44″E
- Country: Italy
- Region: Tuscany
- Province: Grosseto (GR)
- Comune: Roccastrada
- Elevation: 560 m (1,840 ft)

Population (2011)
  - Total: 748
- Demonym: Sassofortinesi
- Time zone: UTC+1 (CET)
  - Summer (DST): UTC+2 (CEST)
- Postal code: 58036
- Dialing code: (+39) 0564

Sassofortino is a village in Tuscany, central Italy, administratively a frazione of the comune of Roccastrada, province of Grosseto. At the time of the 2001 census its population amounted to 815.

Sassofortino is a hilly medieval village situated about 33 km from Grosseto and 8 km from Roccastrada.

== Main sights ==
- San Michele Arcangelo (14th century), main parish church of the village. It was restructured in 1893.
- Castle of Sassoforte, an 11th-century fortress, now in ruins.

== Sources ==
- Aldo Mazzolai, Guida della Maremma. Percorsi tra arte e natura, Le Lettere, Florence, 1997.
- Giuseppe Guerrini, Torri e castelli della Provincia di Grosseto, Nuova Immagine Editrice, Siena, 1999.

== See also ==
- Montemassi
- Piloni
- Ribolla
- Roccatederighi
- Sticciano
- Torniella
