= La vita agra =

1962 novel by Luciano Bianciardi

La vita agra: or, It’s a Hard Life
- First edition (Italian)
- Author: Luciano Bianciardi
- Original title: La vita agra
- Translator: Eric Mosbacher
- Language: Italian
- Genre: Novel
- Publisher: Rizzoli
- Publication date: 1962
- Publication place: Italy
- English publication date: 1965
- Pages: 200 pp.

La vita agra, known in English-speaking countries as It's a Hard Life, is a novel by Luciano Bianciardi published in 1962 by Rizzoli. It became a best-seller in Italy and it is considered one of the most important novels in contemporary Italian literature.

The novel was also made into a 1964 film of the same name, directed by Carlo Lizzani and starring Ugo Tognazzi and Giovanna Ralli.

== Plot ==
An intellectual moves from a small Tuscan town to the industrial hub of Milan with the secret intention of carrying out an act of rebellion: bombing the headquarters of a mining company responsible for a tragic workplace explosion in his hometown.

Upon arriving in Milan, however, the protagonist becomes ensnared in the daily grind of urban life and the dehumanizing nature of neo-capitalism. His lofty revolutionary goals gradually give way to existential disillusionment as he takes on various writing and translating jobs in an alienating and oppressive corporate culture.

== Reception ==
In 1962, when the novel was released it was praised by the public and the critics. It became a best-seller and was translated into English, French, German and Spanish. Italo Calvino wrote a review in which he regarded the novel positively and compared it to other works of the so-called letteratura industriale (Industrial literature), a current which spread at the beginning of the Italian economic miracle, such as Paolo Volponi's Memoriale and Giovanni Arpino's Una nuvola d'ira. He praised the all-encompassing language that succeeds masterfully in expressing and representing the industrial reality in a more complex way, even if he saw some weaknesses connected to the book's uncontainable autobiography that is limited, in his opinion, to a "private anarchist protest".

== English editions ==
- La vita agra: or, It’s a Hard Life, Hodder & Stoughton, London, 1965; translation by Eric Mosbacher.
- La vita agra. It's a Hard Life, Viking Press, New York, 1965; translation by Eric Mosbacher.
