= Villino Andreini =

Villa in Grosseto, Italy

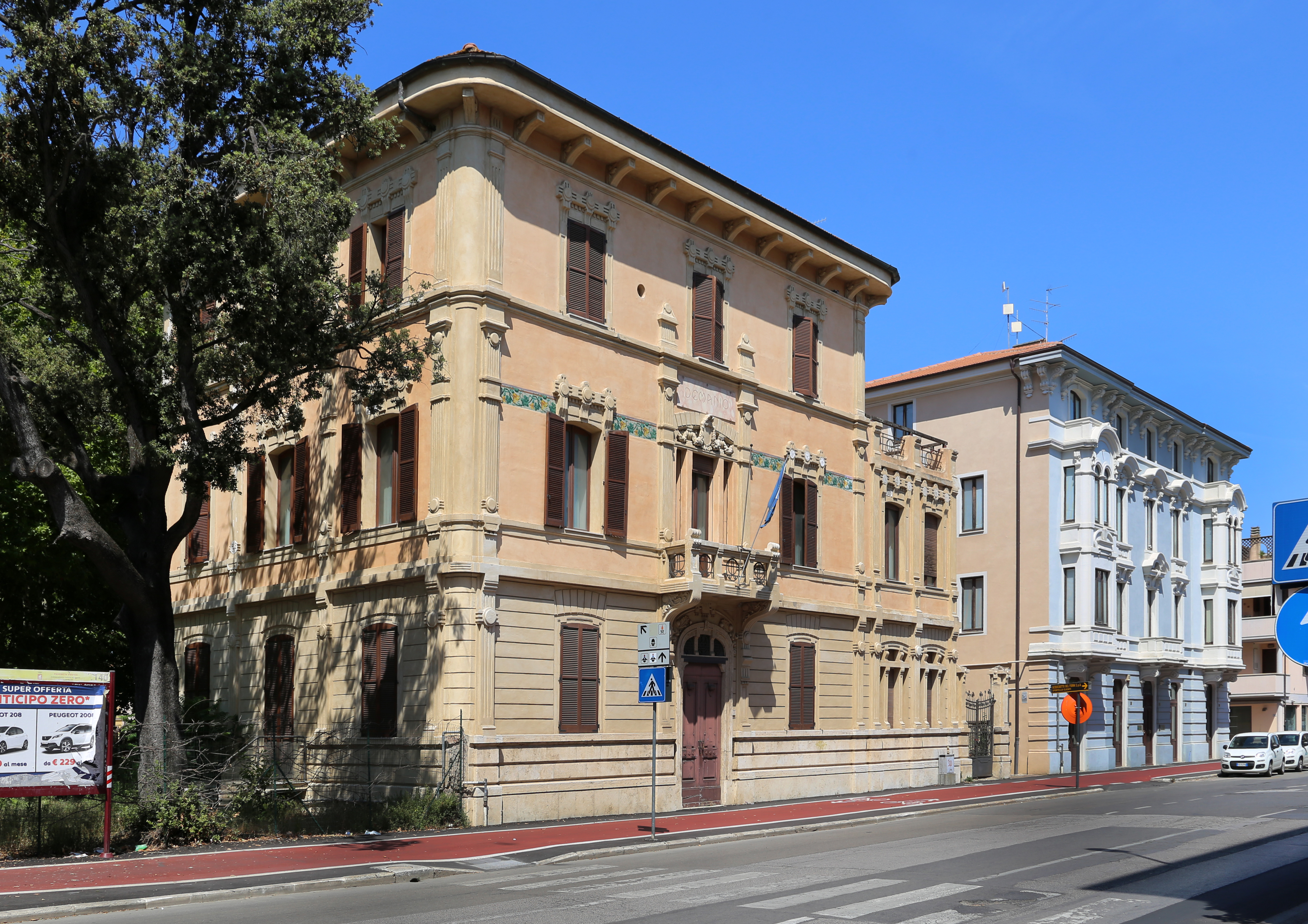
- Interactive map of the Villino Andreini area

General information
- Type: Villa
- Architectural style: Art Nouveau
- Location: Viale Goffredo Mameli 2–4; Grosseto, Tuscany
- Coordinates: 42°45′55″N 11°06′30″E
- Named for: Corrado Andreini
- Completed: 1909
- Client: Corrado Andreini
- Owner: Agenzia del Demanio

Technical details
- Floor count: 3

Design and construction
- Architect: Corrado Andreini

Villino Andreini is an Art Nouveau villa in Grosseto, Italy. It is located on Viale Goffredo Mameli, the street leading from the historic center to the railway station, and was designed by the architect-engineer Corrado Andreini in 1909 as his own personal residence.

== History ==
The villa was constructed in 1909 as a private residence for the engineer-architect Corrado Andreini, who was the director of the School of Arts and Crafts in Grosseto and a notable local figure in early 20th-century eclecticism and Art Nouveau. He was also the architect behind the project.

This building was the first "prestigious" construction for the bourgeoisie along Viale della Stazione (later renamed Viale Mameli) in the suburb of Porta Nuova, an area designated for major urban expansion in the city's first master plan, which was drafted by Andreini himself in that same year and approved by the municipality in 1912. Viale della Stazione was intended as a prominent representative thoroughfare, serving as the primary access to the historic city center. Andreini also designed the adjacent Palazzina Tempesti in 1913.

In 1926, the villa lost its residential function and was repurposed as the headquarters for the Royal Inspectorate of Maremma Toscana. For this new role, an additional floor was added based on a design by Corrado Costa, without altering the original style. The property has since remained under State ownership.

== Description ==
The building features a main block with three stories, capped by an overhanging cornice supported by prominent brackets, and an adjacent two-story wing with a terrace bordered by a decorative balustrade.

The facade on Viale Mameli and the left side elevation display distinctive Art Nouveau-style decorations, including fluted pilasters, rounded corners, and ornamental patterns with vegetal, floral, and geometric elements, along with zoomorphic figures, masks, and garlands. The entrance door is crowned by a central balcony, above which is an inscription reading "DEMANIO". The ground floor is clad in travertine with horizontal bands. Noteworthy details include the decorative cornice bands, the side terrace with wrought-iron railings, and especially the cornice above the first-floor window lintels, which is adorned with painted majolica tiles featuring vine motifs.

The interior still features the original entrance hall with a terrazzo floor, the central staircase, and an ornately decorated wooden door with intricate scrollwork, stained glass, and wrought iron details.

== Critical reception ==
Quattrocchi (2006) described the building as "the finest example of Liberty style in Maremma", noting that "while the overall volumetric design is quite conventional, it is enlivened by the decorative treatment of the main block and the adjacent single-story extension. This treatment employs a language that blends vegetal and geometric motifs, reminiscent of secessionist models, and Andreini demonstrates a skillful and confident command of this style".

== Bibliography ==
- Grosseto fuori Porta Nuova. Lo sviluppo di Grosseto a nord delle mura dalla metà dell'Ottocento al secondo dopoguerra. Grosseto: Innocenti Editore. 2009.
- Cappellini, Perla; Dominici, Laura (2004). Le stagioni del liberty in Toscana. Itinerari tra il 1880 e il 1930. Spoleto: Del Gallo Editore.
- Letizia Franchina, ed. (1995). Tra Ottocento e Novecento. Grosseto e la Maremma alla ricerca di una nuova immagine. Soprintendenza per i beni ambientali e architettonici per le province di Siena e Grosseto.
- Innocenti, Mario; Innocenti, Elena (1993). Grosseto:briciole di storia. Cartoline e documenti d'epoca 1899-1944. Grosseto: Innocenti Editore. pp. 211–213.
- Mariagrazia Celuzza; Mauro Papa, eds. (2013). Grosseto visibile. Guida alla città e alla sua arte pubblica. Arcidosso: Edizioni Effigi.
- Enrico Crispolti; Anna Mazzanti; Luca Quattrocchi, eds. (2005). Arte in Maremma nella prima metà del Novecento. Milano: Silvana Editoriale.
- Maria Adriana Giusti, ed. (1996). Le età del Liberty in Toscana. Florence: Octavo-Franco Cantini Editore.
