= Ivo Faenzi =

Italian politician (born 1932)

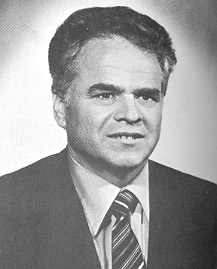

Member of the Chamber of Deputies
- In office 25 May 1972 – 11 July 1983

Personal details
- Born: 19 April 1932 (age 94) Grosseto, Kingdom of Italy
- Party: Italian Communist Party

Ivo Faenzi (born 19 April 1932) is an Italian politician who served as a deputy for three legislatures from 1972 to 1983.

== Life and career ==
An official of the Italian Communist Party in Grosseto, he served as secretary of the PCI’s Grosseto provincial federation from 1967 to 1971.

He was elected to the Chamber of Deputies for three consecutive terms (VI, VII, VIII) from 1972 to 1983, and also served as secretary of the Second Committee on Prime Ministerial Affairs, Internal Affairs, Religious Affairs, and Public Entities from 1976 to 1979. He concluded his parliamentary term in 1983.
