= Etrusco Benci =

Italian partisan (1905–1943)

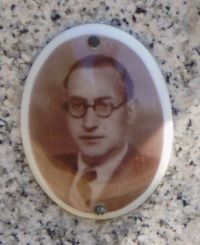
- Born: 25 June 1905; Grosseto, Kingdom of Italy
- Died: 12 June 1943 (aged 37); Brussels, Belgium
- Occupation: Typographer
- Political party: Italian Republican Party; Italian Communist Party

Etrusco Benci (25 June 1905 – 12 June 1943) was an Italian anti-fascist typographer who fought in the Spanish Civil War and was active in the French and Belgian Resistance.

== Life ==
Republican activist and professional typographer, in 1935 Benci clandestinely emigrated to France. In Nice, where he had found work, he joined the Communist Party and, at the outbreak of the Spanish Civil War, was among the first to rush to the nearby Republic, where he enlisted in the anarchist formations of the POUM. Wounded in Zaragoza and decorated for his bravery, Benci returned to France after Franco's victory. French authorities interned him at Gurs, but he managed to escape from the camp at the beginning of World War II. With the German occupation, Benci participated in the resistance movement alongside French fighters. He then moved to Belgium to continue guerrilla activities against the Germans. Captured by the Nazis along with two hundred other Belgian partisans in February 1943, Benci was executed by firing squad on 12 June 1943.

== Commemorations ==
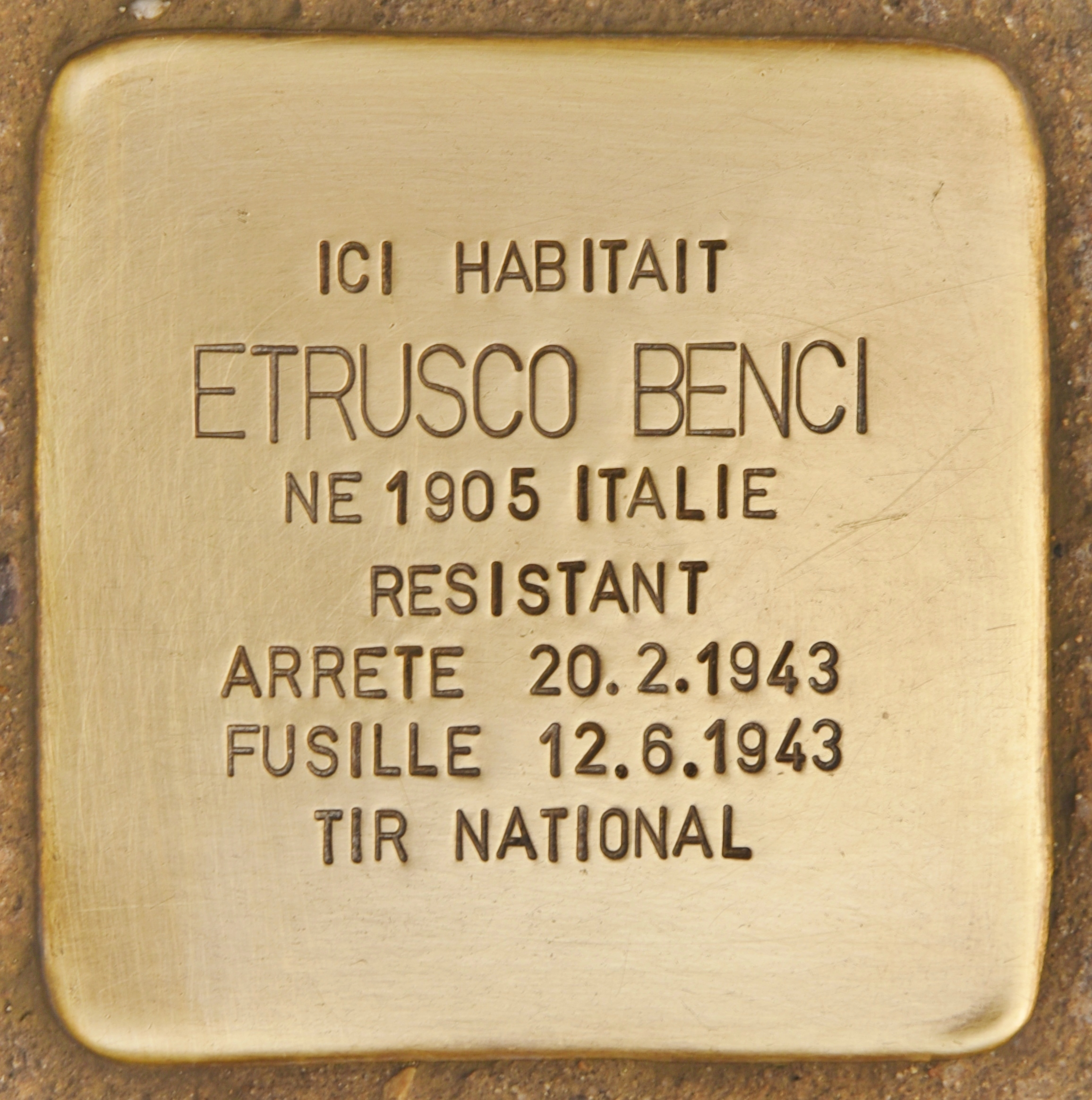
Stolperstein in Molenbeek

Etrusco Benci is buried in the Enclosure of the executed, a cemetery for Resistance fallen in Brussels located in the municipality of Schaerbeek. In November 2018, a Stolperstein was placed in his memory at his residence at 10 Rue de la Perle in Molenbeek.

In Grosseto, a square within the city's school district has been dedicated to him. Benci is also remembered together with Albo Bellucci and Giuseppe Scopetani with a plaster bas-relief, created by Tolomeo Faccendi, located in the atrium of the Town Hall.

== Sources ==
- Ilaria Cansella; Francesco Cecchetti, eds. (2012). Volontari antifascisti toscani nella guerra civile spagnola. Arcidosso: Effigi.
- José Gotovitch (1992). Du rouge au tricolore. Les communistes belges de 1939 à 1944 : un aspect de l'histoire de la Résistance en Belgique. Charleroi: Editions Labor.
- Pia Leonetti Carena (1966). Gli italiani del maquis. Cino Del Duca.
- Anne Morelli (2004). Gli italiani del Belgio. Storia e storie di due secoli di migrazioni. Foligno: Editoriale Umbra.
