= San Pietro, Grosseto =

San Pietro
- Church of Saint Peter
- Chiesa di San Pietro (Italian)
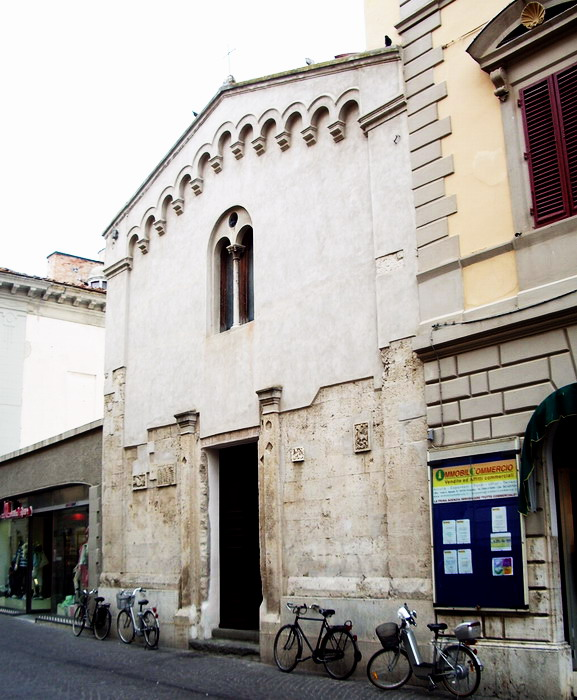
- San Pietro
- 42°45′42.57″N 11°06′46.86″E
- Location: Grosseto, Tuscany
- Address: Corso Carducci
- Country: Italy
- Denomination: Roman Catholic; Romanian Orthodox

History
- Status: Filial church

Architecture
- Architectural type: Church
- Style: Romanesque
- Groundbreaking: 9th century
- Completed: 13th century

Administration
- Diocese: Diocese of Grosseto

San Pietro is a small, medieval, Romanesque style, Roman Catholic church in the comune of Grosseto, Tuscany.

The first documentation of a church at the site dates to 1188. Recent restorations have found structural elements dating to the 9th century. Of the Romanesque elements remaining are four sculpted panels with figures, animals, and decoration. The interior contains a Gothic inscription from 1235, recalling the consecration under the conte Ildebrandino Aldobrandeschi. A 17th-century crucifix has been placed inside deriving from a church in Grancia.

The church was restored in 2005 and since 2010 has been also officiated by the Romanian Orthodox Church.

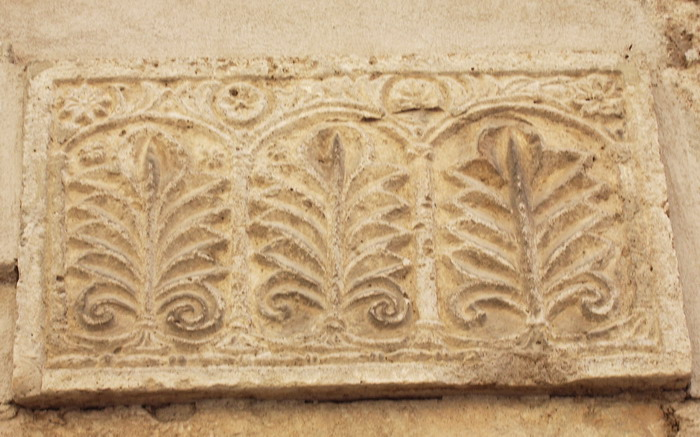

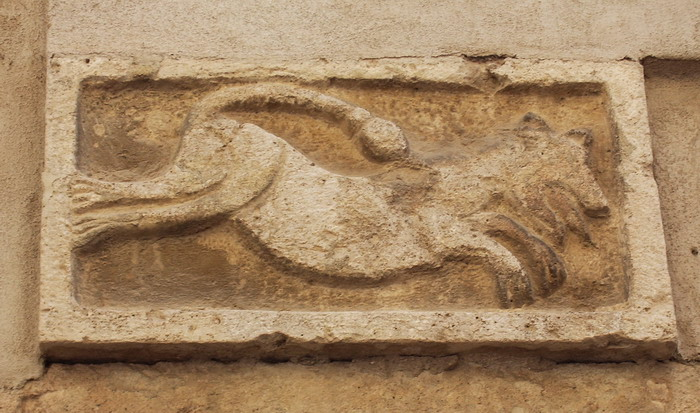

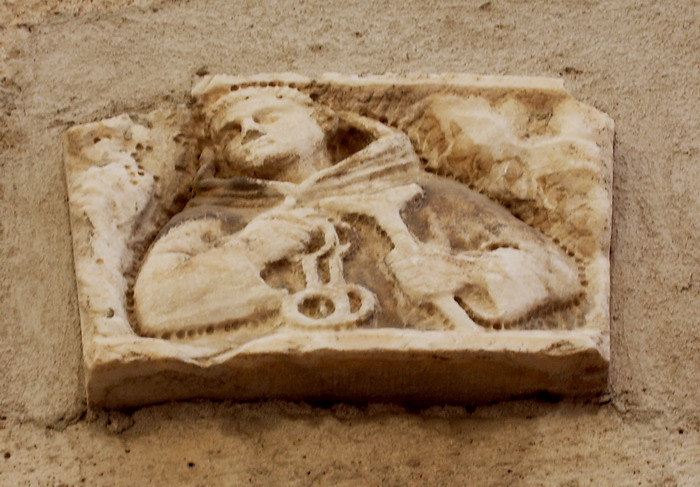

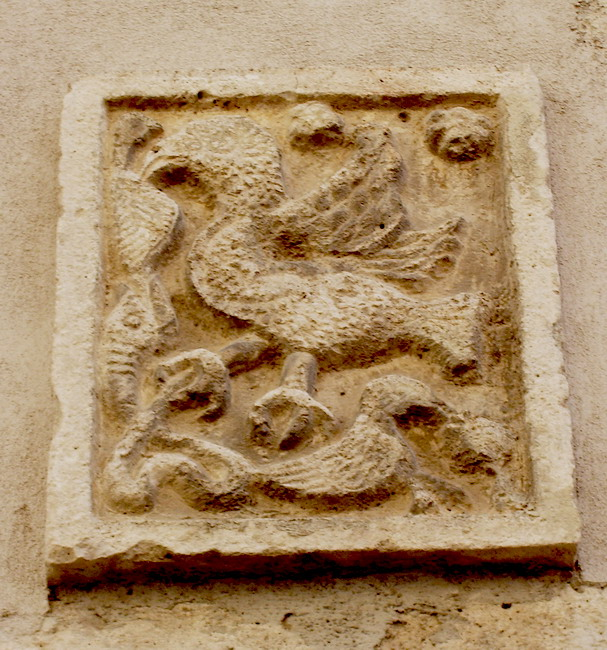
