= Cinema Marraccini =

Former cinema in Grosseto, Italy

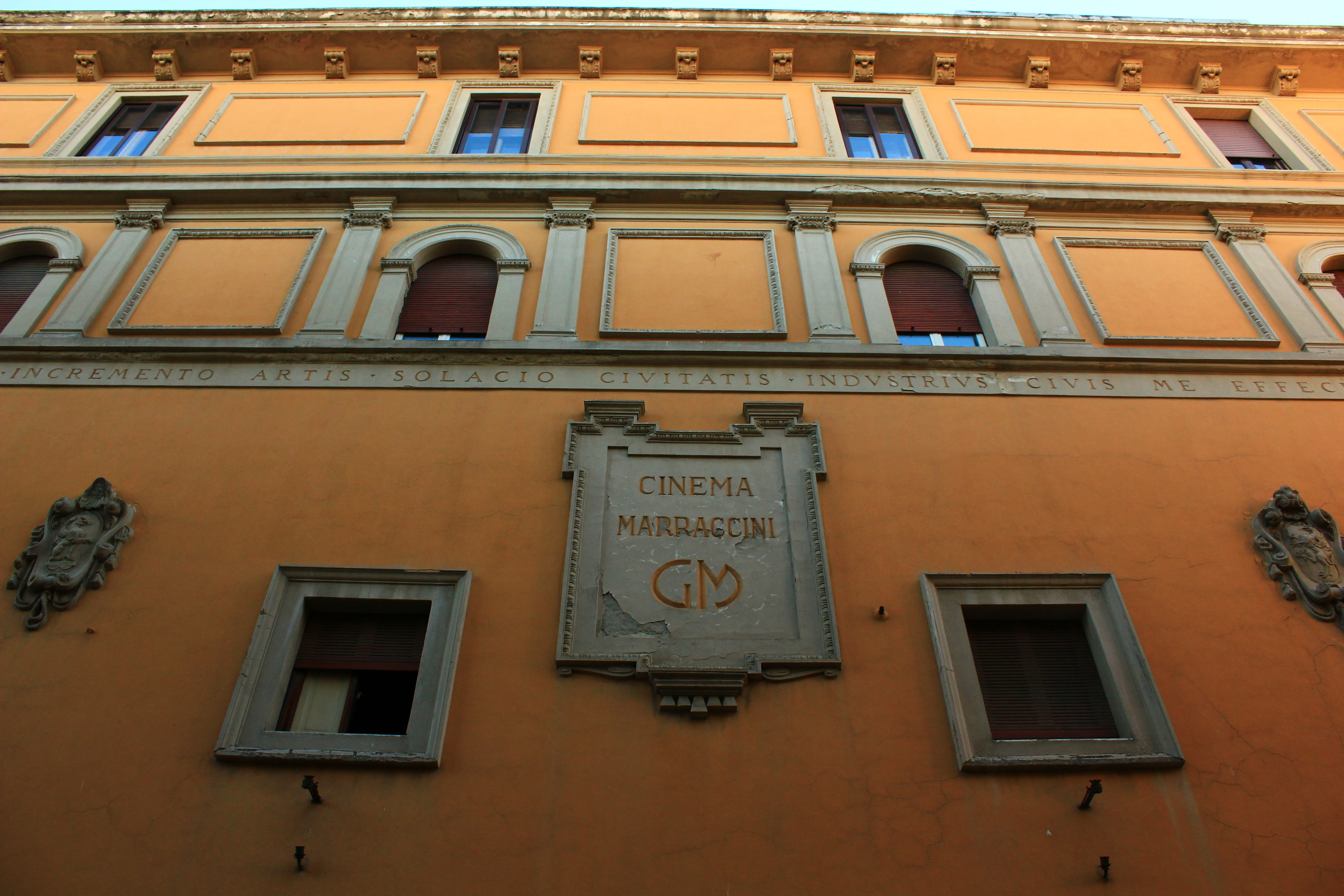
- Interactive map of the Cinema Marraccini area

General information
- Type: Movie theater
- Architectural style: Historicism
- Location: Via Giuseppe Mazzini 155–159; Grosseto, Tuscany
- Coordinates: 42°45′32.7″N 11°06′48.5″E
- Named for: Giovanni Marraccini
- Construction started: 1925
- Completed: 1926
- Inaugurated: 11 October 1926; 99 years ago
- Client: Giovanni Marraccini
- Owner: Municipality of Grosseto

Design and construction
- Architect: Renato Della Rocca

The Cinema Marraccini is a former movie theater located in the historic center of Grosseto, in Tuscany.

The building is located along the southwestern side of Via Mazzini, leaning against the walkway of the Medici walls in front of the arch that connects to Piazza Dante. It was built in 1926 on the site of Grosseto's first cinema, the "Splendor" owned by Guido Lumachi, with a design by Renato Della Rocca. Initially named "Cinema Savoia", it was later named after his owner Giovanni Marraccini at the end of World War II.

The cinema remained active until its last screening in October 2003. Since then, the structure has remained abandoned for twenty years. In 2022, it was purchased by the Municipality of Grosseto.

== History ==
A first movie theater was established on Via Mazzini in 1907, by Guido Lumachi, a photographer and pioneer of cinematography in Grosseto, who had organized the first screenings at the Teatro degli Industri. The "Cinema Splendor" was inaugurated on 2 November 1907, and was managed by the Società Esercizio Teatri e Cinematografi of Livorno, whose director, Virginio Milanese, ordered expansion work and equipped it with a stage, reopening it in 1913.

At the end of World War I, Lumachi sold the business to Giovanni Marraccini (1886–1965), who planned the construction of a monumental building to replace the "Splendor", entrusting the project to the Roman engineer Renato Della Rocca. The works, which began in 1925, were completed the following year, and the new "Cinema Savoia" was inaugurated on 11 October 1926. The structure was notable for the time, featuring reinforced concrete and a skylight on the roof that allowed for ventilation and a regular air exchange in the hall.

Initially used as both a cinema and a theater, the building was renovated and designated exclusively for screenings in the years immediately following the end of World War II, with the removal of the stage. On that occasion, the cinema took the name of its owner, Marraccini. Another renovation occurred in 1973, designed by Bruno Pedotti, when an air conditioning system was installed and the skylight was removed.

The cinema remained active throughout the 20th century and closed permanently on the evening of 8 October 2003, after the screening of the last film on the program, The Miracle by Edoardo Winspeare.

After nearly twenty years of abandonment, the building was purchased at auction by the Municipality of Grosseto on 25 October 2022.

== Bibliography ==
- Mariagrazia Celuzza; Mauro Papa, eds. (2013). Grosseto visibile. Guida alla città e alla sua arte pubblica. Arcidosso: Edizioni Effigi.
- Enrico Crispolti; Anna Mazzanti; Luca Quattrocchi, eds. (2006). Arte in Maremma nella prima metà del Novecento. Milan: Silvana Editoriale.
- Letizia Franchina, ed. (1995). Tra Ottocento e Novecento. Grosseto e la Maremma alla ricerca di una nuova immagine. Soprintendenza per i beni ambientali e architettonici per le province di Siena e Grosseto.
- Innocenti, Mario; Innocenti, Elena (1993). Grosseto:briciole di storia. Cartoline e documenti d'epoca 1899-1944. Grosseto: Innocenti Editore.
- Mario Innocenti; Sara Goi; Emanuele Turbanti (2009). Il «Pidocchino» e gli altri cinema di Grosseto: briciole di storia. Grosseto: Editrice Innocenti.
