= Orsola Cozzi =

Italian novelist (1788–1831)

- Born: 20 June 1788; Grosseto, Grand Duchy of Tuscany
- Died: 1831 (aged 42–43); Pisa, Grand Duchy of Tuscany
- Occupation: Writer

Orsola Cozzi (20 June 1788 – 1831) was an Italian nun and writer. She was a pioneer of the sentimental novel in 19th-century Tuscany and has also been recognized as the first Italian woman novelist.

== Life and career ==
Born in Grosseto in 1788, a nun, she was an author of sentimental novels in the early decades of the 19th century. Cozzi adopted a popular style, far from the rigid conventions of Italian literary tradition and mainly influenced by trends from abroad, such as the epistolary form. Her novels favored happy endings, plot twists, and misunderstandings, while also making attempts to explore the psychology of the characters, as seen in Melinda, L'orfana infelice, and Lo specchio morale.

In 1818, Cozzi published the historical-allegorical novel Le avventure di Adullio di Roselle.

== Works ==
- Il mausoleo (1816)
- Melinda, o le stravaganze della sorte (1816)
- L'orfana infelice, ovvero le avventure della contessa N. N. (1816)
- Lo specchio morale. Lettere (1817)
- Le avventure di Adullio di Roselle (1818)

== Sources ==
- Pietro Leopoldo Ferri (1842). Biblioteca femminile italiana. Crescini. pp. 138–139.
- Giovanni Laini (1959). Il romanticismo europeo. Vol. 1. Vallecchi. p. 357.
- Guido Mazzoni, ed. (1934). Storia letteraria d'Italia. L'Ottocento. Vallardi. p. 1030.
- Chiara Silvestri (2019). "I romanzi di Orsola Cozzi, pioniera della narrativa sentimentale ottocentesca". Giornale Storico della Letteratura Italiana. 196 (655): 343–373.
