= Palazzo del Genio Civile =

Building in Grosseto, Italy

- Interactive map of the Palazzo del Genio Civile area

General information
- Type: Public building
- Location: Corso Carducci 48–61; Grosseto, Tuscany
- Coordinates: 42°45′41.2″N 11°06′47.57″E
- Completed: 1911
- Inaugurated: January 1911; 115 years ago

Design and construction
- Architect: Federico Bartolini

The Palazzo del Genio Civile (Civil Engineering Department's Building) is a building in the historic center of Grosseto, Tuscany. It overlooks Corso Carducci, the city's main street and boulevard for strolling and commercial activities. At the rear, the building faces Piazza Baccarini. This rear view differs significantly from the main facade, both in decorative motifs and in the design of the openings, highlighting the distinctiveness of the urban context and its secondary service function.

== History ==
At the beginning of the 20th century, a new location was required for the local offices of the Civil Engineering Department (Genio Civile). This need was addressed by selecting a building on Corso Carducci, originally intended for shops and offices. The building's design and facade were altered by Federico Bartolini, a first-class engineer from the Civil Engineering Department, to meet the new requirements. The building was officially opened in January 1911.

In 1929, the first expansion took place, designed by Corrado Costa. This expansion included the addition of a rear facade that differed stylistically from the original front. Later, in 1952, a fourth floor was added, based on a design by engineer Ramella from the Civil Engineering Department. This new floor, set back from the street line, featured a design that was stylistically consistent with its own period, contrasting sharply with the restrained modernism of the original facade below.

== Description ==
=== Exterior ===
The building features a complex layout and a compact volume, spanning four above-ground floors. It is distinguished by the stylistic differences between its two facades: the more prominent one on Corso Carducci displays a moderately modernist style, while the rear facade, added later, showcases simpler solutions and different material usage.

The main facade is symmetrically arranged with nine openings per floor, and slightly projecting side wings, unified by a stucco surface adorned with ceramic and brick friezes. On the ground floor, nine arched openings accommodate commercial activities, except for the central one, which serves as the main entrance to the offices. The noble floor features three balconies aligned with the central door and the side wings, brick bands and architraves, and a ceramic frieze with Maremma, Etruscan and agrarian symbols, reflecting the building's original purpose. The second floor simplifies these elements and includes a ceramic band with floral motifs between the window arches and the brick cornice. The top floor, set back from the eaves, consists of nine simple windows aligned with those below.

The rear facade, spanning three above-ground floors, is characterized by lintelled windows with travertine and brick surrounds. A horizontal brick band separates the floors, with a brick balustrade on the terrace above.

=== Interior ===
The portal on Corso Carducci opens into a vestibule with a travertine base, leading to the ground floor service areas, including the custodian's apartment and storage rooms. From the vestibule, you enter the main atrium, which features a large arched window overlooking the central courtyard and a staircase with three flights, complete with an iron railing and lamp. This staircase provides access to a peripheral corridor around the stairwell and courtyard, which connects to the offices and secondary corridors on the three upper floors. The Civil Engineering Department offices are located on the first and second floors, while the third floor houses the offices of the Public Works Department and the Chief Engineer's apartment.

== Critical reception ==
In the newspaper L'Ombrone from the time of the inauguration, it was noted: "The building is new, elegant, and sleek; the terracotta decoration, vaguely and variously patterned, is understated and suitable for the environment. The combination of colors is pleasing, and the cornice that beautifully finishes the structure is light and well-designed. Overall, the new building, both respectable and elegant, significantly enhances and adorns our Corso".

Franchina (1995) comments on the "beautiful classic-style facade, marked by arched portals and enriched with painted ceramic friezes that enhance the elegance of the design". Regarding the decorations, Quattrocchi (2006) observes that "in their delightful blend of mythology (the Gorgon and the Chimera, Etruscan-Maremma symbols in the medallions), nature (swamp nymphs, ears of corn, grapes, citrus fruits), and technique (agricultural tools, which the Civil Engineering Department associates with reclaimed land), the ceramic friezes draw more from Arts and Crafts decorative models rather than strictly Art Nouveau style, according to a vibrant naturalism of refined craftsmanship that suggests a non-local production".

== Sources ==
- Mariagrazia Celuzza; Mauro Papa, eds. (2013). Grosseto visibile. Guida alla città e alla sua arte pubblica. Arcidosso: Edizioni Effigi.
- Enrico Crispolti; Anna Mazzanti; Luca Quattrocchi, eds. (2006). Arte in Maremma nella prima metà del Novecento. Milan: Silvana Editoriale.
- Letizia Franchina, ed. (1995). Tra Ottocento e Novecento. Grosseto e la Maremma alla ricerca di una nuova immagine. Siena: Soprintendenza per i beni ambientali e architettonici per le province di Siena e Grosseto.
- Innocenti, Elena; Innocenti, Mario (1993). Grosseto: briciole di storia. Grosseto: Innocenti Editore. pp. 173–178.
- Mazzini, Vanessa (1996). Immagine e arredo urbano a Grosseto. L'asse della città da Piazza Fratelli Rosselli a Piazza De Maria. Grosseto: I Portici.
