= Grosseto =

- Comune
- Città di Grosseto
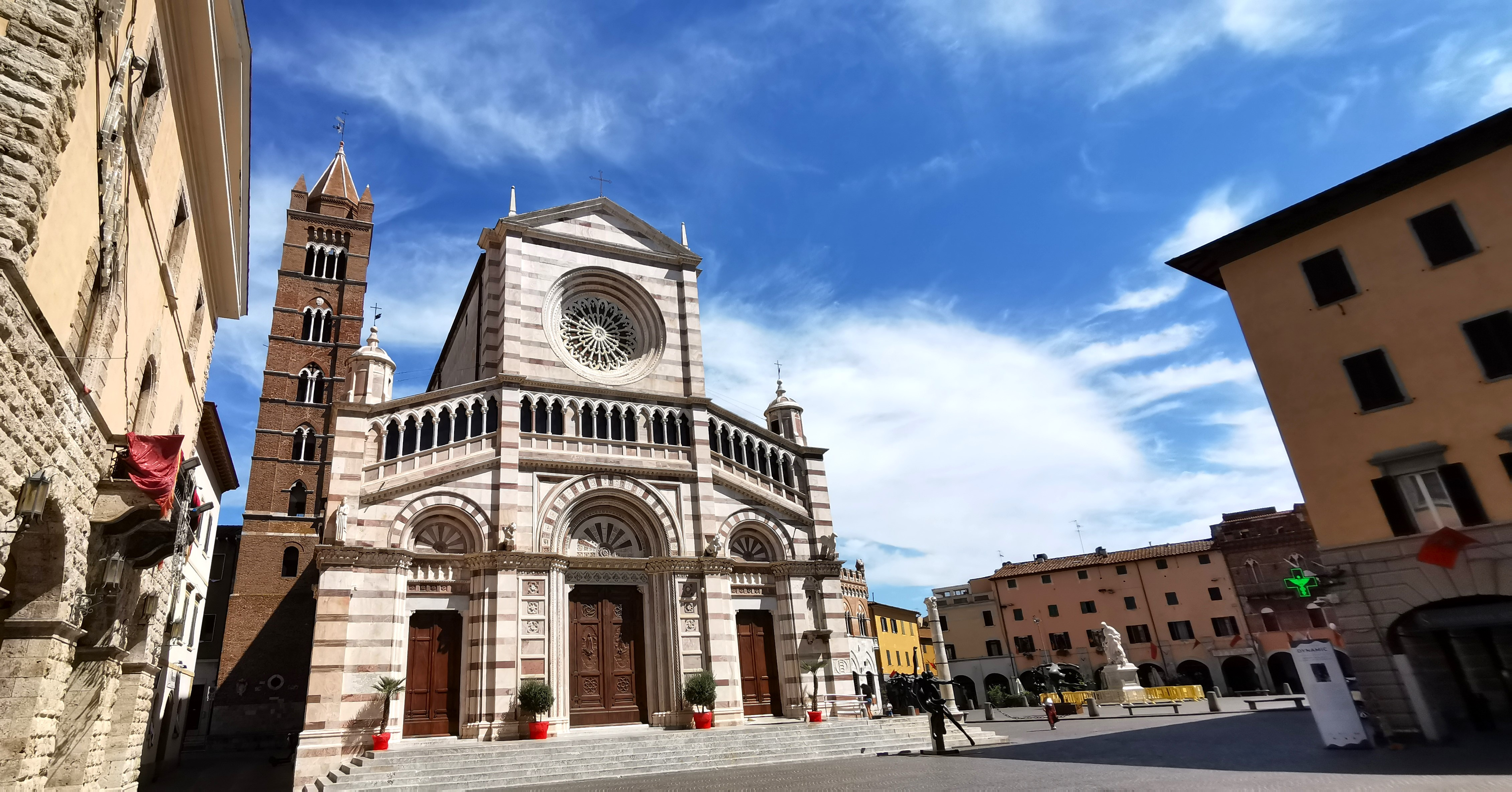

- Flag Coat of arms

- Location within Italy Location within Tuscany
- Coordinates: 42°46′N 11°06′E
- Country: Italy
- Region: Tuscany
- Province: Grosseto (GR)
- Frazioni: Alberese, Batignano, Braccagni, Istia d'Ombrone, Marina di Grosseto, Montepescali, Principina a Mare, Principina Terra, Rispescia, Roselle

Government
  - Mayor: Antonfrancesco Vivarelli Colonna (centre-right independent)

Area
  - Total: 474.46 km^{2} (183.19 sq mi)
- Elevation: 10 m (33 ft)

Population (30 November 2015)
  - Total: 82,131
  - Density: 173.10/km^{2} (448.34/sq mi)
- Demonym: Grossetani
- Time zone: UTC+1 (CET)
  - Summer (DST): UTC+2 (CEST)
- Postal code: 58100
- Dialing code: 0564
- Patron saint: St. Lawrence
- Saint day: 10 August
- Website: Official website

Grosseto (Italian pronunciation: [ɡrosˈseːto]) is a city and a comune in the central Italian region of Tuscany, capital of the province of Grosseto. It is the most populous city of Maremma region and southern Tuscany.

Located at the center of the Maremma region, the city was born on the right bank of the Ombrone river, near the Tyrrhenian Sea. The first center raised in the Middle Ages, following the end of the ancient city of Rusellae. Since the 19th century has had a great economic and demographic development, which makes it an important city for services, agriculture and as a seaside resort.

The comune of Grosseto, with 82,284 inhabitants, includes the frazioni of Marina di Grosseto, Roselle, Principina a Mare, Principina Terra, Montepescali, Braccagni, Istia d'Ombrone, Batignano, Alberese and Rispescia.

== History ==
=== Prehistory ===
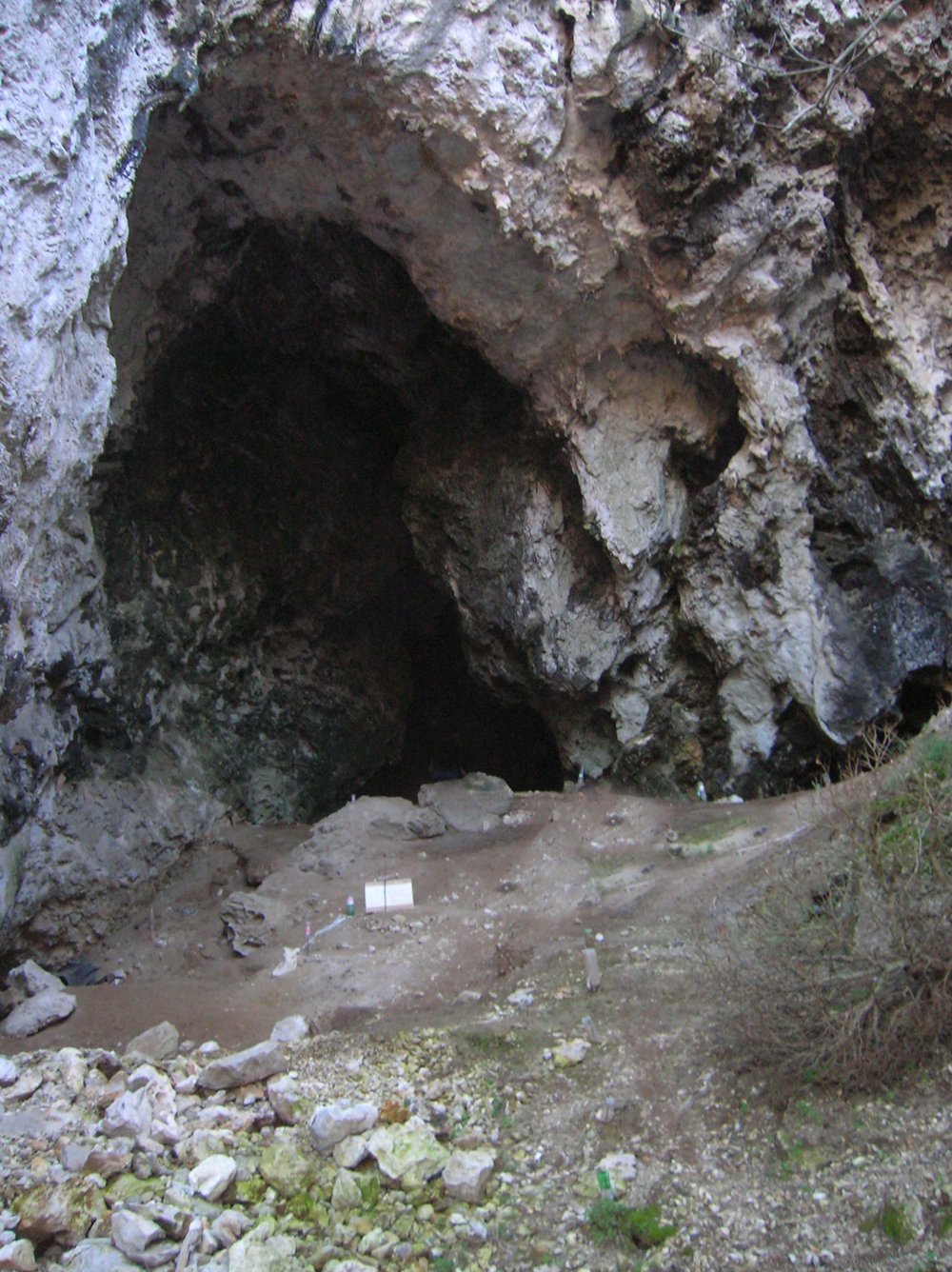
The Scoglietto Cave

The entire municipal area has been inhabited since prehistoric times, as evidenced by the remains in several caves located between the Uccellina Mountains and the mouth of the Ombrone River, inside the Maremma Regional Park. In particular, artifacts dating back to the Paleolithic, the Copper Age and Bronze Age have been discovered in the Fabbrica Cave and the Scoglietto Cave.

=== Rusellae ===
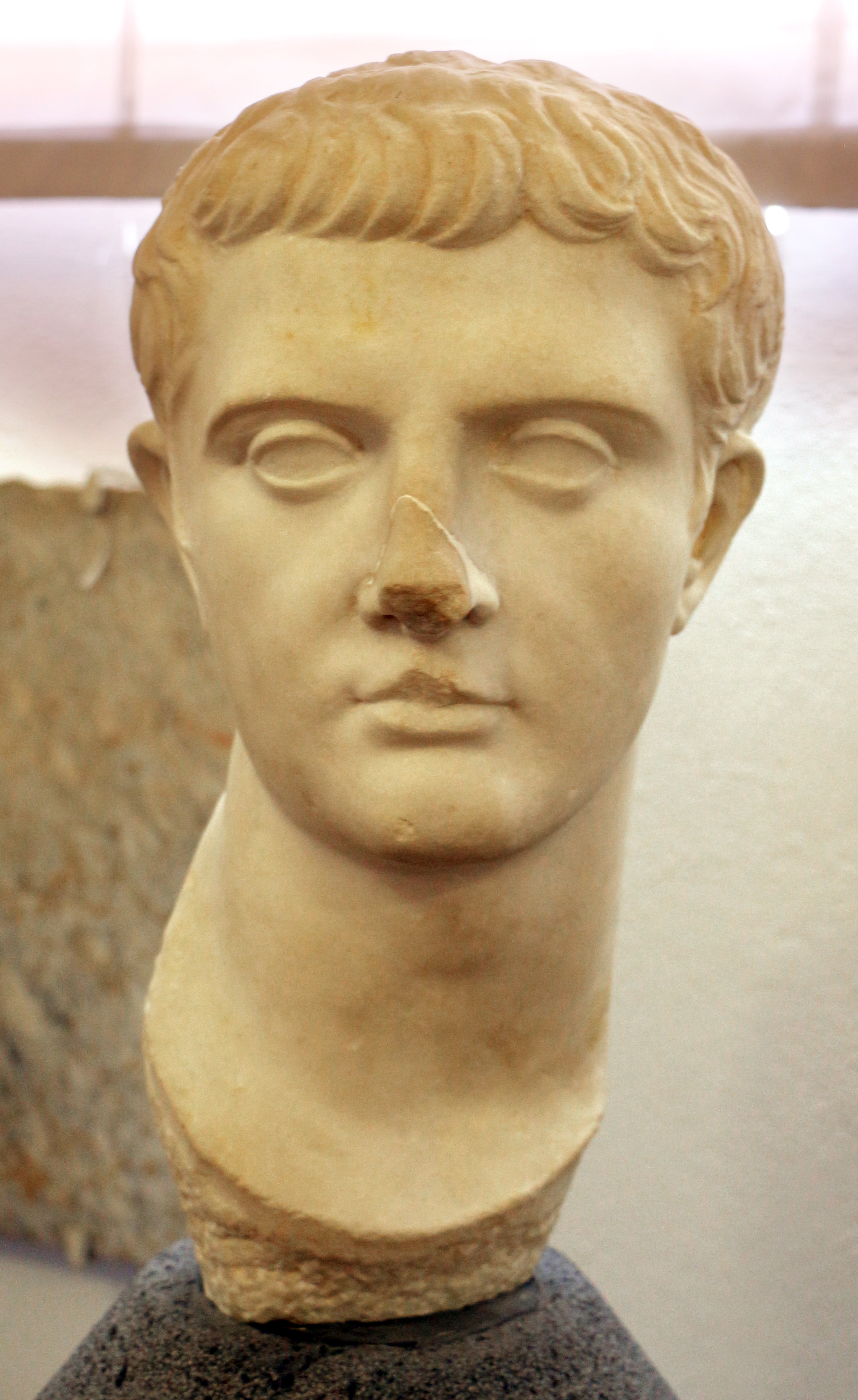
Portrait of Nero Claudius Drusus, Maremma Archaeological and Art Museum

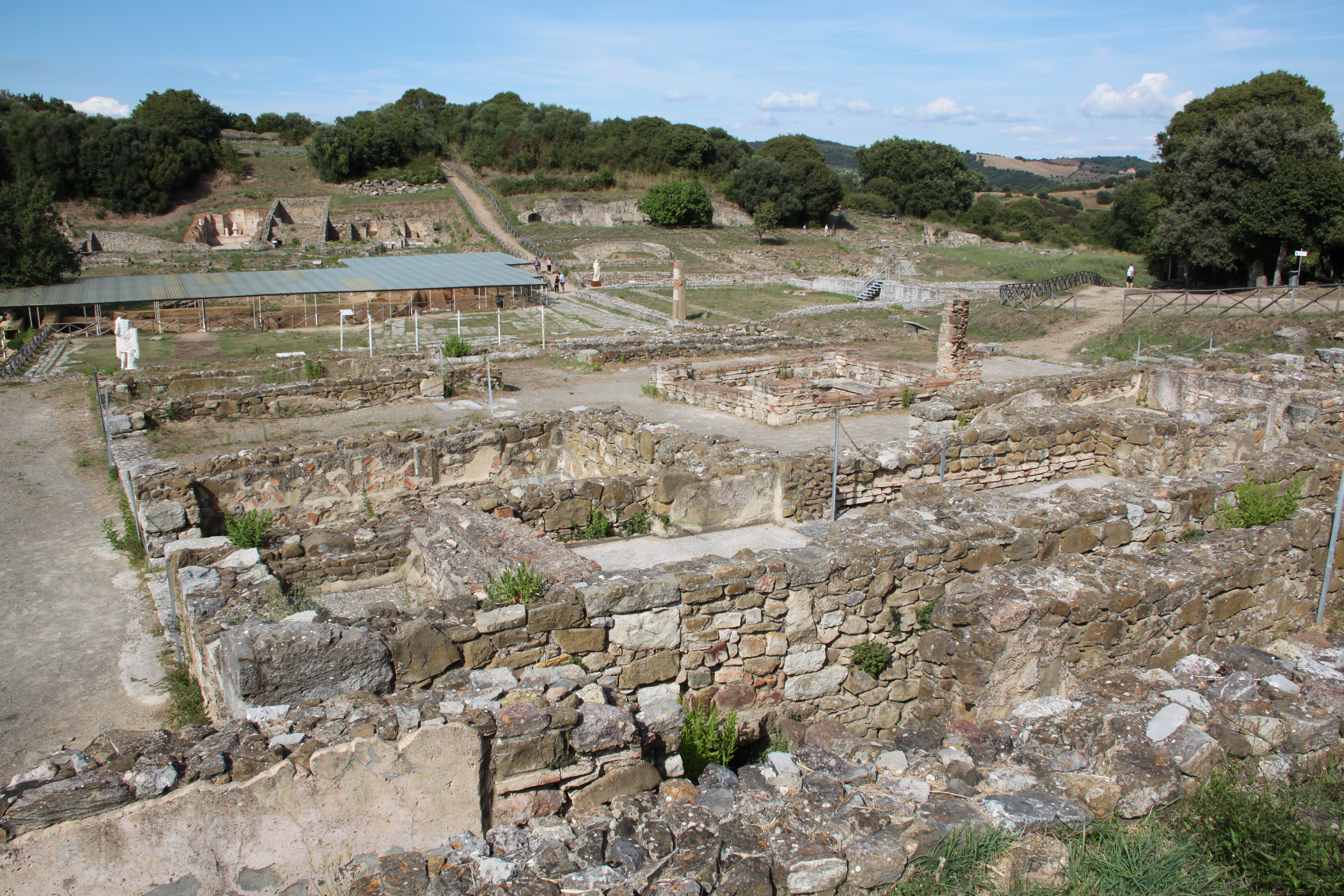
The archaeological site of Rusellae

Certainly the city of Grosseto, where is today located, did not exist in the Etruscan period, when instead the entire area was part of Rusellae, an important city nowadays situated few kilometers north of the downtown of Grosseto. In the 6th century BC, the period of greatest splendor of Rusellae, are documented commercial relations with other important Etruscan cities, such as Vetulonia, Populonia, Vulci and Chiusi as a member of the Etruscan dodecapolis. A flourishing city that governed a vast territory that went from the sea to Mount Amiata, it fought in the war against Tarquinius Priscus together with the other Latin peoples, then ended up conquered by the Romans in 294 BC and becoming a Roman municipium. In 205 BC it contributed to the supply of grain and wood for the fleet of Scipio Africanus during the Second Punic War. Under the empire it became a colonia and enjoyed a period of great splendor with the construction of forum, basilica, amphitheatre, and thermal baths. In the 5th century it was erected as a Christian bishop's seat (first attested in 499).

=== Middle Ages ===
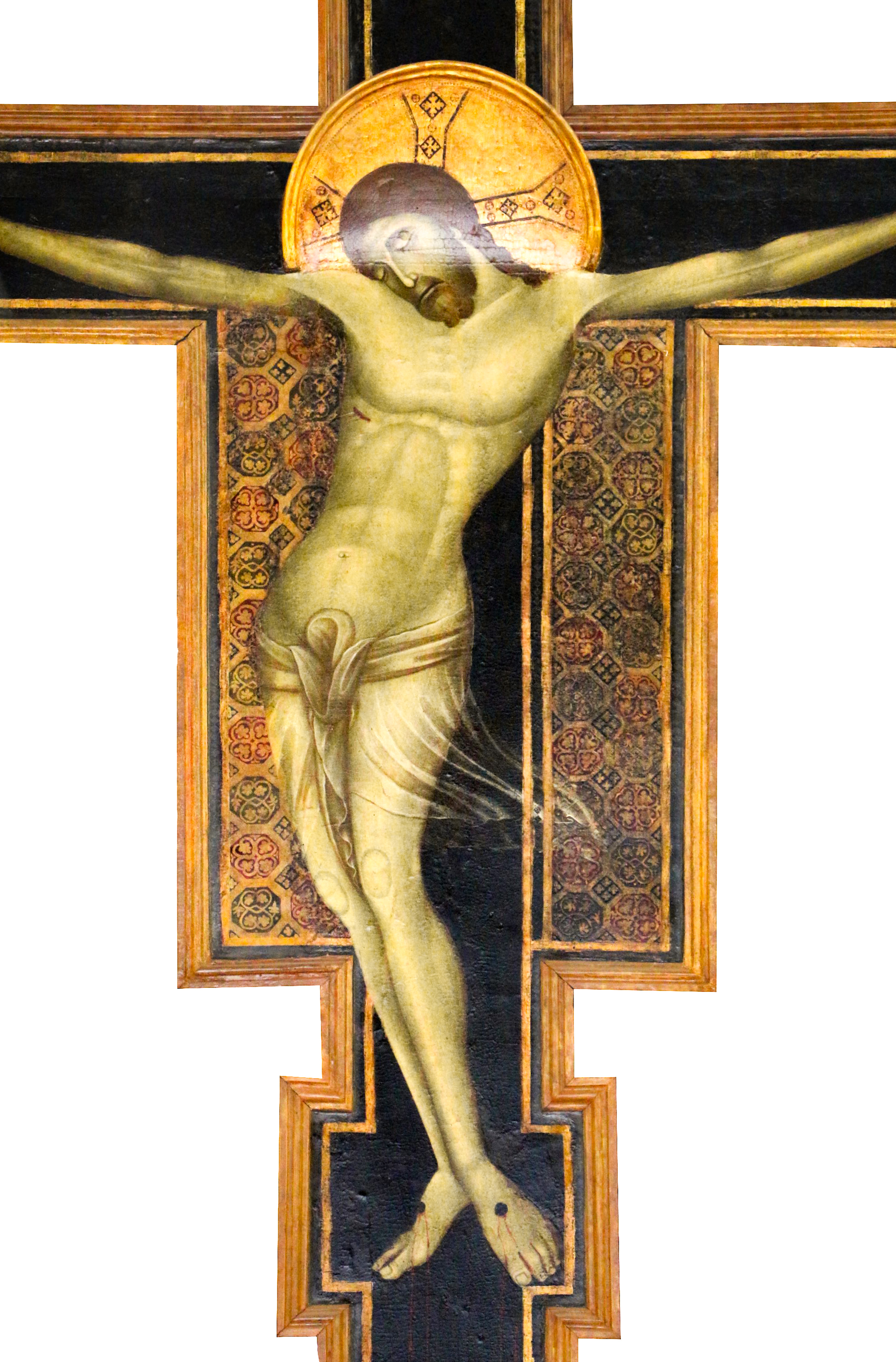
Crucifixion of Jesus Christ, uncertain author (Duccio?), 1280–1290, San Francesco Church

The decline of Rusellae began in the 6th century, paralleled by the barbarian invasions and the silting up of Lake Prile. By the end of the 6th century, Rusellae was one of the remaining Byzantine strongholds in Tuscia; the Lombard conquest dates back to the early 7th century. It was during this period that the first nucleus of the settlement of Grosseto formed, which some studies identify in the area now between Piazza della Palma and Piazza dei Martiri d'Istia. While continuing to be a bishopric, Rusellae suffered a decline in population in favor of Grosseto, that was rapidly growing along the Ombrone River. It was first mentioned in 803 as a fief of the Counts Aldobrandeschi, in a document recording the assignment of St. George's Church to Ildebrando degli Aldobrandeschi, whose successors were counts of the Grossetana Mark until the end of the 12th century.

Grosseto steadily grew in importance, owing to the decline of Rusellae and Vetulonia until it was one of the principal Tuscan cities. In 1137 the city was besieged by German troops, led by Duke Heinrich X of Bavaria, sent by the emperor Lothair III to reinstate his authority over the Aldobrandeschi. In the following year the bishopric of Roselle was transferred to Grosseto.

In 1151, the citizens swore loyalty to the Republic of Siena, and in 1222 the Aldobrandeschi gave the Grossetani the right to have their own podestà, together with three councilors and consuls. In 1244 the city was reconquered by the Sienese, and its powers, together with all the Aldobrandeschi's imperial privileges, were transferred to Siena by order of the imperial vicar. Thereafter Grosseto shared the fortunes of Siena. It became an important stronghold, and the fortress (rocca), the walls and bastions can still to be seen.

In 1266 and in 1355, Grosseto tried in vain to win freedom from the overlordship of Siena. While Guelph and Ghibelline parties struggled for control of that city, Umberto and Aldobrandino Aldobrandeschi tried to regain Grosseto for their family. The Sienese armies were, however, victorious, and in 1259 they named a podestà from their city. But Grosseto gained its freedom and in the following year and fought alongside the Florentine forces in the Battle of Montaperti.

Over the next 80 years Grosseto was again occupied, ravaged, excommunicated by Pope Clement IV, besieged by emperor Louis IV and by the antipope Nicholas V in 1328, until it finally submitted to its more powerful neighbour, Siena. The pestilence of 1348 struck Grosseto hard and by 1369 its population had been reduced to some hundred families. Its territory, moreover, was frequently ravaged, notably in 1447 by Alfons V of Sicily and in 1455 by Jacopo Piccinino.

=== Renaissance and modern era ===
Sienese rule ended in 1559, when Charles V handed over the whole duchy to Cosimo I de Medici, first grand duke of Tuscany. In 1574 the construction of a line of defensive walls was begun, which are still well preserved today, while the surrounding swampy plain was drained. Grosseto, however, remained a minor town, with only 700 inhabitants at the beginning of the 18th century. Under the rule of the House of Lorraine, Grosseto flourished. It was given the title of capital of the new Maremma province. In 1943, the city was heavily bombed by the Allies. On 22 March 1944, the Maiano Lavacchio massacre took place into the countryside between Grosseto and Magliano in Toscana.

== Geography ==
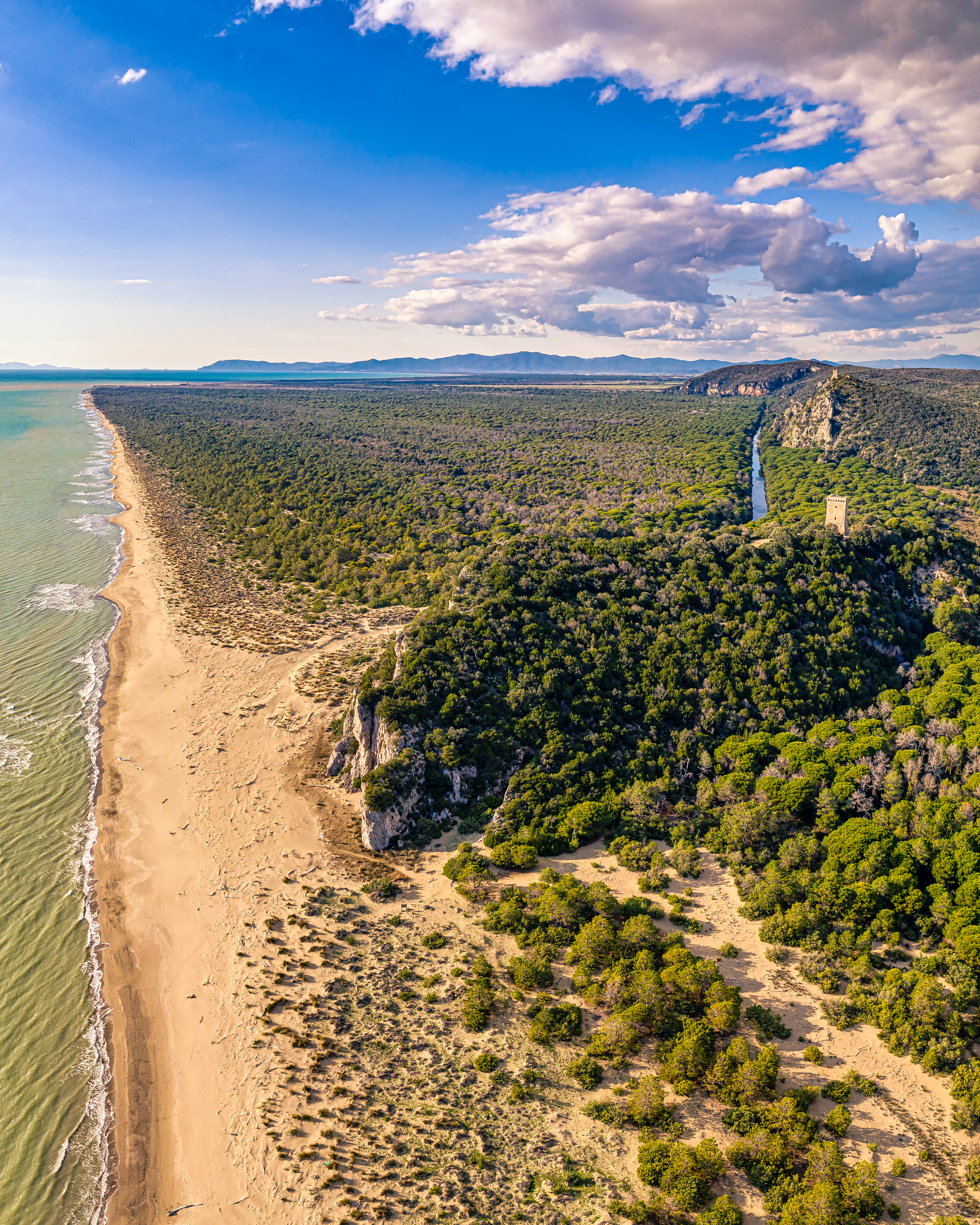
The Maremma Regional Park, located south of the city

Grosseto lies in a strategic position in Central Italy, on the coastal strip of Maremma, the historical region situated between Tuscany and Lazio. The city is located between the Metalliferous Hills to the north, the Mount Argentario and the Uccellina Mountains to the south and the Mount Amiata to the east, at the center of an alluvial plain known as the Piana Grossetana, where the Ombrone Valley meets the Tyrrhenian Sea. In the past, most of the plain was occupied by Lake Prile. The ancient coastal lake has almost completely disappeared following land reclamation works completed between the 18th and 20th centuries.

In the Roselle district lies the Poggio di Moscona, the symbolic 317-meter-high hill which stands in a dominant position over the city. At the foot of Poggio di Moscona flow various thermal springs, originated by the same aquifer of the famous Terme di Saturnia. The Ombrone River flows south of the city, first reaching Istia d'Ombrone and then passing some of the city's neighborhoods like San Martino, Albrino and Crespi, before continuing toward its mouth, called Bocca d'Ombrone.

The city's territory includes three important natural reserves: the Diaccia Botrona Natural Reserve, unreclaimed area of the ancient Lake Prile, the Maremma Regional Park, that includes Uccellina Mountains and Bocca d'Ombrone, and the Formiche di Grosseto islands, part of the Tuscan Archipelago National Park and of the Ligurian Sea Cetacean Sanctuary.

=== Climate ===
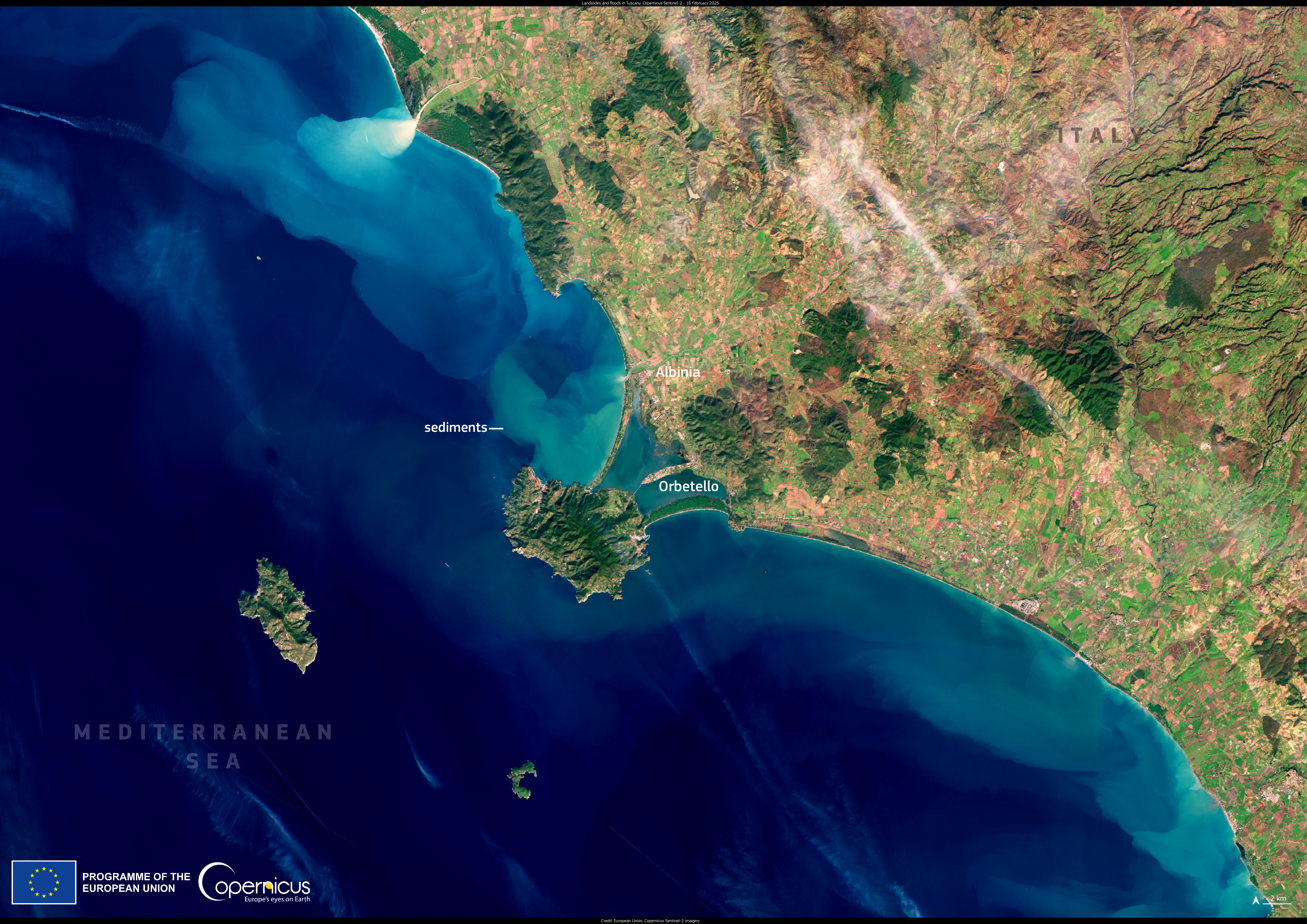
Sediments released into the sea by Albegna and Ombrone rivers following the floods of February 2025

Grosseto has a Mediterranean climate with mild wet winters and very hot humid summers. On average there are 25 nights a year where the low reaches or dips below 0 °C (32 °F) and 41 days where the high surpasses 30 °C (86 °F), sometimes reaching close to 40 °C (104 °F). Average annual temperatures hover around 15 °C (59 °F), with averages around 8 °C (46 °F) in January and close to 24 °C (75 °F) in July. Of all the Italian cities, Grosseto is one with the highest average number of sunny days per year. Extended periods of sunny days are frequent, especially during the spring and summer seasons, but sometimes also in winter. Precipitation is concentrated mainly in autumn, sometimes in the form of thunderstorms. Precipitation averages around 600 mm annually, distributed over 60 to 70 days. The city suffered severe damage during the Grosseto flood of November 4, 1966, and remained marginally affected by the Maremma Grossetana flood of November 2012.

Climate data for Grosseto (Grosseto Airport) (1991–2020)
Month	Jan	Feb	Mar	Apr	May	Jun	Jul	Aug	Sep	Oct	Nov	Dec	Year
Record high °C (°F)	19.6 (67.3)	22.8 (73.0)	25.2 (77.4)	29.4 (84.9)	33.6 (92.5)	39.0 (102.2)	38.8 (101.8)	40.2 (104.4)	35.0 (95.0)	30.6 (87.1)	27.0 (80.6)	20.0 (68.0)	40.2 (104.4)
Mean daily maximum °C (°F)	12.8 (55.0)	13.7 (56.7)	16.4 (61.5)	19.4 (66.9)	23.8 (74.8)	28.4 (83.1)	31.4 (88.5)	31.8 (89.2)	27.2 (81.0)	22.5 (72.5)	17.1 (62.8)	13.4 (56.1)	21.5 (70.7)
Daily mean °C (°F)	7.5 (45.5)	7.9 (46.2)	10.5 (50.9)	13.3 (55.9)	17.6 (63.7)	22.0 (71.6)	24.9 (76.8)	25.1 (77.2)	20.9 (69.6)	16.8 (62.2)	12.1 (53.8)	8.3 (46.9)	15.6 (60.1)
Mean daily minimum °C (°F)	2.9 (37.2)	2.6 (36.7)	4.8 (40.6)	7.3 (45.1)	11.2 (52.2)	15.0 (59.0)	17.8 (64.0)	18.4 (65.1)	15.2 (59.4)	11.8 (53.2)	7.7 (45.9)	3.9 (39.0)	9.9 (49.8)
Record low °C (°F)	−8.2 (17.2)	−13.0 (8.6)	−5.6 (21.9)	−2.6 (27.3)	1.6 (34.9)	6.8 (44.2)	8.8 (47.8)	10.6 (51.1)	5.8 (42.4)	1.4 (34.5)	−4.6 (23.7)	−10.1 (13.8)	−13.0 (8.6)
Average precipitation mm (inches)	41.4 (1.63)	36.9 (1.45)	39.4 (1.55)	38.8 (1.53)	39.7 (1.56)	23.1 (0.91)	15.0 (0.59)	30.0 (1.18)	62.7 (2.47)	58.4 (2.30)	99.4 (3.91)	69.2 (2.72)	553.9 (21.81)
Average precipitation days (≥ 1.0 mm)	5.3	5.0	5.9	5.7	5.2	2.9	1.6	2.0	4.8	6.3	9.1	7.9	61.7
Average relative humidity (%)	73.2	69.6	69.0	69.8	68.1	65.3	63.5	64.2	67.4	73.1	75.8	74.2	69.4
Average dew point °C (°F)	3.3 (37.9)	2.9 (37.2)	5.2 (41.4)	8.2 (46.8)	11.7 (53.1)	14.8 (58.6)	16.7 (62.1)	17.6 (63.7)	14.8 (58.6)	12.4 (54.3)	8.5 (47.3)	4.4 (39.9)	10.0 (50.0)
Source: NOAA

== Government ==
=== Subdivisions ===
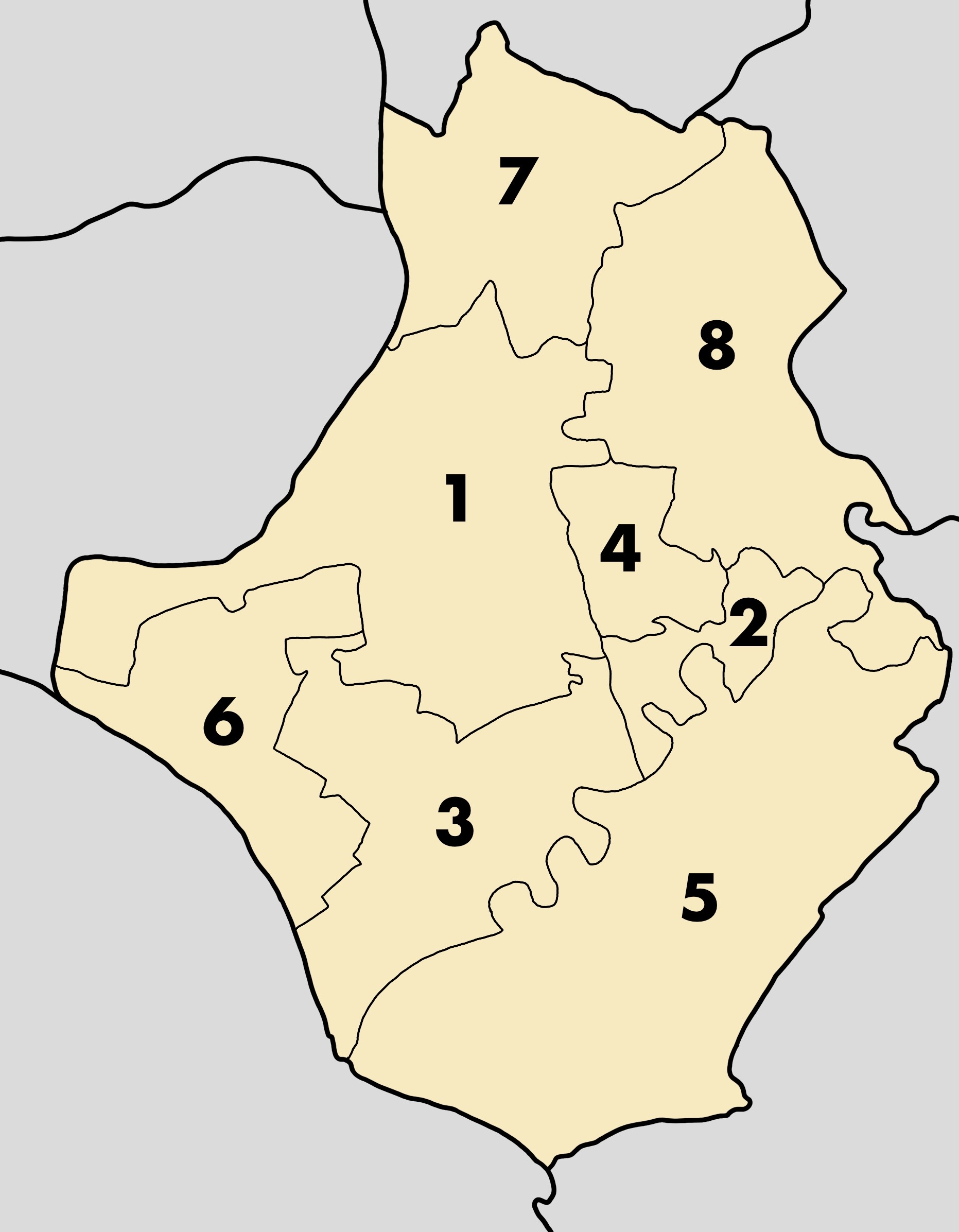
Map of the districts of Grosseto

The municipality of Grosseto was subdivided into eight districts (circoscrizioni) from 1977 to 2011.

District	Neighbourhoods (quartieri and frazioni)
Circoscrizione 1 Barbanella	Barbanella, Barbaruta, Casotto dei Pescatori, Cernaia, Marrucheto, Pollino, Posto Raccolta Quadrupedi, Rugginosa
Circoscrizione 2 Centro	Centro storico, Porta Nuova, Porta Vecchia, Borgo Corsica, Borgo Tripoli, Alberino, Crespi, San Martino, Casalecci
Circoscrizione 3 Gorarella	Gorarella, Pianetto, Principina Terra, Querciolo, San Lorenzo, Trappola
Circoscrizione 4 Pace	Sugherella, Commendone, Pace, Poggione, Villaggio Curiel, Villaggio Europa
Circoscrizione 5 Alberese-Rispescia	Alberese, Rispescia, Grancia, Ottava Zona
Circoscrizione 6 Marina	Marina di Grosseto, Principina a Mare
Circoscrizione 7 Braccagni-Montepescali	Braccagni, Montepescali, Acquisti, Madonnino, Versegge
Circoscrizione 8 Istia-Batignano-Roselle	Batignano, Istia d'Ombrone, Roselle, Nomadelfia, Vallerotana

=== Frazioni ===
==== Alberese ====
Alberese, small town located less of 20 kilometres (12 mi) south-east of the urban area, included in the Maremma Regional Park. The name is also extended to the surrounding rural areas which go from the first foothills of the hinterland hills to the sea through the northern slopes of the Uccellina Mountains.

==== Batignano ====
Batignano developed in the Medieval period, around the castle which controlled the outlet of the road towards Siena on the plain of Grosseto and some lead and silver mines. It was a feud of the Aldobrandeschi and in 1213 belonged to Manto da Grosseto. In 1738 it was reunited with the comune of Grosseto.

==== Braccagni ====
Braccagni is a residential area, born as the railway station of Montepescali, situated north of the city. It hosts the Grosseto Exhibition Center.

==== Istia d'Ombrone ====
Istia d'Ombrone is a town situated about 3 kilometres (2 mi) east of the urban limit of the city. Istia emerged as a fortified settlement along the Ombrone Valley and it was owned by the bishops of Roselle since 862. Now is also considered as a residential area.

==== Marina di Grosseto ====
Marina di Grosseto is a famous tourist destination located 12 kilometres (7 mi) from the city center; it is an important seaside resort. Once a fishing village, it is known for its hilly hinterland, rich in macchia and wide beaches overlooking the Tyrrhenian Sea, with a vast pine forest that extends from Punta Ala to Alberese.

==== Montepescali ====
Montepescali is a small town of medieval origins. The site, from which the scenic panorama of the coastal strip and the Tuscan Archipelago up to Corsica can be seen, is also known as "Balcony of the Maremma".

==== Principina a Mare ====
Principina a Mare is a seaside resort located south of Marina di Grosseto. The settlement, sparsely populated land in winter, consists primarily of houses of holidaymakers, hotels, high class and a camp category average. However, the location is quite popular due to its proximity to the mouth of the Ombrone River and the Maremma Regional Park.

==== Principina Terra ====
Principina Terra is located west of the urban area, almost halfway between the city center and the seaside resorts of Marina di Grosseto and Principina a Mare.

==== Rispescia ====
Rispescia is a modern residential area, located south-east of the capital, near the frazione of Alberese.

==== Roselle ====
Roselle (in Latin Rusellae) was once a mayor city of Etruria. The ancient city was built by Etruscans on a hill that offered protection and commanded all the nearby valley. The extent of its dominion is not clear, but probably at its peak included most of the Vetulonia territory. The city's splendour ended in 294 BCE, when, according to Livy, the Roman Republic conquered it. After the end of the Roman Empire, in the 5th century, Roselle was still the most important centre of what is now southern Tuscany. Its gradual decline began in 1138, when the diocesan seat and the population were moved to the new settlement of Grosseto. Etruscan ruins had been discovered in Roselle, including cyclopean walls, 6 kilometres (4 mi) in circumference, and sulphur baths, which in the last century were restored for medicinal uses. On the top of the hill is located an ancient amphitheatre.

The modern settlement, also known as Bagno Roselle, situated at the foot of Poggio di Moscona, is a residential area, conurbated with the city.

== Demographics ==
Historical population

Year	Pop.	±%
1861	4,724	—
1871	5,747	+21.7%
1881	6,783	+18.0%
1901	9,694	+42.9%
1911	11,875	+22.5%
1921	17,059	+43.7%
1931	23,088	+35.3%
1936	26,383	+14.3%

Year	Pop.	±%
1951	38,190	+44.8%
1961	51,730	+35.5%
1971	62,590	+21.0%
1981	69,523	+11.1%
1991	71,257	+2.5%
2001	71,263	+0.0%
2011	78,630	+10.3%
2021	81,503	+3.7%

Source: ISTAT

Grosseto's historical demographic instability is due to numerous historical and social factors, including malaria, which was widespread in the swamps of the Grosseto Plain. Before the Black Death of 1348, the city had an estimated population of 7 000 to 8 000 people. The worst period, when the population estimated was of 600 people, was reached during the House of Medici rule, following the fortification of the city. Grosseto's current demographic growth began only in the 19th century, following the intense land reclamation works concluded during the Fascist regime. At the time of Italian unification, the city, with approximately 4 700 inhabitants, was still suffering from the negative effects of malaria. By the early 20th century, the population had already doubled. The growth continued and continues exponentially thanks to the arrival of numerous immigrants, first from northeastern Italy (mostly from Veneto), and in the following decades from other regions, especially southern Italy.

=== Foreign population ===
Largest resident foreign-born groups as 31 December 2023
Country of birth	Population
Romania	1,721
Albania	1,036
Ukraine	606
Morocco	478
Moldova	393
Bangladesh	343
Pakistan	297
Poland	209
China	192
Dominican Republic	167

=== Religion ===
Near the urban area is located Nomadelfia, a catholic community founded by the priest Zeno Saltini in 1948.

The Italian Apostolic Church was founded in Grosseto in 1927; the city is home of the national centre.

== Economy ==
The city's economy is based on services, agriculture and seaside tourism. In 2023 the city recorded more than one million tourists presences, while the nearby town of Castiglione della Pescaia more than 1,5. Grosseto is the Italian municipality with the highest number of agritourism, with about 239 destinations. Italian tourists come from cities such as Arezzo, Siena and Florence and from northern Italy, while international tourism is mainly made up of Germans, Austrians, Swiss and Dutch. Besides the coast, the city is also frequented by tourists for the services offered, such as shopping centers and health facilities.

== Culture ==
=== Literature ===
Andrea da Grosseto was born in Grosseto in the first half of the 1200s. He is very important in Italian literature, because he is considered the first writer in the Italian language. Andrea da Grosseto translated from Latin the Moral Treaties of Albertano of Brescia, in 1268. His texts were written in the Italian language, without too many redundancies and constructions, words and typical ways of speech of the vernacular and the dialect. The writer intended to not utilise his own Grossetan dialect, but to use a general "Italian national language". In fact he twice refers to the vernacular which he uses defining it italico (Italic). So Andrea da Grosseto was the first to intend to use vernacular as a national unifying language from the north to the south of the entire Peninsula.

An other important writer was Luciano Bianciardi, one of the most important writers of the Italian literature in the second half of the 20th century.

=== Museums ===
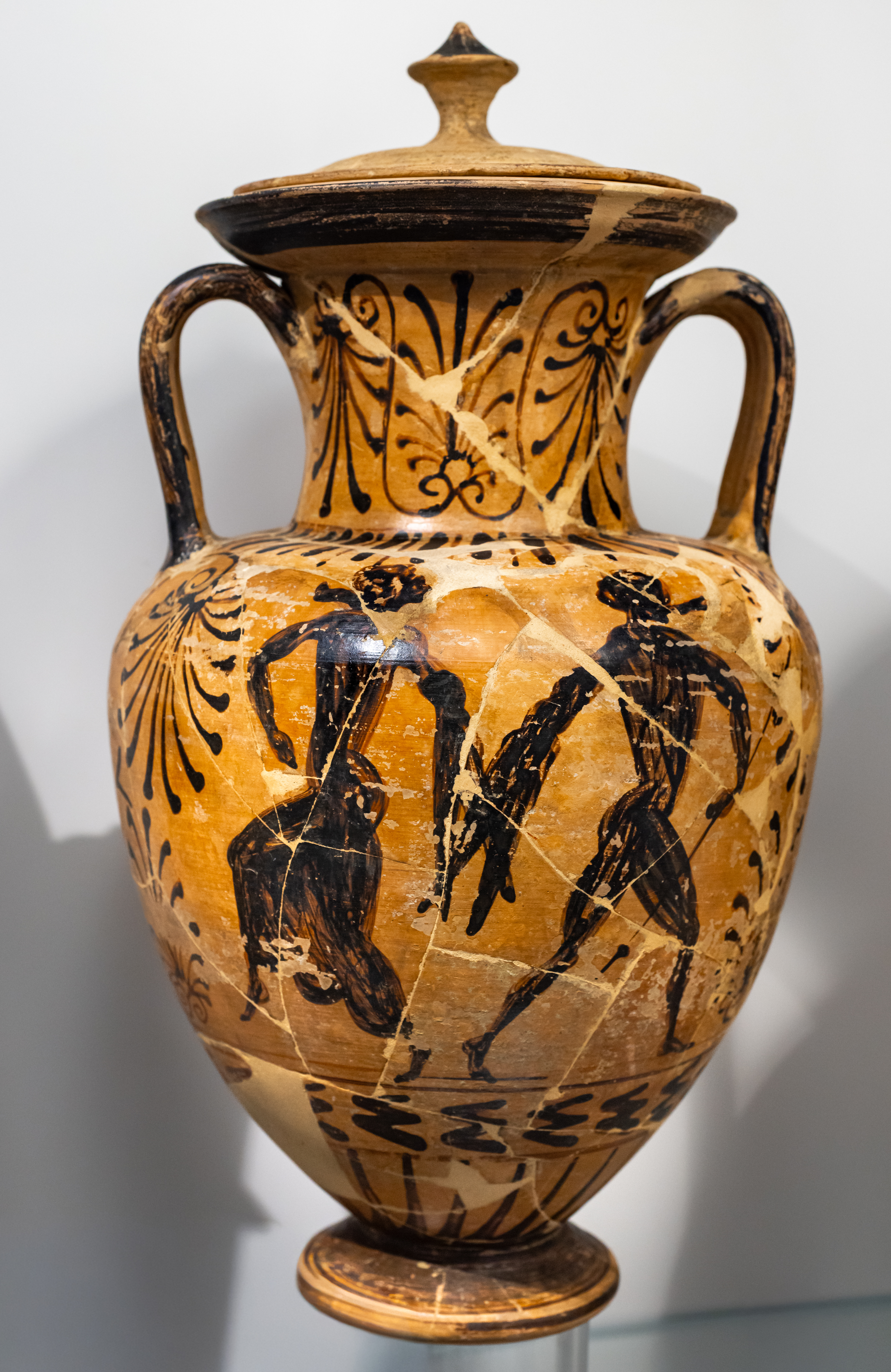
Etruscan vase found in Vulci, 500-480 BC, Maremma Archaeological and Art Museum

- Maremma Archaeological and Art Museum
- Natural History of Maremma Museum
- Gianfranco Luzzetti Collection Museum
- Diocese of Grosseto Sacred Art Museum
- Museolab Città di Grosseto
- Savoia Cavalleria 3rd Regiment Museum
- Ildebrando Imberciadori Local History Museum of Montepescali
- Green Art Maremma, an open-air museum of contemporary art
- Municipal Aquarium
- Museum of the Buttero and Popular Traditions
- Museum of the 4th Fighter Wing of the Italian Air Force
- Historical Museum of the Military Veterinary Center (CeMiVet).

=== Cinema ===
Grosseto and Maremma have been settings for numerous works of fiction and movies, including the novels and associated films, such as The Easy Life (1962) with Vittorio Gassman; La vita agra (1964), from the novel of the same name by Luciano Bianciardi, with Ugo Tognazzi; An Ideal Place To Kill (1969) directed by Umberto Lenzi; In viaggio con papà (1982), with Alberto Sordi; Nothing Left to Do But Cry (1984), with Massimo Troisi and Roberto Benigni; It's Happening Tomorrow (1988); Viola bacia tutti (1997) with Asia Argento; The Talented Mr. Ripley with Matt Damon and Jude Law; Emma sono io (2002); Roberto Benigni's Pinocchio; Manuale d'amore 3 (2011) with Robert De Niro and Monica Bellucci; Swiss movie Summer Games; Margins (2022), and some Leonardo Pieraccioni's movies. Famous Italian actress Elsa Martinelli and actor Luigi Pistilli were both born in Grosseto. Actress Laura Morante was born in Santa Fiora, and director Umberto Lenzi in Massa Marittima, both in the province of Grosseto.

=== Cuisine ===
Is popular the traditional Maremman Cousine. Schiaccia alla pala (oven-baked bread with oil) and Schiaccia con cipolle e acciughe (oven-baked bread with onions and anchovies) are typical breads of the city of Grosseto.

== Main sights ==
=== The Medicean Walls ===
The walls were commissioned by Cosimo I de Medici in 1564, in order to replace those from the 12th-14th centuries, as part of his policy of making Grosseto a stronghold to protect his southern border. The design was by Baldassarre Lanci, and construction began in 1565. Until 1757 the exterior was surrounded by a ditch with an earthen moat. There were two main gates: Porta Nuova on the north and Porta Reale (now Porta Vecchia) on the south.

The walls are now used as a public park and walking area.

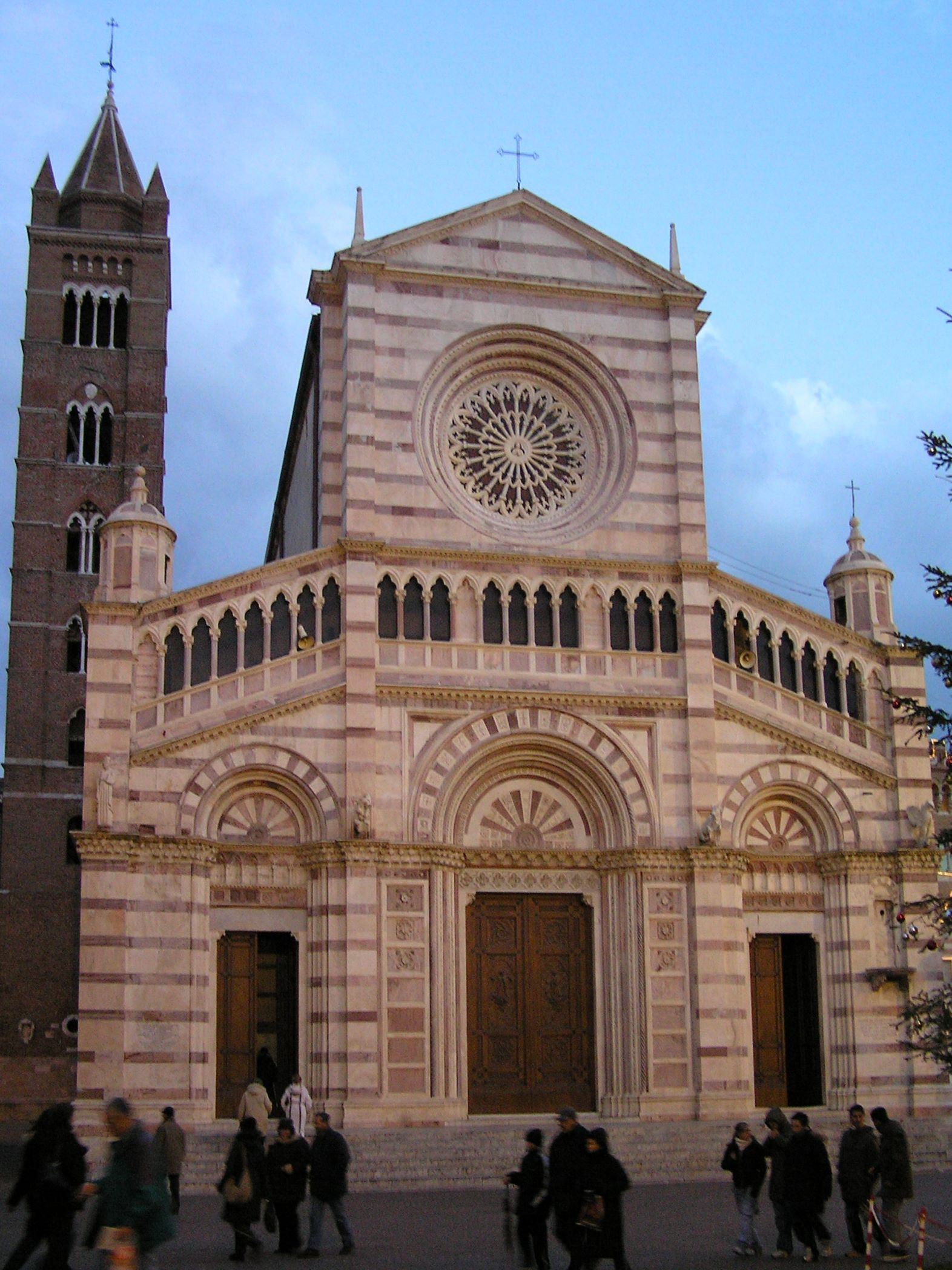
The Cathedral of Grosseto.

=== Religious architecture ===
==== Cathedral ====
The Romanesque cathedral, the main monument of the city, is named for its patron St. Lawrence, and was begun at the end of the 13th century, by architect Sozzo Rustichini of Siena. Erected over the earlier church of Santa Maria Assunta, it was only finished in the 15th century (mainly due to the continuing struggles against Siena).

The façade of alternate layers of white and black marble is Romanesque in style, but is almost entirely the result of 16th century and 1816–1855 restorations: it retains decorative parts of the originary buildings, including Evangelists' symbols. The layout consists of a Latin cross, with transept and apse. The interior has a nave with two aisles, separated by cruciform pilasters. The main artworks are a wondrously carved baptismal font from 1470 to 1474 and the Madonna delle Grazie by Matteo di Giovanni (1470).

The campanile (bell tower) was finished in 1402, and restored in 1911.

==== Churches in the city centre ====
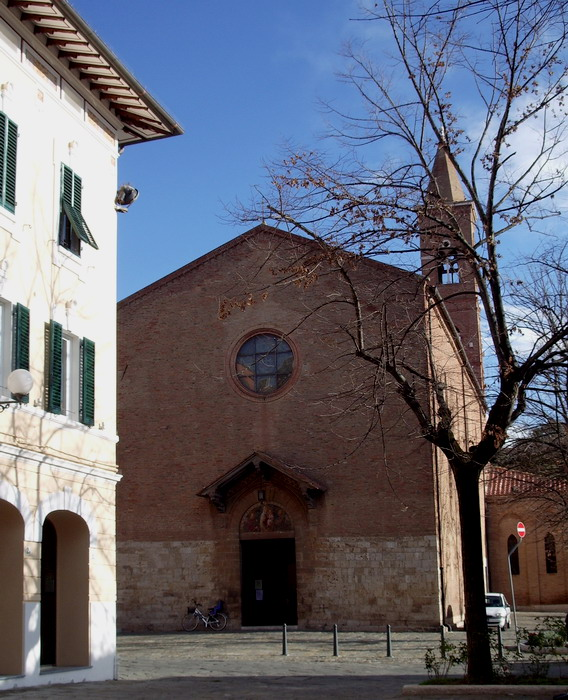
Church of San Francesco

- Church of San Francesco. Situated on the square with the same name, it was built in the 13th century, initially a Benedictine, later Franciscan convent. The complex underwent several restorations and reconstructions: the bell was rebuilt in the first half of the 20th century. Very characteristic is the wooden tabernacle that stands on the front and inside there are works of art from various historical periods. At the center of the cloister stands the characteristic Pozzo della Bufala (Well of the Buffalo) in travertine; another well is located in the square outside the church.
- Convent of Clarisse. Located on strada Vinzaglio, the convent is annexed to the Church of Bigi. The convent of Clarisse and the church of Bigi are now deconsecrated. The entire complex is characterized by the probable medieval origins, which was followed by a series of restorations in Baroque style in the 17th century. Today the convent hosts the Museolab Città di Grosseto and the university.
- Church of San Pietro. The oldest religious building in town, on Corso Carducci.
- Church of Misericordia (19th century). It belonged to various religious orders during the following centuries, before moving on brotherhood in the early decades of the 19th century. In the past, there were several well-preserved works of art currently on display in the section on Sacred Art of the Archaeological and Art Museum of Maremma.

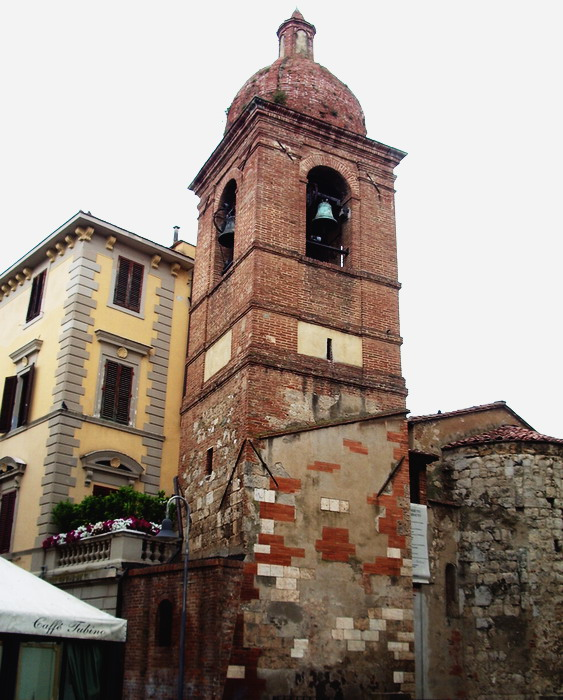
Bell Tower of the Church of San Pietro

==== Churches outside the city walls ====
- Basilica of Sacro Cuore di Gesù, a minor basilica built in 1958, it was designed by engineer Ernesto Ganelli and is located on Via della Pace.
- Church of Medaglia Miracolosa, built in the early 20th century behind the Palazzo delle Poste in a neo-Romanesque style. It has a bell tower.
- Church of San Giuseppe, located in the western part of the urban area, in the Barbanella neighborhood, it was built in the 1930s in Romanesque Revival style.
- Church of San Giuseppe Benedetto Cottolengo, built on the eastern end of the urban area around the middle of last century, the style is Romanesque Revival. It was designed by engineer Ganelli and consecrated in 1951.
- Maria Santissima Addolorata, built in the 1970s in the neighbourhood of Gorarella, it was designed by architect Carlo Boccianti.
- Santissimo Crocifisso, a modern parish church for the residents of the suburb of Porta Vecchia, it was designed by Carlo Boccianti.
- Santa Lucia, a modern church situated in the neighbourhood of Barbanella.
- Church of Santa Famiglia, designed by Enzo Pisaneschi and located in the neighbourhood of Sugherella.
- Santa Teresa, consecrated in 2018, it is situated in the northern part of the urban area.

==== Abbeys ====
- Abbey of San Rabano, at the southern end of the town of Grosseto in the heart of the Natural Park of Maremma. It was built in the Middle Ages as a Benedictine monastery, passed after the Order of the Knights of Jerusalem and it was finally abandoned in the 16th century.
- Abbey of San Pancrazio al Fango, situated between Grosseto and Castiglione della Pescaia, in the heart of Nature Reserve Diaccia Botrona, not far from La Badiola estate. The church, which is in the form of ruins, was built in the Middle Ages on a slight hill overlooking the surrounding wetlands, once occupied by Lake Prile near a building from Roman times.

=== Civil architecture ===
==== Palazzi and other buildings ====
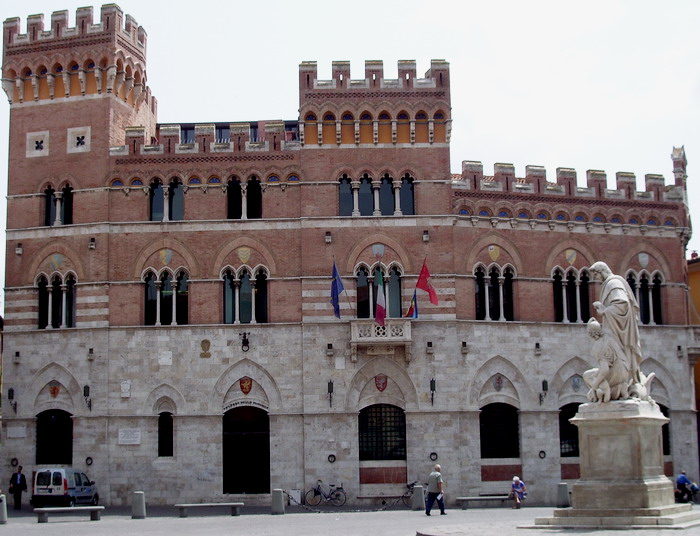
Palazzo Aldobrandeschi.

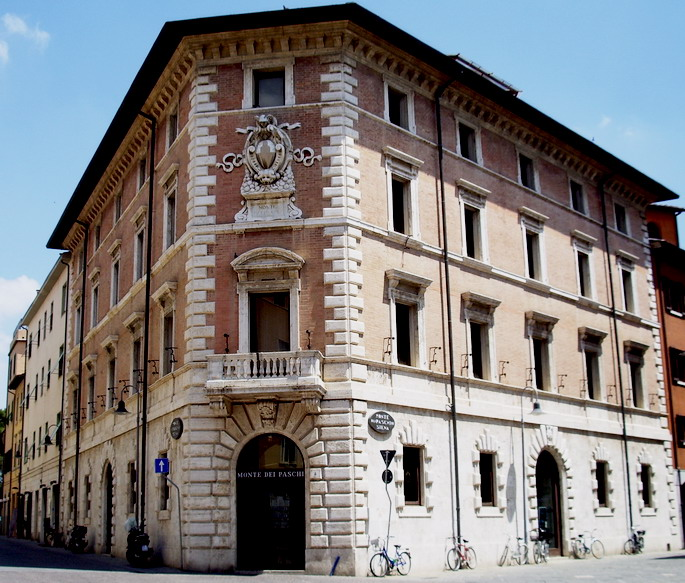
Palazzo del Monte dei Paschi.

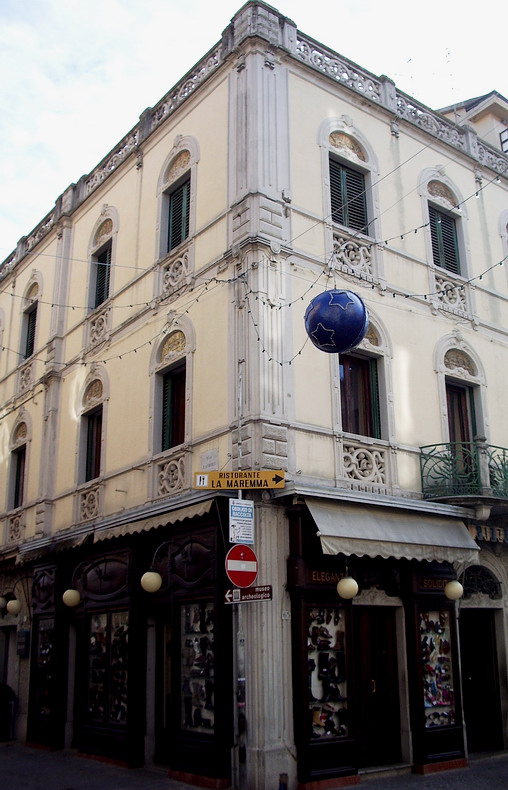
Palazzo Tognetti.

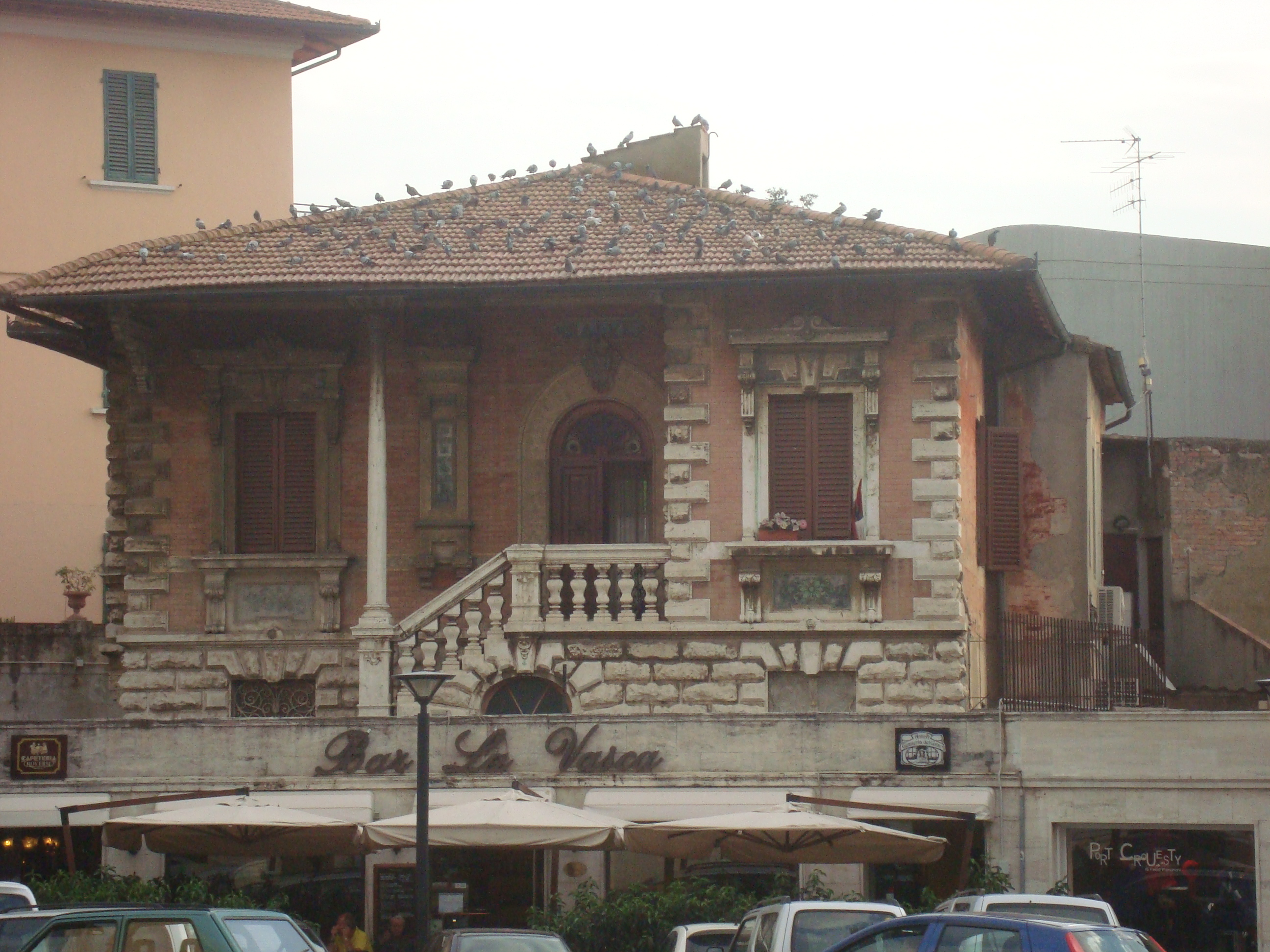
Villino Panichi.

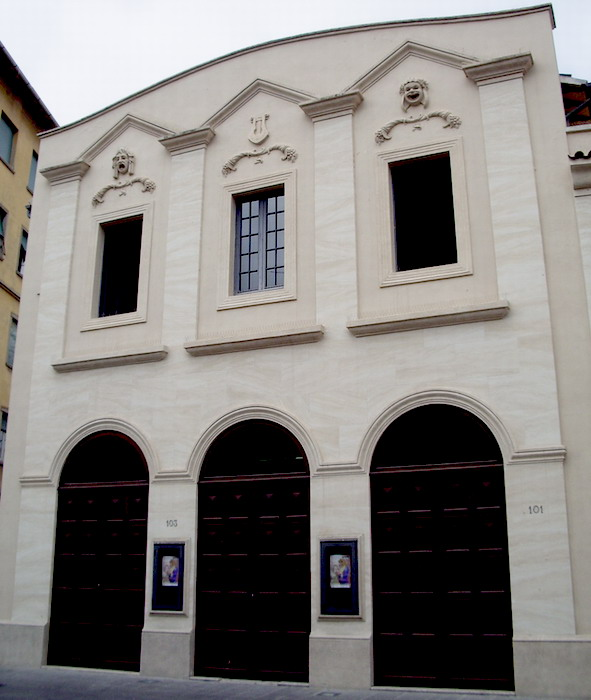
Teatro degli Industri.

Within the walls of Grosseto are the following buildings:

- Palazzo Aldobrandeschi, located on Piazza Dante, is a Gothic Revival building designed by architect Lorenzo Porciatti as the seat of the province of Grosseto.
- Palazzo Comunale (Town Hall), located on Piazza del Duomo, to the left of the cathedral, was built between 1870 and 1873.
- Episcopal Palace. It hosts the offices and the curia of the Roman Catholic Diocese of Grosseto.
- Palazzo Monte dei Paschi, it is a Renaissance Revival palace designed by Vittorio Mariani.
- Grand Hotel Bastiani, a Renaissance Revival style building designed by Mariani.
- Palazzo del Genio Civile, built in the early 20th century, it shows fine ceramic decorations.
- Palazzo Tognetti, an Art Nouveau style building on three levels located on Corso Carducci.
- Palazzo Moschini, it houses the State Archives of Grosseto.
- Palazzo Carmignani, a landmark building built in 1921.
- Palazzo Chiarini, located in Via dell'Unione, it dates back to the 17th century.
- Palazzo Berti. Overlooking on Corso Carducci in the front of the Church of San Pietro, it is a stately and elegant building built in 1894.
- Palazzo Cappelli, located on Corso Carducci to the right of San Pietro, it is in a neoclassical style building.
- Palazzo Pallini, a neoclassical building of the early 20th century, it is located along Corso Carducci.
- Palazzo Mensini, built in 1898, it is the seat of the Chelliana Library.
- Cassero del Sale, built during the 13th century to store the salt collected from the wetland of the coast.
- Casa del Fascio, it was built during Fascism to host the local National Fascist Party.
- Cinema Marraccini, former cinema opened in 1926 and closed in 2003.
- Grosseto Prison, a 19th-century jailhouse.
- Villino Magrassi, an eclectic-style villa built in 1927 by architect Francesco Pistelli.
- Villino Mazzoncini, an early 20th-century villa on Via Mazzini, in front of the Theatre of Industri.

Outside the walls of Grosseto are the following buildings:

- Villino Pastorelli, a Gothic Revival villa built between 1908 and 1913 by the architect Lorenzo Porciatti.
- Villino Panichi, an Art Nouveau villa built in 1900 by the architect Porciatti.
- Middle school "Giovanni Pascoli", a middle school located in Piazza della Vasca, it was originally built in 1923 by the engineer Giuseppe Luciani to accommodate boarding and a normal school.
- Palazzo delle Poste (Post Office), located on Piazza della Vasca, it was designed by the architect Angiolo Mazzoni in 1930, as a symbol of Fascist architecture.
- Palazzo del Governo, it was designed by Vittorio Mariani and built in 1927.
- Cosimini Building, it is a multipurpose facility (bank, offices, apartments and shops) designed by Ludovico Quaroni in 1970.
- Palazzina Tempesti, an Art Nouveau building on Viale Mameli.
- Villino Andreini, an Art Nouveau building on Viale Mameli.

==== Theatres ====
- Teatro degli Industri, located on Via Mazzini, it was built in the 19th century. It is one of the main sites of the culture of Grosseto.
- Teatro Moderno, a modern theatre located outside the city walls. It was used for the trial against Francesco Schettino in 2014–15.

=== Sculptures and memorials ===
- Canapone, a marble statue celebrating Leopold II, Grand Duke of Tuscany, located in the center of Piazza Dante.
- Colonna dei bandi, a Roman column from Rusellae located at the right side of the cathedral, it was traditionally used as the public spot to post municipal notices.
- Grosseto War Memorial, originally built in 1896, it is located along the walls, on the Rimembranza bastion. It honors the victims of the Italian War of Independence, World War I and World War II.
- Monument to Andrea da Grosseto, made between 1973 and 1974 by sculptor Arnaldo Mazzanti, it is located in Piazza Baccarini. It commemorates Andrea da Grosseto, the scholar who translated the Moral Treatises of Albertanus of Brescia in 1268 providing a first example of Italian literary prose.
- Monument to Ettore Socci, located in the Piazza Ettore Socci, it was made in 1907 by Emilio Gallori in honor of the politician Ettore Socci.

=== Wells ===
- Pozzo dello Spedale (lit. 'Well of the Hospital'), made during the 15th century, it is located in the Piazza San Francesco in front of the right lateral side of the church of San Francesco.
- Pozzo della Bufala (lit. 'Well of the Buffalo'), located in the courtyard of the cloister of San Francesco, was built by the Medici to replace an existing well to supply water to the men who lived in the convent.
- Pozzo della Fortezza (lit. 'Well of the Fortress'), located in the Piazza d'Armi inside the Fortezza bastion that surrounds the fortified Citadel, it was built in the 16th century for supply water of the guards stationed there.

=== Others ===
- The Etruscan-Roman site of Rusellae.
- Medieval buildings in the frazioni of Batignano, Istia d'Ombrone and Montepescali.
- Granducal villa of Alberese, built by the Knights Hospitaller in the 15th century, and later used as residence by the Grand Dukes of Tuscany.

== Sports ==
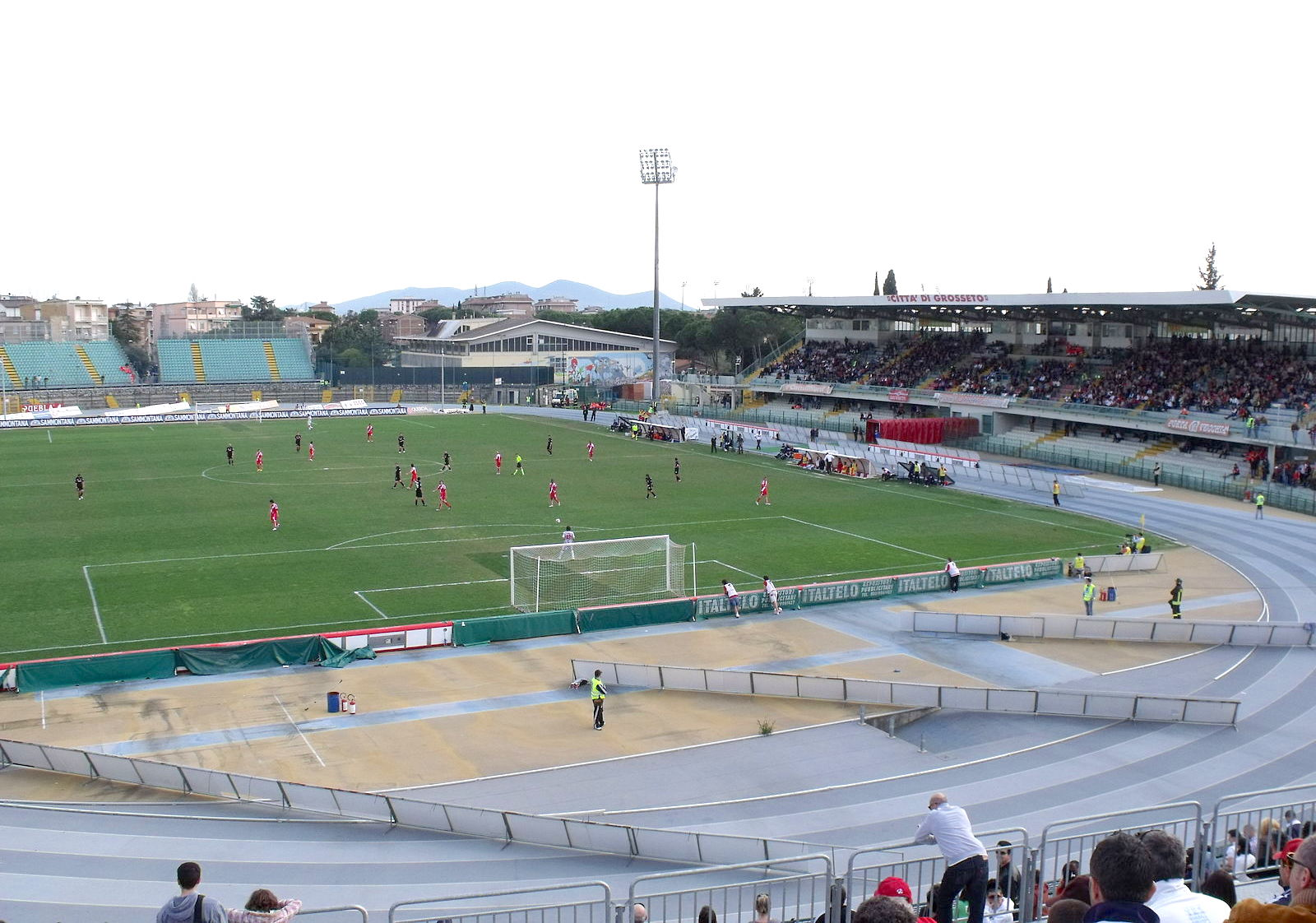
Stadio Olimpico Carlo Zecchini

Grosseto has a long tradition in sports. The city is home to two baseball clubs that play in Serie A: BSC Grosseto 1952 and BBC Grosseto. Home games are played at the Stadio Roberto Jannella. Football arrived in Grosseto in the early 20th century. In 1912 was founded the main city club U.S. Grosseto 1912. It plays in Serie C and hosts home games at the Stadio Olimpico Carlo Zecchini. The olympic stadium is also an international hub for athletics events.

== Education ==
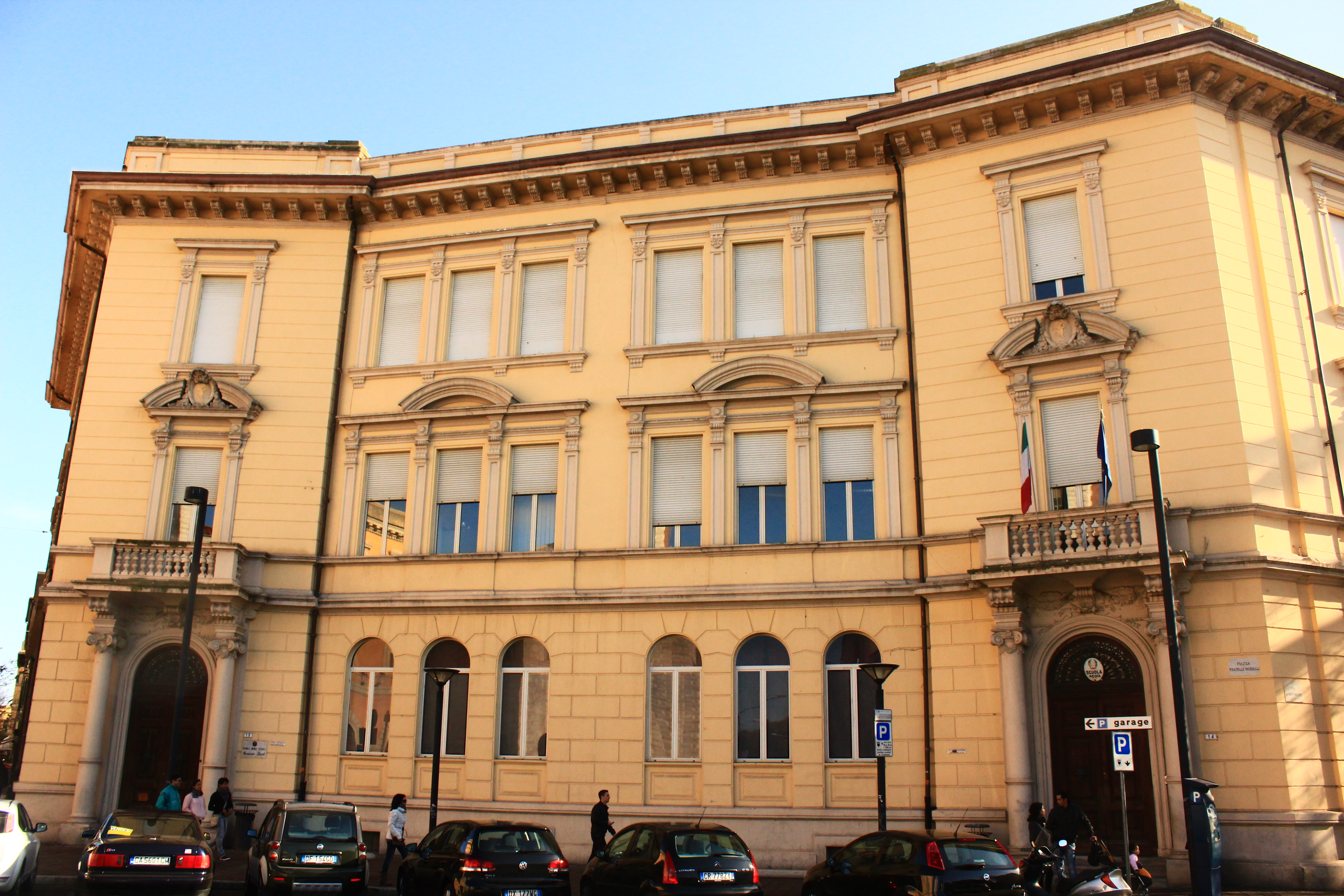
Giovanni Pascoli middle school

Some of the city's high schools are situated inside the Cittadella dello Studente, a campus which hosts thousands of students and offers them services such as sport facilities and student accommodations. The university center, called Polo Universitario Grossetano, was founded in 1998.

The Misericordia Hospital is home to the International School of Robotic Surgery, founded in 2004 by Pier Cristoforo Giulianotti. First training center of robotic surgery in Italy and one of the most important in the world, it was the first in Europe to broadcast fully recorded surgeries. It collaborates with international university centers, including the University of Illinois Chicago.

== Transport ==
=== Trains ===
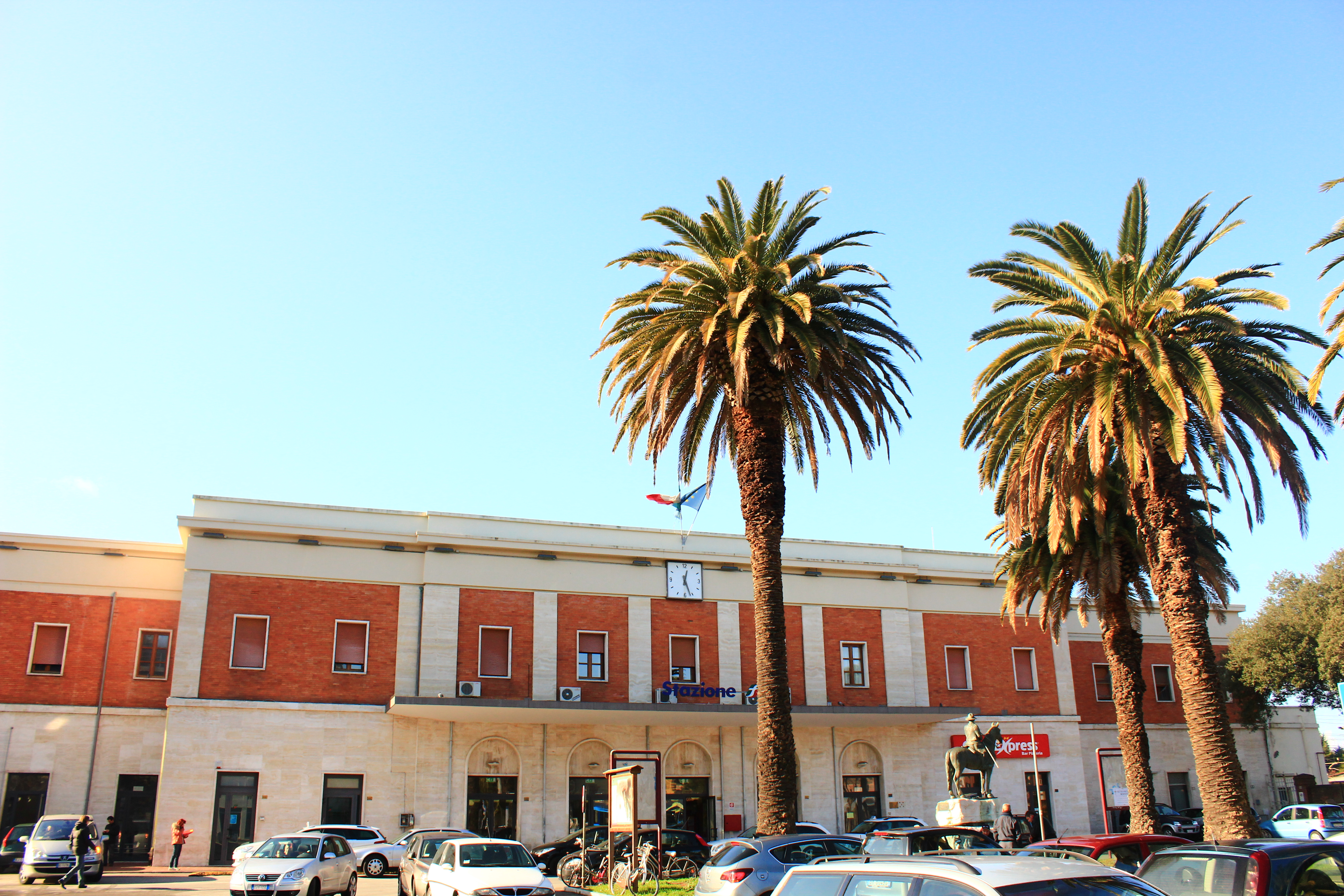
The Grosseto railway station

The city is served by the Pisa-Rome railway line (also called as Tyrrenian Railway) connecting Genoa to the Capital and serves as the terminus of trains on the single track branch line to Siena.

Here is the list of railway stations in the city of Grosseto:

- Grosseto station, situated along the Pisa-Roma line, it is also the terminus of the Siena-Grosseto railway. It is the main railway station of the city.
- Montepescali station, located in Braccagni, near Montepescali, at the point of bifurcation between the Pisa-Rome railway and the Siena-Grosseto line.
- Alberese station, located along the railway Pisa-Roma near Alberese, since 2010 only served by buses.
- Rispescia station, now disused, situated near Rispescia and was a place of occasional stop for regional trains.

=== Public transport ===
Until 2010, urban public transport was managed by the company RAMA, after the service was owned by Tiemme Toscana Mobilità, one of the companies of the consortium ONE Scarl to accomplish the contract stipulated with the Regione Toscana for the public transport in the 2018-2019 period. Intercity buses depart from the main bus station in Piazza Marconi. There are also several bus services going to Florence and other cities. A network of urban bus routes also operates in Grosseto, and the bus station serves as an interchange point between these, the intercity routes and extra-urban routes which extend into the rest of the Province of Grosseto. Since 1 November 2021, the public local transport is operated by Autolinee Toscane.

=== Port ===
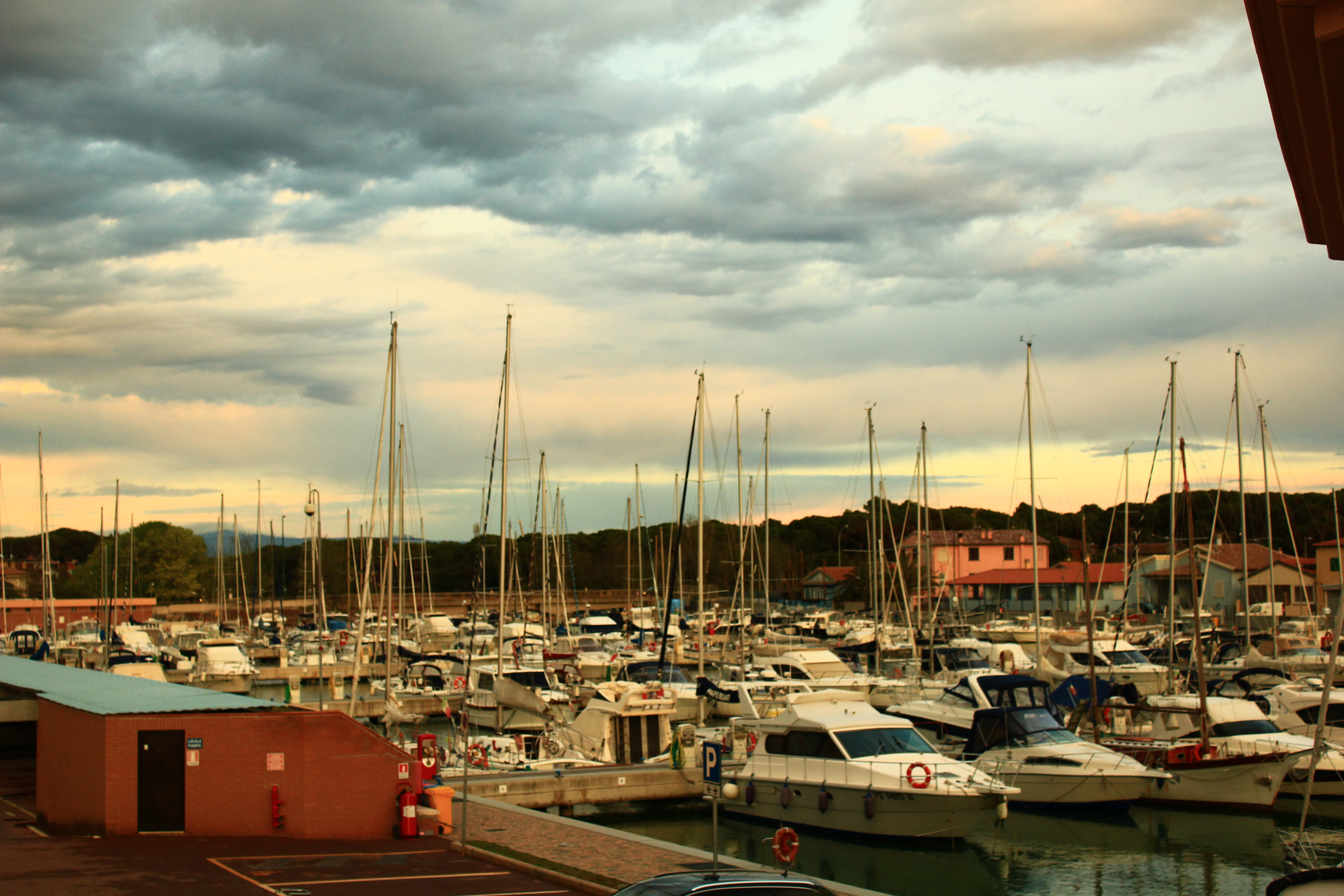
The modern tourist port of the city in Marina di Grosseto

The city has a modern tourist dock opened in 2004 in the seaside resort of Marina di Grosseto, at the mouth of the San Rocco Canal. For passenger traffic in the medium range, the main port is Porto Santo Stefano (40 km), with ferry for the islands of Giglio and Giannutri.

=== Airport ===
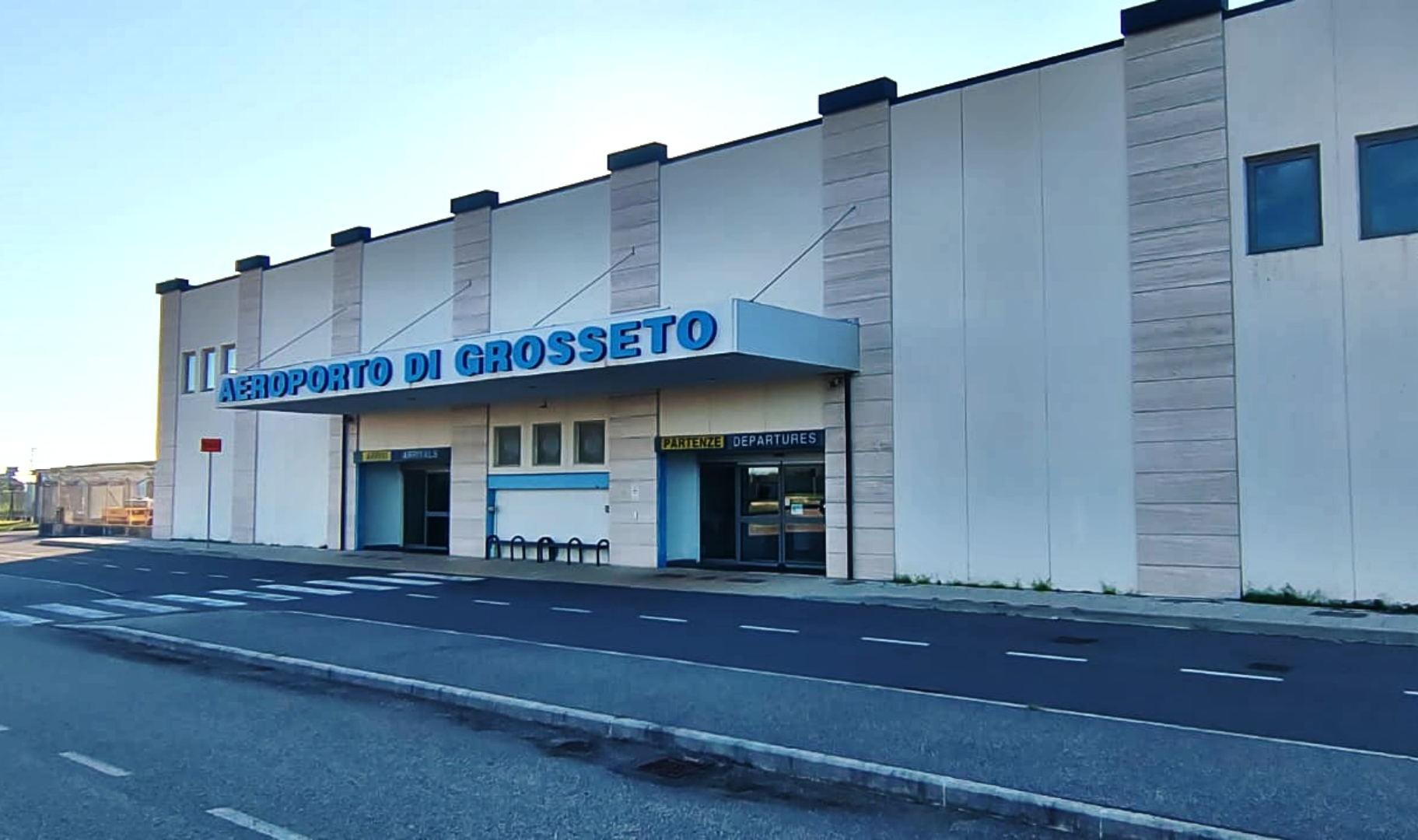
The entrance of the civilian airport

Grosseto is served by Grosseto Baccarini Airport, located west of the city. It is the biggest airport of Tuscany, the air base with the longest runway in Italy and has an international importance as a base for Nato missions in Europe. It is also a commercial airport by civilian charter flights and private aircraft, and has a terminal to accommodate international passengers.

With regard to domestic and international flights, the airports of reference are the Galileo Galilei Airport of Pisa and Rome-Fiumicino Airport.

=== Highways ===
European Route E78 Grosseto-Fano

The city is connected to Rome by the Via Aurelia highway which rejoins to the Grande Raccordo Anulare for connections with southern Italy, to Livorno by the Variante Aurelia highway, which rejoins the Autostrada A12 for connections with north-western Italy and to Siena by the Grosseto-Siena highway, which rejoins the Siena-Florence motorway link for connections with northern Italy and constitutes the first section of the European Route E78 Grosseto-Fano for connections with north-eastern Italy and the Adriatic coast.

== Notable people ==
- Andrea da Grosseto (13th century), writer and translator
- David Bellini (1972–2016), screenwriter and television writer
- Etrusco Benci (1905–1943), partisan
- Luciano Bianciardi (1922–1971), novelist
- Blind Fool Love (2005–2012), post-hardcore band
- Jessica Brando (1994–), singer
- Carlo Cassola (1917–1987), novelist, lived in Grosseto from 1948 to 1971
- Teresa Ciamagnini Fabbroni (1763–1811), socialite and intellectual
- Lucio Corsi (1993–), singer-songwriter
- Orsola Cozzi (1788–1831), novelist and nun
- Ginevra De Carolis (1985–), costume designer
- Tolomeo Faccendi (1905–1970), sculptor
- Ivo Faenzi (1932–), politician
- Francesco Falaschi (1961–), film director and screenwriter
- Francesco Falconi (1976–), fantasy writer
- Marco Giusti (1953–), film critic and writer
- Stefano Lodovichi (1983–), film director
- Egisto Macchi (1928–1992), composer
- Elsa Martinelli (1935–2017), actress
- Antonio Meocci (1912–1988), journalist, writer and partisan
- Francesco Mori (1975–), painter
- Ivo Pacini (1883–1959), sculptor
- Oreste Piccioni (1915–2002), physicist
- Luigi Pistilli (1929–1996), actor
- Quartiere Coffee (formed 2004), reggae band
- Alessandra Sensini (1970–), windsurfer, winner of four medals in the Olympic Games
- Francesco Turbanti (1988–), actor

== International relations ==
=== Twin towns – sister cities ===
Grosseto is twinned with:

- Birkirkara, Malta
- Cottbus, Germany
- Dimitrovgrad, Bulgaria
- Kashiwara, Japan
- Montreuil, France
- Narbonne, France
- Saintes-Maries-de-la-Mer, France

== See also ==
- Diocese of Grosseto
- Andrea of Grosseto
