= Palazzo Tognetti =

Palace in Grosseto, Italy

- Interactive map of the Palazzo Tognetti area

General information
- Type: palace
- Architectural style: Art Nouveau
- Location: Corso Carducci/Via Cairoli; Grosseto, Tuscany; Italy
- Coordinates: 42°45′41.6″N 11°06′47.4″E
- Named for: Tognetti brothers
- Completed: 1910

Technical details
- Floor count: 3

Design and construction
- Engineer: Giuseppe Luciani

Palazzo Tognetti is an Art Nouveau building in Grosseto, Italy. It was designed by Giuseppe Luciani and completed in 1910. The building is located on Corso Carducci, the city center's main street, and is considered one of the best examples of Liberty style in southern Tuscany.

== History ==
The palace was commissioned by the Tognetti brothers who owned a news agency in Grosseto. It was designed by engineer-artist Giuseppe Luciani and inaugurated in 1910.

== Description ==
=== Exterior ===
The building, with a rectangular plan, rises over three floors plus an attic. Its façades, highlighted by string courses and divided into regular sections by fluted pilasters at the base and at the height of the capitals, feature rich decorative elements in artificial stone. These include floral motifs around the openings and on the long balustrade of the upper terrace. The ground floor, with its notable wooden shopfronts in the corner, uses rough cement as a base, finished with a classic-style cornice. The entrances are framed in artificial stone, which also adorns the openings on the upper floors, featuring floral designs. Vining motifs are repeated in the wrought-iron railings of the balconies that mark the centers of the two façades and in the lunettes of the doors and windows. Together with the intricate patterns of the balustrades and the crown molding, these elements represent the main Art Nouveau decorative motif. Another notable feature is the color contrast between the gray artificial stone—a "modern" material widely used for decorative parts at the time—and the light-colored plastered surfaces of the façades.

=== Interior ===
Inside, the entrance hall, weakly illuminated by the glazed overdoor, retains its colorful hexagonal cement tile flooring and features a spiral staircase at the back with a terrazzo finish, cast-iron balusters, and a wooden handrail. The aesthetic impact of the staircase, significant in the design, diminishes in the realization due to its location and, despite the skylight, its almost complete lack of natural light. The steep winding and limited space make the staircase particularly narrow. However, the space expands on the top floor due to the skylight, which is adorned with an elegant stucco frame with paired corbels at the corners. The apartments, two per floor, are used for both office and residential purposes.

== Critical reception ==
Quattrocchi (2006) observes that the building stands out as a unique piece in the work of architect Luciani, who was representative of an academic, classicist culture. Although Luciani's commitment to Art Nouveau is described as "late and occasional", the result is noted for its "great coherence and freshness", particularly "in the intricate vegetal motifs that frame the openings and enliven the railings and balustrades". The design innovations are evident in the floor plan, "centered around a spiral staircase that serves the apartments on various floors, reflecting the best examples of Art Nouveau". However, this innovation is somewhat "constrained by the limited space available for the staircase ramp".

== Bibliography ==
- Cappellini, Perla; Dominici, Laura (2004). Le stagioni del liberty in Toscana. Itinerari tra il 1880 e il 1930. Spoleto: Del Gallo Editore.
- Innocenti, Mario; Innocenti, Elena (1993). Grosseto:briciole di storia. Cartoline e documenti d'epoca 1899-1944. Grosseto: Innocenti Editore. pp. 211–213.
- Mariagrazia Celuzza; Mauro Papa, eds. (2013). Grosseto visibile. Guida alla città e alla sua arte pubblica. Arcidosso: Edizioni Effigi.
- Enrico Crispolti; Anna Mazzanti; Luca Quattrocchi, eds. (2006). Arte in Maremma nella prima metà del Novecento. Milano: Silvana Editoriale.
- Maria Adriana Giusti, ed. (1996). Le età del Liberty in Toscana. Florence: Octavo-Franco Cantini Editore.
