= Palazzina Tempesti =

Palace in Grosseto, Italy

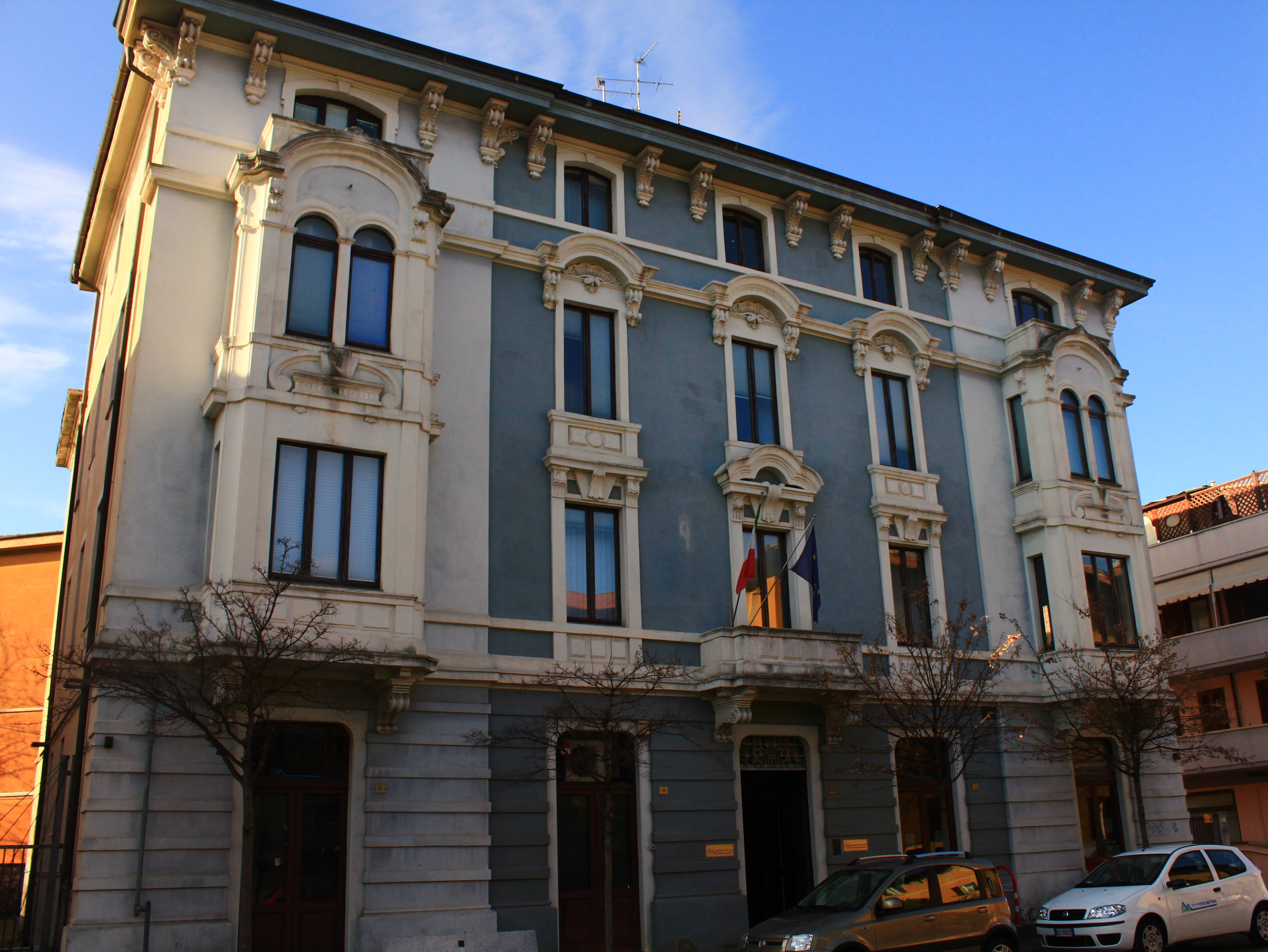
- Interactive map of the Palazzina Tempesti area

General information
- Type: palace
- Architectural style: Eclectism; Art Nouveau
- Location: Viale Goffredo Mameli 10; Grosseto, Tuscany
- Coordinates: 42°45′56.2″N 11°06′29.6″E
- Named for: Giuseppe Tempesti
- Completed: 1913
- Client: Giuseppe Tempesti
- Owner: Acquedotto del Fiora

Technical details
- Floor count: 4

Design and construction
- Architect: Corrado Andreini

Palazzina Tempesti is a building in Grosseto, Italy. It is located on Viale Goffredo Mameli, the street leading from the historic center to the railway station, and was designed by the architect-engineer Corrado Andreini in 1913.

== History ==
The building was constructed in 1913, designed by Corrado Andreini as a private residence for Giuseppe Tempesti, who was the director of the Monte dei Paschi di Siena branch in Grosseto. This project was part of a larger urban planning initiative that began with the city's first master plan of 1912, also drafted by Andreini. The plan designated the Porta Nuova suburb as the main zone for expansion, with Viale Mameli (then Viale della Stazione) planned as a major thoroughfare leading into the historic center. As such, it required distinguished architecture to emphasize its importance.

After its residential use ceased in the post-war period, the building was repurposed as the headquarters for the local water utility company, Acquedotto del Fiora.

== Description ==
The building has four floors and a rectangular floor plan.

The main facade, facing Viale Mameli, features both Art Nouveau and Neoclassical elements and is finished in a sky-blue plaster. The ground floor front is adorned with horizontal relief bands and is separated from the upper floor by a decorative cornice. The three upper floors exhibit a blue-and-white color scheme, achieved through the contrast between the plaster and the stucco decorations around the windows. Prominent on the main facade are two projecting bow windows, framed by decorative pediments. Additionally, a cornice divides the top floor from the main floor, while a series of classic-style brackets support the cornice.

The interior, which has been remodeled several times, still retains the entrance hall with its floral-patterned ceiling and the original staircase with its balustrade.

== Critical reception ==
Quattrocchi (2006) highlights how Andreini employs "an eclectic repertoire of classical ornamentation" in this building and notes that "while the historicist repertoire prevails over the modernist language, it is interesting to observe the presence of two elaborate bow windows on the facade, a decidedly unusual element in Grosseto's architecture".

== Bibliography ==
- Grosseto fuori Porta Nuova. Lo sviluppo di Grosseto a nord delle mura dalla metà dell'Ottocento al secondo dopoguerra. Grosseto: Innocenti Editore. 2009.
- Cappellini, Perla; Dominici, Laura (2004). Le stagioni del liberty in Toscana. Itinerari tra il 1880 e il 1930. Spoleto: Del Gallo Editore.
- Letizia Franchina, ed. (1995). Tra Ottocento e Novecento. Grosseto e la Maremma alla ricerca di una nuova immagine. Soprintendenza per i beni ambientali e architettonici per le province di Siena e Grosseto.
- Innocenti, Mario; Innocenti, Elena (1993). Grosseto:briciole di storia. Cartoline e documenti d'epoca 1899-1944. Grosseto: Innocenti Editore. pp. 211–213.
- Mariagrazia Celuzza; Mauro Papa, eds. (2013). Grosseto visibile. Guida alla città e alla sua arte pubblica. Arcidosso: Edizioni Effigi.
- Enrico Crispolti; Anna Mazzanti; Luca Quattrocchi, eds. (2005). Arte in Maremma nella prima metà del Novecento. Milan: Silvana Editoriale.
- Maria Adriana Giusti, ed. (1996). Le età del Liberty in Toscana. Florence: Octavo-Franco Cantini Editore.
