= Timeline of Grosseto =

The following is a timeline of the history of the city of Grosseto, Tuscany, Italy.

== Prior to 12th century ==
- 803 AD – First mention of Grosseto: Hildebrandus from Lucca purchased the church of St. George in locus Grossito by the bishop of Lucca Jacobus.
- 973 AD – The village of Grosseto is documented as curtis cum castrum, including both the inhabited settlement and a fortified castle area.

== 12th century ==
- 1137 – The settlement and the castle were besieged by the imperial army of Lothair III, led by duke Henry of Bavaria.
- 1138 – Pope Innocent II transferred to Grosseto the episcopal see of Rusellae, and officially declared Grosseto as a civitas (city). Rolandus, bishop of Rusellae, became the first bishop of the new diocese of Grosseto.
- 1151 – The local ruling class (the boni homines) signed an agreement with Siena, through which they assumed a series of obligations and responsibilities of an economic and military nature.
- 1179 – In conflict with the people of Grosseto, Count Ildebrandino VII began a project to build a new settlement on the Moscona hill, but it ultimately failed.

== 13th century ==
- 1203 – Count Ildebrandino VIII established an agreement with Siena for the salt trade. The presence of an early municipal government managed by the consuls in Grosseto is documented.
- 1204 – The municipal government of Grosseto was recognized by Count Ildebrandino VIII with the promulgation of the Carta Libertatis, which defined the jurisdictional and economic relations between the local population and the Counts of Aldobrandeschi.
- 1213 – Manto di Guglielmo appointed viscount of Batignano by the Aldobrandeschi.
- 1216 – Giovanni de Papa served as podestà, the earliest documented holder of the office in the city.
- 1221
  - New agreement for the local commerce between the Aldobrandeschi and Siena.
  - The Palazzo del Comune (Municipal Palace) is attested.
  - Emperor Frederick II granted protection to the city and the county as part of his imperial domain.
- 1222 – Reconfirmation of the Carta Libertatis.
- 1224 – The people of Grosseto did not honor the agreements made with Siena and the counts in 1221. On September 8, the city was besieged, set on fire, and violently conquered by the Sienese. The people of Grosseto were forced to sign an agreement of subordinacy. From this moment, the "subordinate alliance" of Grosseto with the Republic of Siena began.
- 1236 – Count Guglielmo Aldobrandeschi sided with Pope Gregory IX against the imperial power of Frederick II, who was supported by the Sienese. Rebelling of the people of Grosseto against the count, incited by Siena.
- 1240 – After accusing Count Guglielmo of treason, the empreror occupied Grosseto and designated it as one of the seats of the imperial vicar in the former March of Tuscany, placed under the direct control of Pandolfo di Fasanella.
- 1243 – Emperor Frederick II began residing in Grosseto during the winter, due to its strategic position in the center of the peninsula and to practice falconry.
- 1246 – Informed of the conspiracy of Capaccio, orchestrated by Fasanella himself, the emperor hastily left Grosseto in the month of March.
- 1251
  - Grosseto controlled by the Sienese in the name of the emperor.
  - A hospital managed by Santa Maria della Scala opened in June.
- 1259 – Grosseto refused to recognize King Manfred's authority, aligning itself with the Guelph faction. Ghibelline Siena occupied the city and expelled the political enemies.
- 1261 – Greater Sienese control over Grosseto, with the obligation to appoint a Captain of the People from Siena, in order to avoid King Manfred's anti-Sienese policy.
- 1262 – In June, Grosseto and Siena ratified a treaty of mutual societas, attempting to avoid further escalation with the imperial power.
- 1264 – It was permitted for the exiles of the Guelph faction to return to the city, as long as they adhered to the municipal statutes and pledged allegiance to both Siena and King Manfred.
- 1266
  - March 6 – After Manfred's death, the Aldobrandeschi led by Count Ildebrandino the Red occupied Grosseto and established new agreements with the people, in an attempt to oust Siena from control of the territory.
  - July 11 – Siena took control of the city again, entrusting it to its representatives.
- 1271 – After the defeat at Colle Val d'Elsa the previous year, the Guelph faction prevailed in Siena. In Grosseto, it led to the rise of the pro-Sienese faction, which brought a period of peace between the two cities (pax guelfa).
- 1277 – New agreement between the two cities, signed by podestà Scozia Tolomei from Siena, as veram et firmam unionem, societatem et compagniam ("true and solid union, society and company"), which transformed Siena's hegemonic claims into a nearly equal footing with the ally.
- 1282 – Treaty by which Siena became guarantor of Grosseto's protection against the attempts of the Aldobrandeschi to reestablish feudal authority.
- 1289 – Transformation of the former church of San Fortunato into the new church and convent of St. Francis.
- 1294 – Construction of the cathedral by architect Sozzo Rustichini began.

== 14th century ==
- 1310 – Failed rebellion led by Bino degli Abati del Malia, son of Abate di Manto of Batignano, in an attempt to break away from the alliance with Siena.
- 1312 – Taking advantage of Henry VII's descent into Italy, Bino led a second rebellion and took control of Grosseto.
- 1317 – Treaty of alliance between Vanni, who succeeded his father Bino, and Siena, which tolerated the almost "signoria" of the Abati of Malia over the city, while maintaining a certain control.
- 1318 – Ombrone river flood.
- 1325 – A contingent of knights from Grosseto participated in support of the Sienese at the battle of Altopascio against the Florentines.
- 1328 – In September, Grosseto was besieged by imperial troops of Duke Louis the Bavarian and the antipope Nicholas V, who aimed to take the city away from the Guelphs and return it to the Aldobrandeschi. After four days of siege, the imperial army withdrew unsuccessfully.
- 1331 – A peace treaty was signed between Siena and the Aldobrandeschi, which also involved the Abati del Malia.
- 1333 – Serious flood.
- 1334 – Vanni degli Abati del Malia died at the beginning of the year. On January 13, the Sienese took advantage of this to occupy Grosseto and transport Vanni's two sons and his brother, Abbatino, to Siena as prisoners; they were later released but with the obligation to remain in Siena. The Republic reformed the statutes of the municipality of Grosseto and ordered the construction of a Cassero to defend the city.
- 1335
  - July 25 – The Abati del Malia, led by Abbatino, expelled the Sienese military garrison and halted the construction of the Cassero, regaining control of Grosseto.
  - November 23 – The city was again besieged by the Sienese, but the Abati managed to maintain control with the help of Pisa.
- 1336 – Definitive conquest of Grosseto by Siena, which reached an agreement with Abbatino for the cession of the city in June.
- 1338 – Sienese measures decreed the end of the autonomy for Grosseto and its full incorporation into the Republic of Siena.
- 1345 – Reconstruction of the city walls by the Sienese and completion of the Cassero.
- 1348 – Black Death plague. A slow decline began for Grosseto that would last for centuries.
- 1355 – Confirmation of the old imperial privileges by Charles IV, which led to a new rebellion immediately suppressed by the Sienese.
- 1357 – Pact establishing the transfer of the imperial privileges of Grosseto to Siena and the request for a symbolic act of submission, through an annual donation on the occasion of Siena's patron saint festival.
- 1363 – Plague decimated Grosseto's population.
- 1364 – Concession of privileges and rights to attract new inhabitants to Grosseto.
- 1368 – Famine.
- 1370 – Severe famine that further reduced the population.
- 1371 – Measures to repopulate Grosseto.
- 1374 – Plague and famine.
- 1383 – Plague and famine.
- 1386 – The ancient saltworks on Lake Prile were considered inadequate, beginning their dismantling.
- 1389 – Plague and famine.
- 1391 – Famine.
- 1399 – Plague.

== 15th century ==
- 1402 – Bell tower of the cathedral built.
- 1419 – Statuto dei Paschi established, initiating the exploitation of pastures and extensive cultivation of cereals in Grosseto and Maremma.
- 1421 – New municipal statute of Grosseto.
- 1430 – Palazzo dei Priori and Palazzo del Podestà renovated.
- 1465 – Serious pestilence that caused over 1,000 deaths.
- 1466 – Population decreased to 260.
- 1467 – Attempt to attract new inhabitants, through the construction of some houses and a drinking water cistern.
- 1475 – Interior of the cathedral renovated, with a new baptismal font by Antonio Ghini.

== 16th century ==
- 1525 – Population at its lower peak: 150.
- 1532 – Proposal by architect Baldassarre Peruzzi for the rebuilding of the walls.
- 1540 – Cathedral renovated by Antonio Maria Lari.
- 1541 – Part of the city walls restored by Lari with Giorgio di Pietro.
- 1544
  - Hayreddin Barbarossa's pirates plundered the coast.
  - A religious and philosophical circle led by Achille Benvoglienti emerged, promoting Protestant reformist ideas.
- 1552 – War of Siena began.
- 1553 – Reconstruction of part of the walls and moats in preparation for war.
- 1554 – Grosseto's resistance to the siege by Medici troops led by Federigo da Montauto.
- 1555 – Grosseto occupied by the French troops and designated as a prominent military base, led by Blaise de Monluc.
- 1559 – Treaty of Cateau-Cambrésis. Siena's territories assigned to Florence under the government of duke Cosimo I de' Medici. The French troops left Grosseto and the Florentine army led by Chiappino Vitelli entered the city.
- 1560 – First visit of duke Cosimo I de' Medici.
- 1561 – A captain of justice established in Grosseto.
- 1562 – Second visit of duke Cosimo I de' Medici.
- 1565 – Construction of the Medici walls began, supervised by Baldassarre Lanci.
- 1566 – Bastione Maiano completed.
- 1568 – The notary Fabio Cioni was tried and convicted for heresy by the Inquisition.
- 1569 – Grand Duchy of Tuscany established.
- 1571
  - Bastione Molino a Vento completed.
  - Lanci died, and his son Marino took over.
- 1572 – Population: 750.
- 1574 – Marino Lanci died from malaria. Architect Simone Genga took over.
- 1575 – Bastione Cavallerizza completed.
- 1577 – Bastione Garibaldi and Bastione Rimembranza completed.
- 1585 – Poor Clares' convent established.
- 1592 – Ufficio dei Fiumi e Fossi established by grand duke Ferdinando I de' Medici.
- 1593 – Construction of the Medici walls completed with the Bastione Fortezza.
- 1596 – Population: 1,654.

== 17th century ==
- 1614 – Grand duke Cosimo II de' Medici ordered the construction of the Canale Navigante.
- 1622 – Population: 2,500.
- 1634 – Church of St. Clare consecrated.
- 1639 – Canale Navigante completed.
- 1640 – Population: 1,340.
- 1676 – Population: 1,308.
- 1694 – Grand duke Cosimo III de' Medici ordered the construction of a second Canale Navigante, designed by Giuliano Ciaccheri.
- 1695 – Ufficio dell'Abbondanza established.

== 18th century ==
- 1704 – Episcopal Seminary opened by bishop Giacomo Falconetti.
- 1715 – Second Canale Navigante completed.
- 1716 – Episcopal Seminary closed.
- 1737 – With the extinction of the Medici dynasty, the Grand Duchy of Tuscany was assigned to the House of Habsburg-Lorraine.
- 1745 – Population: 884.
- 1749 – First topographic map of Grosseto, by military engineer Edward Warren.
- 1755 – Porta Nuova reopened.
- 1758 – Saltworks of Trappola closed.
- 1760 – Investigation on the Maremma by Pompeo Neri.
- 1765 – Privatization of the land assets of the Opera del Duomo of Grosseto (10,000 hectares), divided into approximately 30 estates and sold to private individuals.
- 1766 – Lower Province of Siena established by grand duke Peter Leopold, with Grosseto as its capital.
- 1778 – Magistrato dei Paschi di Siena abolished.
- 1780 – Regulation for the Estatatura issued.
- 1783 – Tuscan administrative reform of municipalities: Batignano and Istia d'Ombrone annexed to Grosseto.
- 1784 – Population: 1,850.
- 1787 – Misericordia Hospital renovated.
- 1793 – Fort San Rocco completed.

== 19th century ==
- 1803 – Palazzo Ariosti purchased by bishop Fabrizio Selvi as the new episcopal residence.
- 1808 – Antonio Castellini appointed maire by the French.
- 1815 – Defeat of Napoleon and Treaty of Paris: Giovanni Giuggioli appointed gonfalonier by grand duke Leopold II.
- 1819 – Teatro degli Industri opened.
- 1823 – First cadastral map of Grosseto, by engineer Gaetano Becherucci.
- 1828 – Grand duke Leopold II ordered the extensive reclamation of Lake Prile.
- 1833 – Population: 2,732.
- 1842 – Public kindergarten established by grand duke Leopold II.
- 1846 – Public square renovated by engineer Angiolo Cianferoni.
- 1854
  - Cemetery of Misericordia established.
  - Gorarella estate purchased by Vincenzo Ricasoli.
- 1855 – Barbanella estate purchased by Bettino Ricasoli.
- 1856 – Grosseto Prison built.
- 1859 – Grand Duchy of Tuscany annexed to the Kingdom of Piedmont-Sardinia.
- 1860 – Biblioteca Chelliana founded by canon Giovanni Chelli.
- 1861 – Kingdom of Italy established.
- 1864 – Grosseto railway station opened.
- 1865 – Domenico Ponticelli appointed first mayor of Grosseto by King Victor Emmanuel II.
- 1866 – Porta Nuova demolished.
- 1873 – New Town Hall completed.
- 1879 – Kindergarten transferred to a new school building and named after Victor Emmanuel II.
- 1885 – Post Office building completed.
- 1888 – Royal Elementary School building completed.
- 1889 – Benedetto Ponticelli became the first elected mayor of Grosseto.
- 1890 – The new Stella d'Italia Hotel opened.
- 1892
  - Teatro degli Industri reopened after renovation by architect Augusto Corbi.
  - Courthouse renovated.
  - Piazza Baccarini created.
- 1894 – Palazzo Berti built.
- 1896 – Bank of Italy branch established on Piazza Socci.
- 1897 – Estatatura abolished.
- 1898 – Palazzo Mensini completed.

== 20th century ==
- 1901 – Population: 8,843.
- 1903
  - Palazzo Aldobrandeschi by architect Lorenzo Porciatti completed.
  - Palazzo Cappelli built.
- 1905 – Montepescali annexed to Grosseto.
- 1908 – Palazzo Stefanopoli-Porciatti renovated.
- 1909 – Villino Andreini built.
- 1910 – Palazzo Tognetti built.
- 1911 – Palazzo del Genio Civile completed.
- 1912
  - First city master plan, by architect Corrado Andreini.
  - Palazzo del Monte dei Paschi opened.
  - May – Grand Hotel Bastiani opened.
  - May 13 – Unione Ginnico Sportiva Grossetana founded.
- 1913
  - Palazzina Tempesti built.
  - Villino Pastorelli built.
- 1920 – The socialists won the municipal election. Tito Bolognesi acted as mayor.
- 1921 – Fascist raid on Grosseto, forcing the socialist municipal government to resign.
- 1922 – Liberal Benedetto Pallini, backed by the fascists, became mayor.
- 1925 – Bank of Italy building renovated.
- 1926
  - October 11 – Cinema Marraccini opened.
  - December 30 – Ado Scaramucci appointed fascist podestà.
- 1927 – Casa del Fascio and Palazzo del Governo opened.
- 1928 – Villino Magrassi built.
- 1932 – New Palazzo delle Poste by architect Angiolo Mazzoni opened.
- 1933 – Porta Corsica opened.
- 1936 – Second city master plan, by engineer Giulio Sabatini.
- 1937 – Church of the Miracolous Medal consecrated.
- 1939 – Old Palazzo dei Priori demolished.
- 1940
  - Consorzio Agrario Building opened.
  - Royal Industrial Technical School building completed.
  - Church of St. Joseph consecrated.
- 1943
  - April 26 – First bombing of Grosseto took place: 134 casualties.
  - October 25 – Alceo Ercolani appointed prefect and head of the province by the Italian Social Republic.
- 1944
  - March 22 – The Maiano Lavacchio massacre took place.
  - June 12 – The San Leopoldo massacre took place.
  - June 15 – Liberation of Grosseto from Nazi fascism.
  - June 17 – Communist Lio Lenzi appointed mayor by the National Liberation Committee and the Allied Military Government.
  - November 2 – Ombrone river flood.
- 1946 – The Italian Communist Party won the first municipal elections after World War II, with Lenzi confirmed as mayor.
- 1948 – Reconstruction plan, by engineer Giovanni Cavallucci.
- 1951 – Church of St. Joseph Cottolengo consecrated.
- 1952
  - July 6 – Biblioteca Chelliana reopened, under the direction of Luciano Bianciardi.
  - October 12 – Municipal Stadium opened.
- 1955 – Civic Archaeological Museum reopened, under the direction of Aldo Mazzolai.
- 1958
  - February 22 – State Archives of Grosseto established.
  - April 26 – Basilica of the Sacred Heart of Jesus consecrated.
- 1959 – Third city master plan, by engineer Giulio Sabatini.
- 1964 – Grosseto Courthouse built.
- 1966 – Ombrone river flood.
- 1971
  - Fourth city master plan, by architect Luigi Piccinato.
  - Civic Museum of Natural History founded by naturalist Giuseppe Guerrini.
- 1974 – New Misericordia Hospital opened.
- 1975 – New Archaeological and Art Museum of Maremma opened in the former courthouse on Piazza Baccarini.
- 1977 – New Bank of Italy building completed.
- 1978 – Cosimini Building by architect Ludovico Quaroni completed.
- 1989 – Church of the Holy Family consecrated.
- 1996 – Fifth city master plan, by architects Alberto Samonà, Paolo Borghi, and Giovanni Romano.

== 21st century ==
- 2009 – New Museum of Natural History of Maremma opened on Piazza della Palma.
- 2011 – Population: 78,630.
- 2019 – Museo Collezione Gianfranco Luzzetti opened.
- 2021 – Population: 81,503.

== See also ==
- History of Grosseto
- List of mayors of Grosseto
- State Archives of Grosseto (state archives)

Other cities in the macroregion of Central Italy:^{(it)}

- Timeline of Ancona, Marche region
- Timeline of Arezzo, Tuscany region
- Timeline of Florence, Tuscany
- Timeline of Livorno, Tuscany
- Timeline of Lucca, Tuscany
- Timeline of Perugia, Umbria region
- Timeline of Pisa, Tuscany
- Timeline of Pistoia, Tuscany
- Timeline of Prato, Tuscany
- Timeline of Rome, Lazio region
- Timeline of Siena, Tuscany
