= Museo archeologico e d'arte della Maremma =

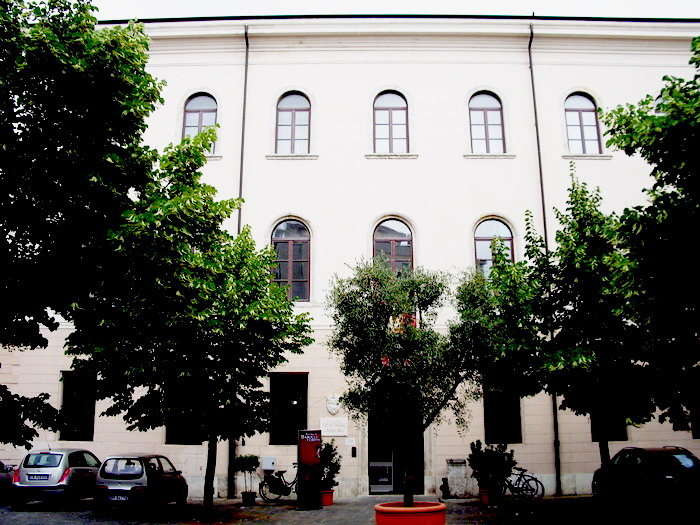
- Former name: Museo civico archeologico di Grosseto
- Established: 1 March 1860; 166 years ago
- Location: Piazza Baccarini, Grosseto, Tuscany, Italy
- Coordinates: 42°45′41.5″N 11°06′49.31″E
- Type: Archaeological museum Art museum
- Founder: Giovanni Chelli
- Director: Anna Bonelli (since 2019)
- Curator: Luca Giannini (since 2024)
- Owner: Comune di Grosseto
- Website: maam.comune.grosseto.it

The Museo archeologico e d'arte della Maremma is an archaeological and art museum in Grosseto, Tuscany, Italy. It preserves a rich archaeological collection spanning from the Paleolithic to the late Middle Ages, with a special focus on the Etruscan and Roman periods. It serves as a key center for the study and documentation of the archaeological history of the Maremma, particularly the ancient city of Rusellae.

Founded in 1860 by canon Giovanni Chelli as part of the Chelliana Library, it became municipal property in 1865 and was established as an independent museum in 1955. In 1975, with the opening of its new display in the former courthouse on Piazza Baccarini, it was renamed the Museum of Archaeology and Art of the Maremma, incorporating the Museum of Sacred Art of the Diocese of Grosseto, originally founded in 1933.

== History ==
The first museum in Grosseto was founded on 1 March 1860 by canon Giovanni Chelli, a progressive priest involved in the Tuscan Risorgimento. Chelli had been collecting books, artworks, and archaeological finds to establish a cultural center and promote literacy. His collection, initially housed in the bishop's palace, reflected the 19th-century antiquarian style, displaying a mix of rare and precious objects without strict scientific criteria.

After attempts to gain official state recognition failed, Chelli donated his collection and library to the city in 1865, forming the Biblioteca Chelliana, which also included the museum. However, frequent relocations and lack of support led to instability. By the late 19th century, many important artifacts were transferred to Florence's Topographical Museum of Etruria, causing a decline in Grosseto's institution.

In the early 20th century, canon Antonio Cappelli reorganized the museum and library in the Palazzo Mensini on Via Mazzini, but later neglected the civic museum to focus on founding a diocesan art museum. During World War II, the museum suffered severe damage from bombings, looting, and the 1944 flood. After the war, writer Luciano Bianciardi helped reorganize the library and museum, though the archaeological collection remained marginal.

The real revival came with Aldo Mazzolai (1923–2009), who after the war began rescuing and preserving archaeological finds from the Maremma region, often threatened by looting during the land reform. In 1955, the Civic Archaeological Museum of Grosseto was officially established, independent from the library, with Mazzolai as its first director. A permanent exhibition opened in 1958, focusing on local Etruscan and Roman sites such as Rusellae and Vetulonia.

As the collection grew, space became inadequate. A project to relocate the museum to the former courthouse building was completed in 1974. The following year, it was merged with the Diocesan Museum of Sacred Art, creating the Museum of Archaeology and Art of the Maremma (Museo archeologico e d'arte della Maremma), inaugurated in 1975. The museum covered prehistoric to Renaissance periods across 27 rooms.

Mazzolai directed the museum until 1984, when Mariagrazia Celuzza took over, modernizing methods and later overseeing a major renovation between 1992 and 1999, which reorganized the exhibitions into 36 rooms tracing Maremma's history from prehistory to the Middle Ages.

In 2019, after Celuzza's retirement, management of the museum was integrated with the Chelliana Library.

== Sources ==
- Bonelli, Anna; Corso, Letizia (January–April 1994). "La biblioteca comunale Chelliana: note per una descrizione storica". Culture del testo.
- Celuzza, Mariagrazia (2007). Museo archeologico e d'arta della Maremma – Museo d'arte sacra della diocesi di Grosseto. Guida. Siena: Nuova Immagine Editrice.
- Mazzolai, Aldo (1977). Grosseto. Il museo archeologico della Maremma. Grosseto.
- Semplici, Andrea (2012). La Maremma dei musei. Viaggio emozionale nell'arte, la storia, la natura, le tradizioni del territorio grossetano. Arcidosso: Edizioni Effigi.
