= Biblioteca Chelliana =

Public library in Grosseto, Italy

Coordinates: 42.761278°N 11.112139°E

- Biblioteca comunale Chelliana
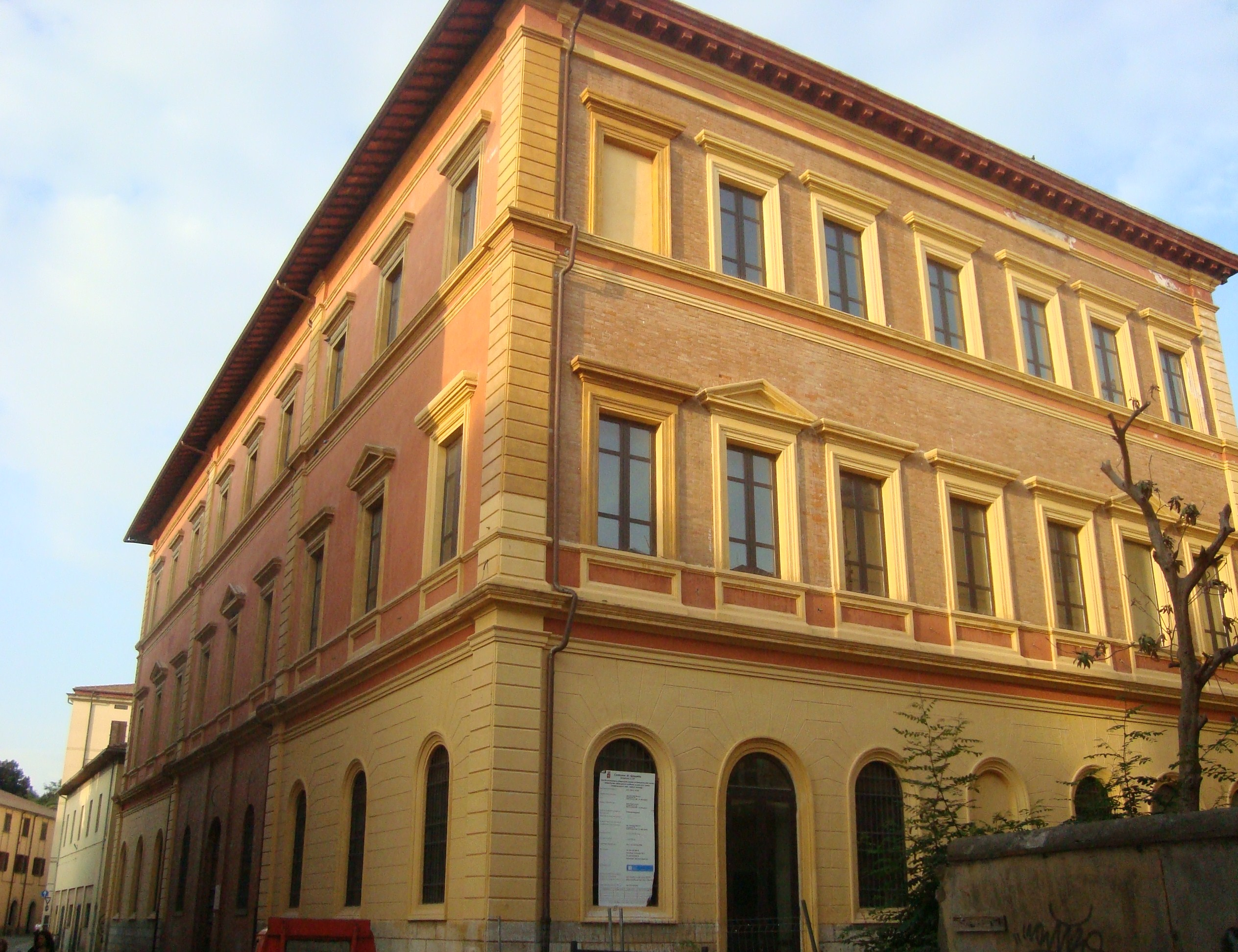
- Palazzo Mensini
- Location: Grosseto, Tuscany
- Established: 1 March 1860; 165 years ago
- Branches: 2

Collection
- Size: 130,732 books and other items

Other information
- Director: Anna Bonelli (since 2016)
- Website: Official website

The Biblioteca Chelliana (Chelliana Library) is a public library in Grosseto, Italy, founded in 1860 by Giovanni Chelli. In 1865, it became a public library as Biblioteca comunale Chelliana. It currently occupies the Palazzo Mensini built in 1898.

Italian writer Luciano Bianciardi was the director of the library from 1951 to 1954.

== History ==
=== Giovanni Chelli and the founding of the library ===
The establishment of a public library in the city of Grosseto was due to the cultural and political initiative of Canon Giovanni Chelli, an erudite from Siena and canon of the Cathedral of San Lorenzo. Chelli was a controversial figure, a republican and liberal priest who supported the Italian unification and opposed Pope Pius IX. In Grosseto, Chelli was the primary cultural promoter and recognized the need for a civic library. On 30 December 1858, the canon proposed the creation of a library to the Cathedral Chapter, having already collected a significant number of books and some archaeological items. The Chapter agreed, appointing him as the director and allocating three rooms in the Episcopal Palace, since the see was vacant at the time.

Chelli independently sourced furniture and sought donations to expand the library's collection. Early supporters included Bishop Giovanni Domenico Mensini, who bequeathed his personal library, and Vicar Capitular Domenico Pizzetti. These contributions formed the initial collection of around 5,000 volumes, which later grew to 9,000 through additional donations. The first library in Grosseto, combined with the civic archaeological museum, was inaugurated on 1 March 1860. Chelli, with librarian Federigo Riccioli, continued to seek support from wealthy individuals locally and nationally. Significant donations came from Grosseto's mayor Angelo Ferri. After Italian unification, Chelli appealed to various prominent figures, including Minister Marco Minghetti, Baron Bettino Ricasoli, King Victor Emmanuel II, and French Emperor Napoleon III.

Despite the economic and social backwardness of Grosseto, mainly due to malaria, Chelli faced financial challenges, as support from the Cathedral Chapter was minimal. The diocese awaited a new bishop, and there was no commitment to a project lacking higher ecclesiastical approval. Chelli sought state support for the library in 1862 but was advised to donate it to the municipality instead. After initial hesitation, he did so in 1864, and the municipal library was officially inaugurated on 30 March 1865, named after its founder.

=== Between the 19th and 20th centuries ===
The library's collection continued to increase, especially following a substantial donation from engineer Alessandro Manetti in 1865. By May 1866, the library held about 50,000 volumes, organized into five sections according to the Brunet classification system. In 1867, after nine years without a bishop, Pope Pius IX appointed Anselmo Fauli as the new bishop of Grosseto. Fearing the library's closure, Chelli urged the government to purchase the Episcopal Palace. His fears were justified, and the library was evicted from the diocesan residence. Giovanni Chelli died in October 1869. The library and the archaeological section were temporarily separated, and housed in different buildings. A series of relocations began, which eventually led to the dispersal of much of the accumulated collection.

Despite the appointment of a new director, Giovanni Battista Ponticelli, and a librarian, Professor Agostino Barbini, the library remained in a precarious state due to a lack of attention from the municipal administration. After Barbini's death in 1902, Giovanni Pizzetti, a former mayor of Grosseto, became the new director. Pizzetti quickly recognized the library's dire condition and appealed to the municipal administration for professional staff. His political influence led to the appointment of Professor Alfredo Segrè as librarian on 20 October 1909, who was tasked with reordering the inventories. In 1910, Segrè cataloged and described thirty-nine manuscripts for the Inventories of Manuscripts in Italian Libraries by Giuseppe Mazzatinti and Albano Sorbelli. He also included approximately 25,000 volumes in a card catalog organized according to the Staderini system. Significant donations during this period included collections from mathematician Adele Capuzzo Dolcetta (1905) and patriot Nicola Guerrazzi (1912). After Pizzetti resigned as director on 27 December 1909, the direction was entrusted to a board led by architect Lorenzo Porciatti, who served at least until 1913. Segrè remained responsible for the organization of the Chelliana Library until 1920.

=== The relocation to Palazzo Mensini and World War II ===
Pizzetti resumed the directorship from 1921 to 1923, after which the library and museum were entrusted to Canon Antonio Cappelli, who had been on the board of directors since 1904. Cappelli moved the Chelliana Library to Palazzo Mensini on Via Mazzini, the former seminary and home of the Royal Gymnasium and Lyceum. This stable residence and Cappelli's careful management led to significant growth in the library's collection through numerous purchases and donations. By 1934, Professor Angelo Davoli from the Italian Bibliographic School noted a collection of thirty-two incunabula, several hundred manuscripts and 16th-century prints, and a total of about 70,000 volumes.

Cappelli died on 28 July 1939, and was succeeded in December by Maria Emilia Broli, the first director with formal expertise in library science. Broli criticized her predecessor for not implementing precautionary measures recommended by the Ministry of National Education. She modernized the library by obtaining necessary cataloging materials from the National Central Library of Florence and initiating proper inventory, cataloging, and record-keeping processes, establishing the library as a public service.

During World War II, Broli organized the evacuation of the library’s most valuable materials according to the Ministry's Air Raid Protection Plan. She entrusted the most precious works to Father Omero Mugnaini, an anti-fascist parish priest in Istia d'Ombrone, who safeguarded them in the rectory of San Salvatore. This decision preserved the oldest materials through the war. On 29 November 1943, Palazzo Mensini was heavily damaged by the Allied bombing, leaving the library unguarded and subject to looting. Surviving materials were moved to the basement of the Royal Technical Industrial School on Piazza De Maria, outside Porta Vecchia. However, this location was also compromised when the building was damaged, and the basement was completely flooded during a citywide flood of the Ombrone River on 2 November 1944.

=== Luciano Bianciardi and the Post-war period ===
At the end of the war, the Chelliana Library experienced a period of neglect and uncertainty. Palazzo Mensini was rebuilt in 1946 but many of the library’s books were still stored in the flooded basement of the school in Piazza De Maria. In 1945, Broli was assigned to the municipal library of Asti, and the Chelliana was managed by the municipal administration with the help of volunteers. Among these volunteers was Luciano Bianciardi, who began cleaning the books from mud in 1948, initially without pay, and was eventually hired by the library on 24 January 1949. Although the Municipality intended to appoint Tullio Mazzoncini, then a city councilor, as director, the superintendent Anita Mondolfo requested an official call for applications. Of the three applicants, only Bianciardi had a degree and had already begun reorganizing the material unofficially. In the fall of 1951, Luciano Bianciardi was appointed director of the Chelliana.

The library reopened to the public in the summer of 1949, with the official inauguration on 6 July 1952, attended by local authorities, Director General Ettore Apolloni, and Library Inspector General Carlo Frattarolo. At the time of the inauguration, the library had 20,000 volumes. In the post-war cultural fervor, the Chelliana saw a strong organizational and intellectual revival, with Bianciardi promoting numerous initiatives in the city and province. These included organizing a film club, and the Book Week inaugurated in November 1953 with the presence of Minister Amintore Fanfani. Starting in February 1952, Bianciardi organized a series of conferences and meetings at the library, inviting intellectuals such as Carlo Cassola, Giuseppe Dessì, Aldo Capitini, Guido Aristarco, Carlo Salinari, and Carlo Montella. Bianciardi himself gave lectures on topics including the Spoon River Anthology, the statutes of Montepescali, Chelliana's valuable materials, and Benedetto Croce. This period of intense cultural activity, involving conferences, intellectuals, local bureaucrats, and public officials, would be satirized by Bianciardi in his first novel Il lavoro culturale ("Cultural Work", 1957).

One of Bianciardi's most significant contributions to the Chelliana was the creation of the Bibliobus, a mobile library intended to extend services to rural areas of Grosseto. The bibliobus, a modified Lancia Ardea van, was inaugurated on 20 June 1953, in Piazza Socci. It was designed to hold about a thousand small-format volumes. Additionally, branch libraries were opened in Batignano, Istia d'Ombrone, Montepescali, and later in Braccagni and Marina di Grosseto.

In April 1954, after Bianciardi resigned to join the founding of Feltrinelli in Milan, Vladimiro Lenzi, son of mayor Lio Lenzi, became the director, followed by Aladino Vitali in December 1954. In 1955, Aldo Mazzolai was appointed as the director for the civic museum, separating it from the library. By 1955, the Chelliana had 25,579 volumes. From the early 1960s to the early 1980s, the library had around 15,000 visitors, with a city population of about 55,000. The 1966 Ombrone flood caused significant damage, marginalizing the library for about four years. In 1975, a termite infestation further disrupted its activities. Vitali's directorship lasted over thirty years, focusing on conservation, expanding collections, professional development, and reorganization. Vitali also lamented the municipality's neglect and disinterest in the complaints about the lack of qualified staff and the inadequacy of the spaces, shared with the Lyceum. He served until September 1985, followed by Mariagrazia Celuzza, also director of the archaeological museum, from 1986 to 1989.

=== Decentralization and decline ===
In January 1990, Valerio Fusi was appointed director. He aimed to update collections, align with 1988 IFLA standards, and catalog the ancient collection. In 1993, the Lyceum was transferred to another complex outside the city walls, and the whole Palazzo Mensini was designated for the Chelliana. For restoration and renovation, the library was temporarily relocated in a former school in Villaggio Europa. However, this temporary location became permanent due to political changes and delays in Palazzo Mensini's restoration, leading to difficulties and uncertainties for the Chelliana in a limited space in a decentralized area. The library's location remained a political issue for years, with little municipal interest. In 2009, Mayor Emilio Bonifazi considered other locations but eventually resumed work on Palazzo Mensini in December 2014. In 2016, the theft of a 1612 atlas Theatrum Orbis Terrarum by Abraham Ortelius highlighted ongoing issues with providing an adequate library location.

=== Return to Palazzo Mensini ===
In October 2016, the municipal administration led by Antonfrancesco Vivarelli Colonna appointed Anna Bonelli director of the library. The administration confirmed plans to return the Chelliana to Palazzo Mensini. Restoration work, already underway, resumed between 2017 and 2018, focusing on consolidating the ground floor, which would house the library while waiting for the upper floors to be completed. The relocation began on 22 October 2018, and the Chelliana was officially inaugurated at Palazzo Mensini on 27 June 2019, after 25 years.

The restoration of Palazzo Mensini was completed in July 2024, with the library relocated on the building's two upper floors.

== Directors ==
Director	Tenure	
Director	From	To
Giovanni Chelli	1 March 1860	8 December 1869
Giovanni Battista Ponticelli	1874	1904
Giovanni Pizzetti	1907	1909
Alfredo Segrè (librarian)	1909	1920
Giovanni Pizzetti	1921	1923
Antonio Cappelli	1923	28 July 1939
Maria Emilia Broli	1939	1945
Luciano Bianciardi	October 1951	April 1954
Vladimiro Lenzi	April 1954	December 1954
Aladino Vitali	December 1954	September 1985
Mariagrazia Celuzza	September 1985	January 1990
Valerio Fusi	January 1990	2011
Anna Bonelli	October 2016	Incumbent

== Bibliography ==
- Bonelli, Anna (2008). La Biblioteca comunale Chelliana: storia di un progetto (1954-2007). Manziana (VT): Vecchiarelli Editore.
- Bonelli, Anna; Corso, Letizia (January–April 1994). "La biblioteca comunale Chelliana: note per una descrizione storica". Culture del Testo (1).
- Anna Bosco; Luca Seravalle (1998). I manoscritti della biblioteca Chelliana di Grosseto. Catalogo – volume I. Grosseto: Biblioteca Chelliana.
- Bottasso, Enzo (1984). Storia della biblioteca in Italia. Milan: Editrice Bibliografica. pp. 274–275, 329.
- Corrias, Pino (2011). Vita agra di un anarchico. Milan: Feltrinelli.
- Francioni, Elisabetta (2016). Luciano Bianciardi bibliotecario a Grosseto (1949-1954). Rome: Associazione italiana biblioteche.
- Vitali, Aladino (1969). "Il canonico Giovanni Chelli e l'origine risorgimentale della Biblioteca Chelliana di Grosseto". Almanacco dei bibliotecari italiani. Rome: Palombi.
