= Ettore Socci =

Italian politician (1846–1905)

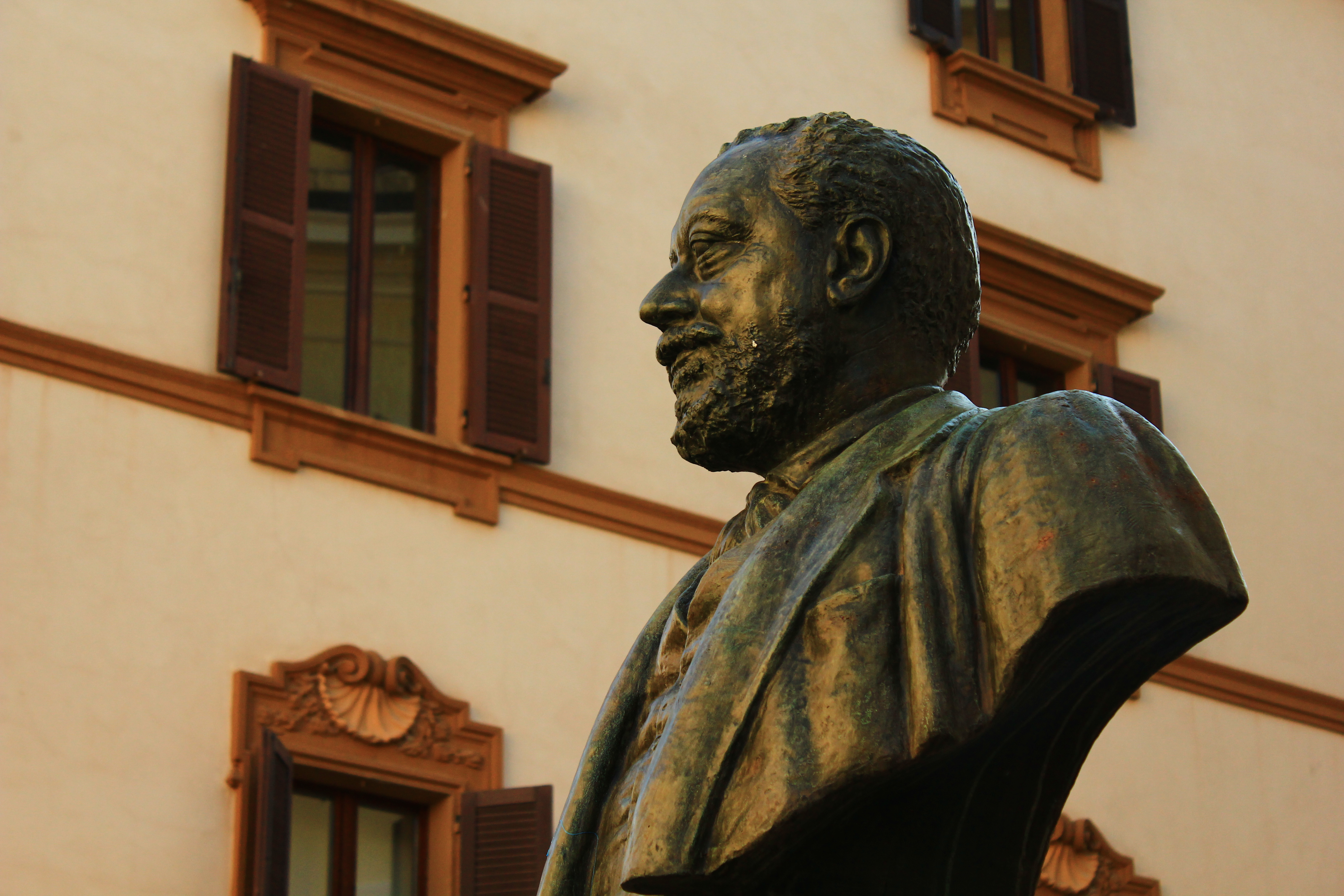
- The bust of Socci in Grosseto

Member of the Chamber of Deputies
- In office 1892–1905

Personal details
- Born: 25 July 1846; Pisa, Grand Duchy of Tuscany
- Died: 18 July 1905 (aged 58); Florence, Kingdom of Italy
- Occupation: Journalist, writer

Ettore Socci (25 July 1846 – 18 July 1905) was an Italian politician and a prominent republican intellectual of the Risorgimento.

== Life and career ==
Born in Pisa and educated in Florence, he fought as a volunteer alongside Giuseppe Garibaldi in the Trentino campaign of 1866, at Mentana (1867), and in the French campaign of 1870-71. A fervent Mazzinian, he directed progressive newspapers such as Satana and Il Grido del Popolo, which were eventually shut down, leading to legal troubles. Socci was frequently arrested but also acquitted, notably in 1874 during a trial involving other radical republicans and internationalists.

He became a Freemason in Rome between 1875 and 1879, joined the Grand Orient of Italy, and co-founded the "Rienzi" Lodge in 1881. Socci continued advocating republican ideals, writing for La Capitale and Lega della Democrazia, as well as founding publications like Il Fascio della Democrazia and La Democrazia. He was also involved with La Tribuna Illustrata.

In politics, Socci joined forces with Felice Cavallotti to organize the 1890 Democratic Congress opposing Prime Minister Francesco Crispi. This effort inspired Antonio Labriola's Proletariato e Radicali. Elected as Grosseto's deputy in 1892, Socci championed key reforms, notably abolishing the seasonal migration of public offices (estatatura) in 1897. He was re-elected for other four subsequent terms and became an honorary citizen of Grosseto.

After his death on 18 July 1905, Grosseto honored him by naming a square after him and erecting a bronze bust in his memory.
