= State Archives of Grosseto =

State archival institution in Grosseto, Italy

- Interactive map of State Archives of Grosseto
- 42.7616°N 11.1128°E
- Location: Piazza Ettore Socci, 3, Grosseto, Italy
- Type: State archives
- Established: 22 February 1958; 68 years ago
- Director: Eloisa Azzaro

Building information
- Building: Palazzo Moschini
- Website: http://www.asgrosseto.beniculturali.it/

The State Archives of Grosseto (Italian: Archivio di Stato di Grosseto) is the state institution responsible, by law, for the preservation of records from the offices of state bodies, as well as public bodies and private producers, in the province of Grosseto.

== History ==
The State Archives of Grosseto was established on 22 February 1958, as a branch of the State Archives of Siena, located in a building on Via Damiano Chiesa, in Grosseto. The initial activities were led by director Vittorio Petroni and focused on reconstructing the documentary heritage, which had been severely damaged by the war and the flood of 1944.

In 1963, by decree of the President of the Republic, it gained legal autonomy.

Starting in 1969 it was temporarily relocated to Via Monterosa, and later found its permanent location in 1980 in the Palazzo Moschini in Piazza Ettore Socci. The building was renovated and inaugurated in May 1983.

== Description ==
The archive holds a historical collection of approximately 50,000 items, spanning from the mid-18th century to the 20th century. Older documents are preserved within specific archival fonds, including twelve parchments from the Civitella Paganico area, dating from 1335 to 1520.

The archive's documentary heritage includes records from the Grand Duchy of Tuscany, starting with the establishment of the Lower Province of Siena in 1766, which made Grosseto a provincial capital. This collection also includes documents from the Napoleonic era. It comprises materials related to the Ufficio dei Fossi e Coltivazioni, the Community Supervisory Chamber, the Maremma Reclamation Office, the Provincial Commissioner, the Civil Engineering Office, the Prefecture.

In addition the institute owns a library containing approximately 9,700 volumes.

== Directors ==
Director	Tenure	
Director	From	To
Vittorio Petroni	1958	1973
Silvana Beltrami Badesso (acting)	1973	1977
Serafina Bueti	1977	2002
Maddalena Corti	2002	2017
Angelo Allegrini (acting)	2017	2022
Eloisa Azzaro	2022	Incumbent

== Sources ==
- "Archivio di Stato di Grosseto". Guida generale degli Archivi di Stato italiani (PDF). Rome: Ministero per i beni culturali e ambientali.
- Direzione generale per gli archivi (2008). Archivio di Stato di Grosseto. Viterbo: BetaGamma.
- Lodolini, Elio (1998). Lineamenti di storia dell'archivistica italiana. Rome: Carocci.
