= Canapone =

Monument in Grosseto, Italy

- Monumento a Leopoldo II di Lorena
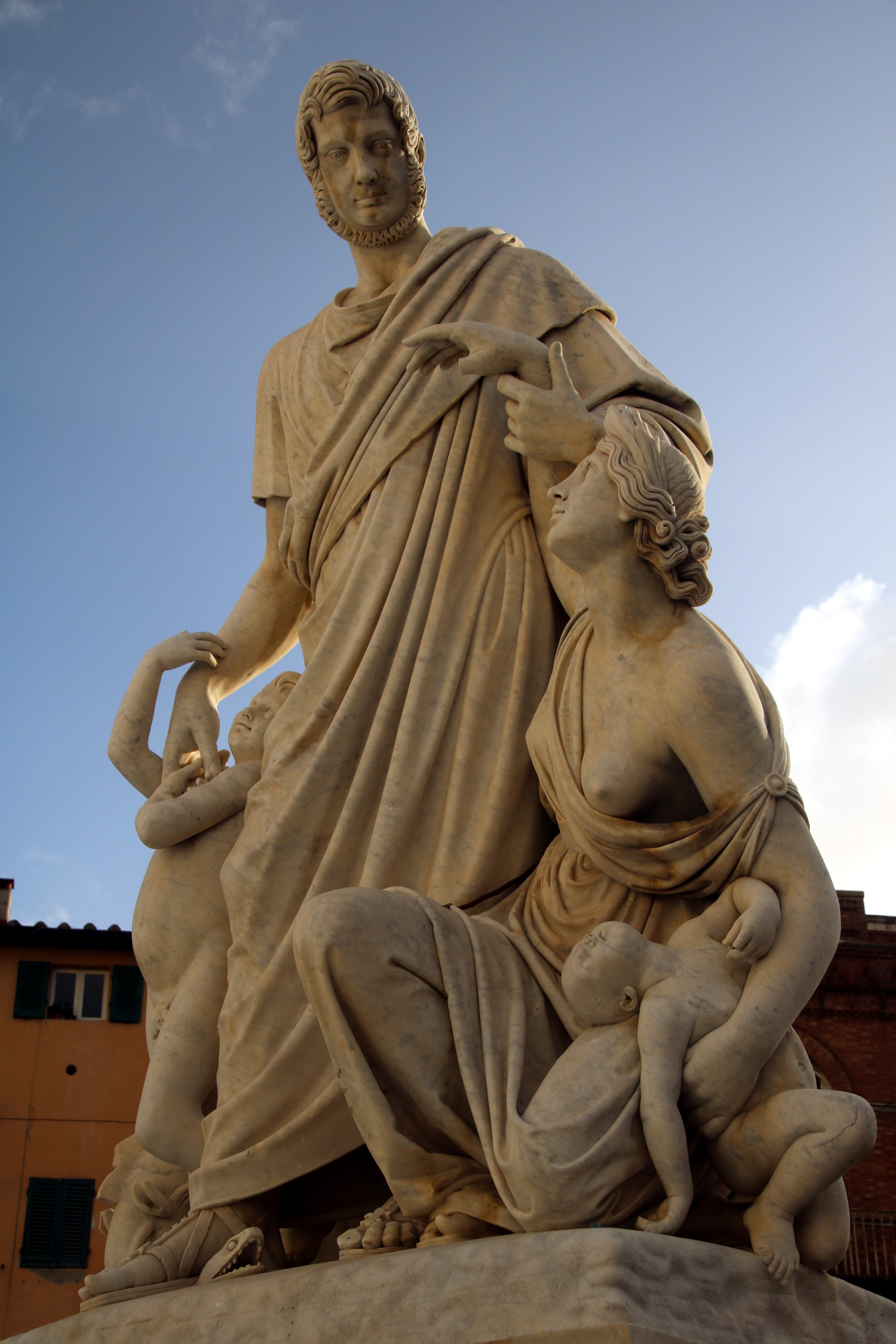
- Interactive map of Canapone
- Location: Piazza Dante, Grosseto; Tuscany, Italy
- Coordinates: 42°45′34.52″N 11°6′49.56″E
- Designer: Luigi Magi
- Material: white marble
- Opening date: 1 May 1846; 180 years ago
- Dedicated to: Leopold II of Tuscany

The monument to Leopold II, Grand Duke of Tuscany, commonly known as Canapone, is a historical landmark in Grosseto, Italy. The statue stands at the center of Piazza Dante, the city's main square.

Leopold II is remembered for initiating significant reforms in the Maremma region, particularly in public health, land reclamation, and infrastructure development, which played a crucial role in transforming the area during the 19th century. The nickname Canapone, affectionately used by the people of Grosseto, is a local reference to the Grand Duke's light-colored hair (canapo meaning "coarse flax").

== History ==
The project was initiated in 1836 by the municipal administration, which appointed an official delegation to oversee the commission. Following a selection process, the commission was awarded to Luigi Magi, a sculptor from Asciano. The final model was completed in 1842. The monument was installed in the center of Piazza delle Catene (now Piazza Dante) in the spring of 1846, as the focal point of a broader urban redevelopment plan led by engineer Angiolo Cianferoni.

As part of the renovation, an artesian well located at the entrance to Via Ricasoli—formerly used to supply water to nearby residences—was decommissioned and buried. Its cast-iron superstructure was later relocated to the town of Arcidosso.

The monument was officially inaugurated on 1 May 1846, by gonfalonier (mayor) Guglielmo Ponticelli, during a ceremony attended by civil, religious, and military authorities. The inaugural address was delivered by Domenico Pizzetti, capitular vicar of the cathedral chapter. Public celebrations continued until May 4, featuring music, horse races, fireworks, hot air balloon ascents, and a public lottery—underscoring the city's collective expression of gratitude for the Grand Duke's role in the "regeneration of the Maremma", particularly his efforts to combat malaria and improve living conditions.

To mark the occasion, canon Giovanni Chelli published a pamphlet titled La Maremma personificata che narra le sue passate e presenti vicende ("The Maremma Personified, Narrating Its Past and Present Events"), dedicated to Leopold II.

== Description ==
The monument consists of a Seravezza-white marble sculptural group set on a high pedestal bearing a dedicatory inscription. It presents an allegory of Leopold II's role in the regeneration of the Maremma, combining symbolic figures to convey both historical suffering and civic rebirth.

At the center stands Leopold II, dressed as an ancient Roman, with a calm and dignified expression. To his left, he supports a seated woman holding a dying child. The woman represents the Maremma, while the child symbolizes the generations lost to malaria. Her upward gaze toward the Grand Duke conveys both sorrow and hope.

In his right hand, Leopold II holds a nude, joyful child representing future generations whose survival was secured by his reforms. This child crushes a snake beneath his feet, symbolizing the eradication of malaria. The snake is also attacked by a griffin, the emblem of Grosseto, symbolizing the joint effort of ruler and community to overcome disease and promote progress.

The pedestal bears the inscription: "To the glory of Leopold II / this monument / as a reminder to future generations / of the gratitude / of a regenerated province / and of his immortal benefaction".

== Sources ==
- Guide d'Italia. Toscana. Milan: Touring Club Italiano. 2012. p. 883.
- Mariagrazia Celuzza; Mauro Papa, eds. (2013). Grosseto visibile. Guida alla città e alla sua arte pubblica. Arcidosso: Effigi. pp. 121–122.
- Parisi, Marcella (2001). Grosseto dentro e fuori porta. L'emozione e il pensiero. Arcidosso: C&P Adver Effigi. p. 26.
- Letizia Franchina, ed. (1995). Tra Ottocento e Novecento. Grosseto e la Maremma alla ricerca di una nuova immagine. Siena: Soprintendenza per i beni ambientali e architettonici per le province di Siena e Grosseto.
- Lucatti, Renato (1994). Luigi Magi scultore di Asciano: l'epoca, l'uomo, le opere. Asciano: Taccuini.
- Mazzini, Vanessa (1996). Immagine e arredo urbano a Grosseto. L'asse della città da Piazza Fratelli Rosselli a Piazza De Maria. Grosseto: I Portici.
