= Palazzo Mensini =

Palace in Grosseto, Italy

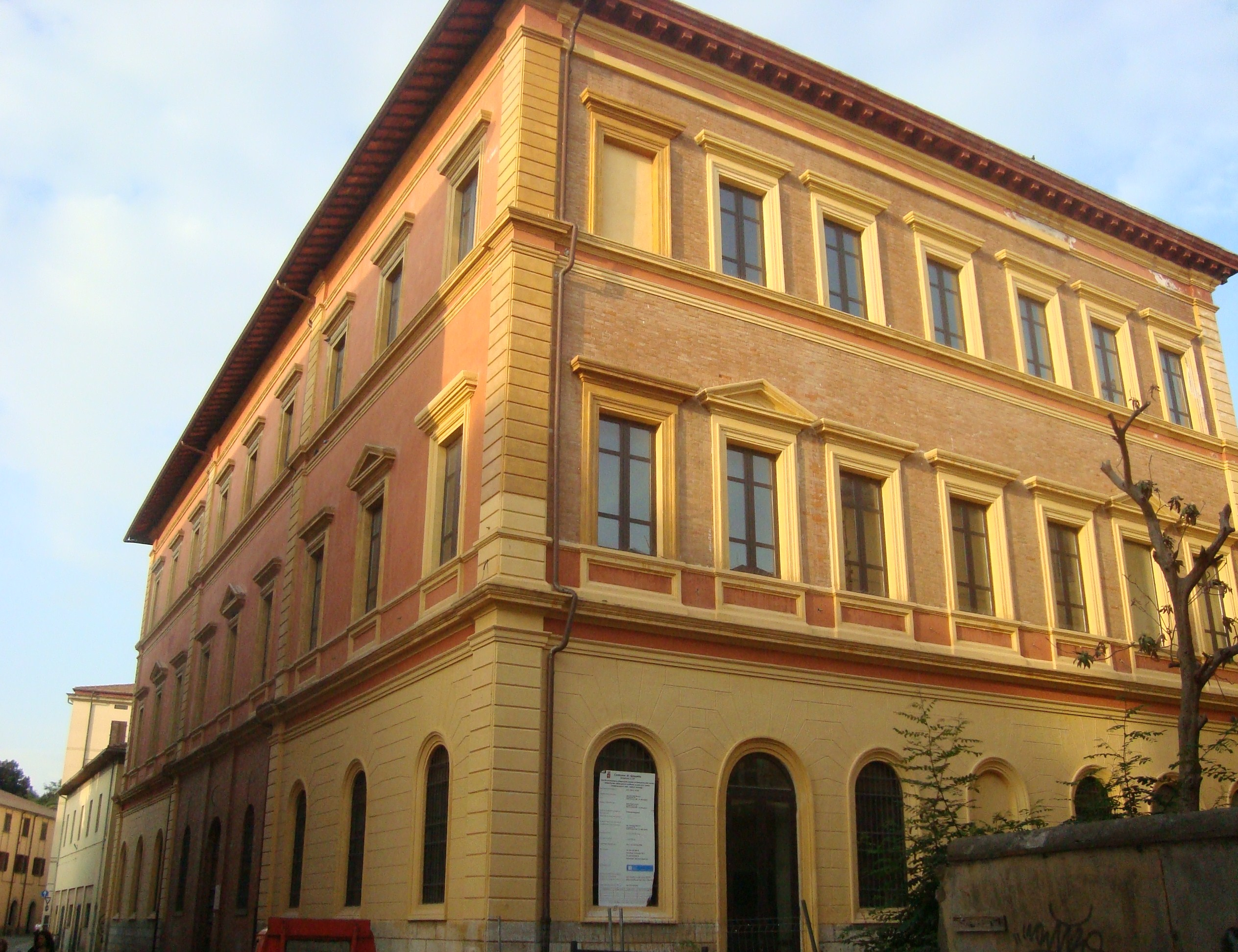
- Interactive map of the Palazzo Mensini area

General information
- Type: Palace
- Location: Via Giuseppe Mazzini 36; Grosseto, Tuscany, Italy
- Coordinates: 42°45′40.6″N 11°06′43.7″E
- Named for: Giovanni Domenico Mensini
- Construction started: 1893
- Completed: 1898
- Inaugurated: 21 April 1898; 127 years ago

Technical details
- Floor count: 3

Design and construction
- Architect: Giuseppe Luciani

Palazzo Mensini is a palace in the historic center of Grosseto, Tuscany.

The building is located along the eastern side of Via Giuseppe Mazzini, in the section that leads from Porta Corsica to Porta Nuova, opposite the Royal Elementary School building. It is named after Bishop Giovanni Domenico Mensini, whose will provided for the construction of the palace as the seat of the diocesan seminary. Palazzo Mensini currently houses the Chelliana Library.

== History ==
The palace was built with a donation of 30,000 scudi from Bishop Giovanni Domenico Mensini, who died in 1858, to house the city's diocesan seminary. Its design began under the initiative of Bishop Bernardino Caldaioli in 1892, with the project delivered by engineer Giuseppe Luciani to the Cathedral chapter in September 1893. The inauguration ceremony took place on 21 April 1898.

During World War I, the building was requisitioned to house the Red Cross.

In 1922, it was purchased by the Municipality of Grosseto and designated as the seat of the "Carducci-Ricasoli" Royal Gymnasium and Lyceum. The following year, the Chelliana Library and the Civic Museum were also housed in Palazzo Mensini. The building was bombed and partially destroyed on 29 November 1943. The library and museum suffered significant damage, exacerbated by the subsequent Ombrone flood on 2 November 1944, and were subjected to looting and pillaging. The building was reconstructed in its original form by the end of 1946 and continued to house the lyceum, library, and museum.

During the flood on 4 November 1966, the ground floor of the palace was completely inundated, causing extensive damage to bibliographic materials and artifacts.

In 1975, the Civic Museum was moved to the former courthouse building in Piazza Baccarini, and in 1993 the Lyceum relocated to the new "Cittadella dello Studente" complex. In 1994, restoration work began to convert the entire palace into the Chelliana Library's headquarters, with the library temporarily relocated to a building in Villaggio Europa. The construction work was soon interrupted, and due to various municipal administration delays, the building remained unused for twenty-five years. Two projects commissioned to architect Roberto Aureli in 2003 and 2008 were never implemented.

Renovation work resumed in December 2014 with the restoration of the roof and continued throughout 2017 with the completion of the ground floor. The library returned to Palazzo Mensini in June 2019. The overall restoration of the building was completed in July 2024.

== Sources ==
- Bonelli, Anna (2008). La Biblioteca comunale Chelliana: storia di un progetto (1954-2007). Manziana (VT): Vecchiarelli Editore.
- Mariagrazia Celuzza; Mauro Papa, eds. (2013). Grosseto visibile. Guida alla città e alla sua arte pubblica. Arcidosso: Edizioni Effigi.
- Innocenti, Mario; Innocenti, Elena (1993). Grosseto:briciole di storia. Cartoline e documenti d'epoca 1899-1944. Grosseto: Innocenti Editore. pp. 211–213.
- Francioni, Elisabetta (2016). Luciano Bianciardi bibliotecario a Grosseto (1949-1954). Rome: Associazione italiana biblioteche.
