= Piazza della Palma =

Public square in Grosseto, Italy

Piazza Randolfo Pacciardi
- Piazza della Palma
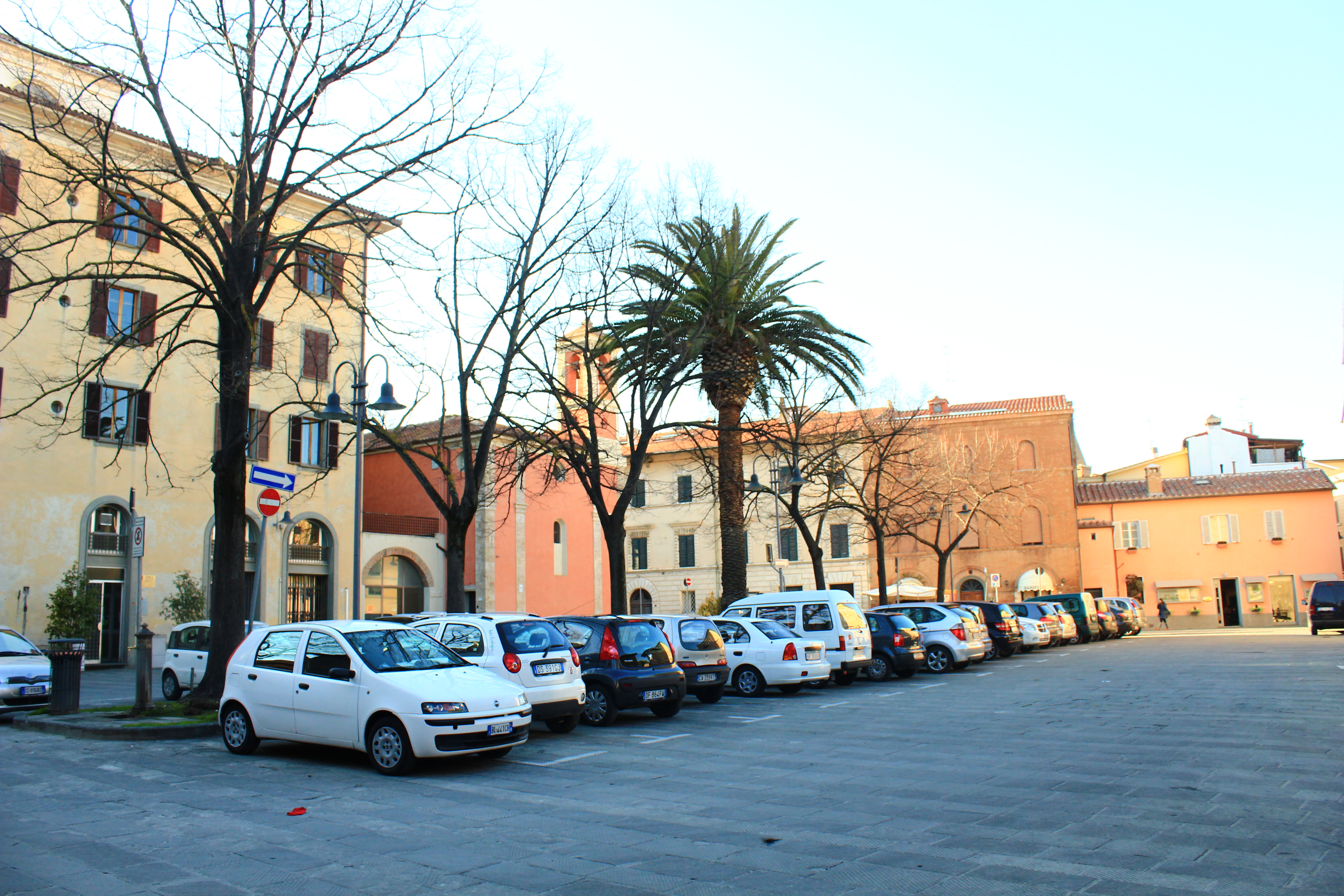

- Location within Tuscany
- Former name: Piazza della Palma
- Namesake: Randolfo Pacciardi
- Location: Grosseto, Tuscany, Italy
- Coordinates: 42°45′39″N 11°06′57″E

Piazza Randolfo Pacciardi, better known as Piazza della Palma (lit. 'Square of the Palm tree'), is a public square in the historic centre of Grosseto, Tuscany, Italy.

Originally named after a palm tree first planted in the 18th century and continuously replanted over time, the square is officially dedicated to Randolfo Pacciardi but remains popularly known as Piazza della Palma.

== History ==
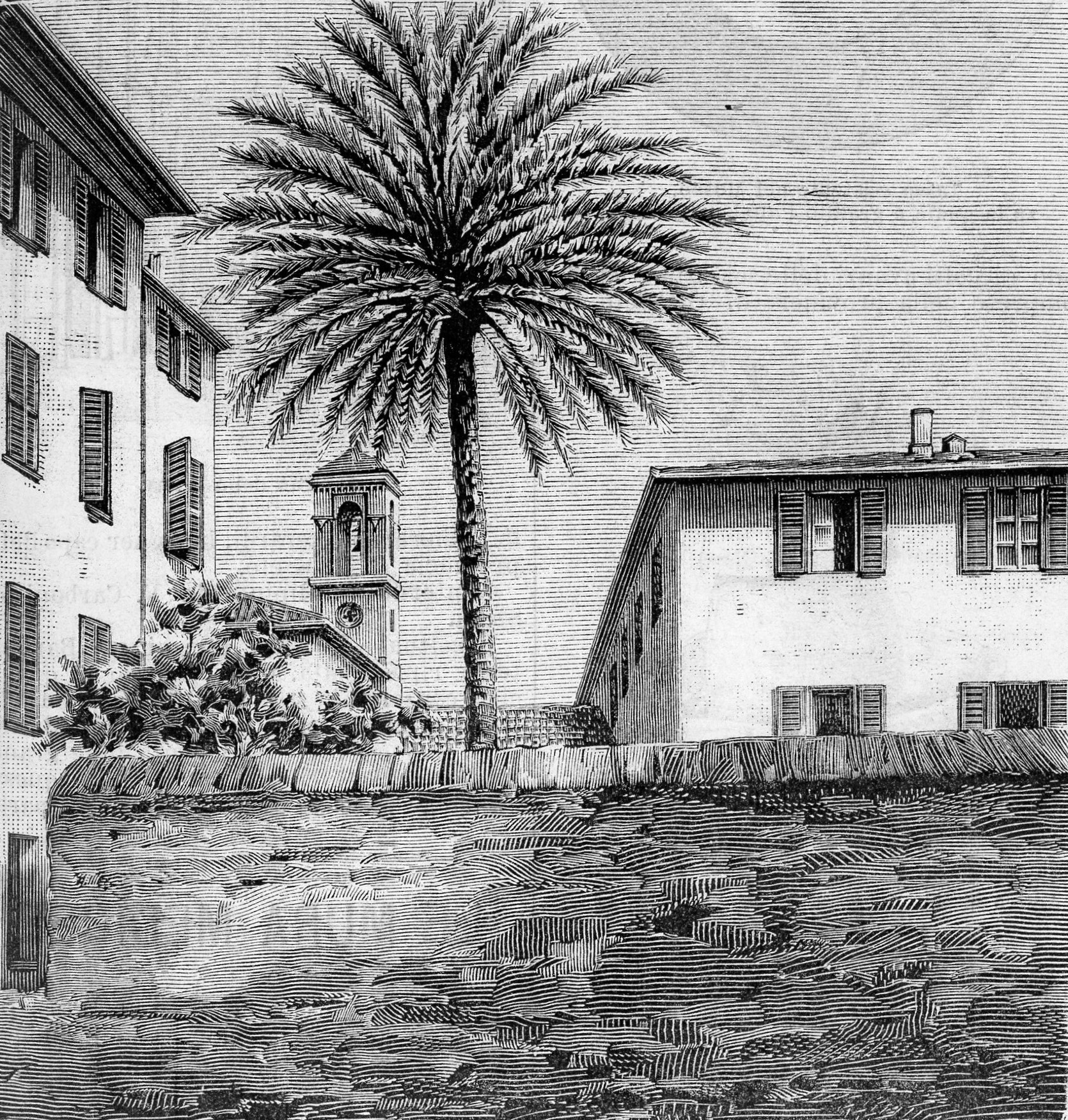
The palm tree depicted in 1896

Archaeological excavations conducted by Riccardo Francovich between 1998 and 2002 revealed that Piazza della Palma was the original nucleus of Grosseto. Evidence of huts and earthen houses indicates a stable settlement in the area. The square's elevation, about 5 meters higher than the rest of the historic center, provided safety from Ombrone River floods. Surrounding streets also showed traces of wooden structures, suggesting that this site functioned as the main hub for nearby smaller settlements.

By the 9th century, while most of the settlement comprised wooden or earthen structures, significant buildings such as churches were already constructed in stone, as evidenced by findings near the churches of San Giorgio and San Pietro. The village in Piazza della Palma's site likely had rudimentary defenses, such as wooden palisades or a ditch, which separated it from the Aldobrandeschi castle located elsewhere in the city. This division persisted into the early 12th century until the two areas were unified within a single city wall.

On the site where the square now stands, there was a city block until 1943, located between the apse of the church of Misericordia and the rear of the prison. This block featured a building that later became the property of Egidio Bruchi, the mayor of Grosseto. In its courtyard stood a palm tree, traditionally said to date back to 1796. The same tree was described in 1867 by American writer William Dean Howells in his Italian Journeys.

"In the very heart of the place there is a lovely palm-tree, rare, if not sole, in that latitude. This palm stands in a well-sheltered, dull little court, out of everything's way, and turns tenderly toward the wall that shields in the north. It has no other company but a beautiful young lady, who leans out of a window high over its head, and I have no doubt talks with it. At the moment we discovered the friends, the maiden was looking pathetically to the northward, while the palm softly stirred and opened its plumes, as a bird does when his song is finished."

— William Dean Howells, Italian Journeys (1867)

On 14 February 1937, a violent storm struck Grosseto, breaking the palm tree due to strong easterly winds. That July, Bruchi planted a new date palm next to the remains of the old 18th-century tree. However, during a World War II bombing raid in 1943, the Palazzo Bruchi was destroyed. It was never rebuilt, and the block's demolition, part of a reconstruction plan by engineer Giovanni Cavallucci, eventually cleared the area for the creation of the square. A new palm tree was planted to commemorate the earlier ones. In 2001, the square was dedicated to politician Randolfo Pacciardi.

== Description ==
The square is rectangular in shape, with its longest axis oriented north-south. The northwestern section is bordered by a few buildings and the apse area and bell tower of the church of Misericordia. On this side, Largo Carlo Gentili opens seamlessly into the adjacent Piazza dei Martiri d'Istia. The entire northern side runs along Via Garibaldi, linking Piazza della Palma with Piazza Mensini. The southeastern side is bordered by Via Corsini, which features the entrance courtyard to the Museum of Natural History of Maremma.

At the center of the square lies a tree-lined area featuring a California palm, surrounded by a parking lot.

== Sources ==
- Mariagrazia Celuzza; Mauro Papa, eds. (2013). Grosseto visibile. Guida alla città e alla sua arte pubblica. Arcidosso: Edizioni Effigi.
- Maddalena Corti, ed. (1995). Grosseto post-unitaria. Grosseto: Archivio di Stato di Grosseto.
- Roberto Farinelli; Riccardo Francovich (2000). Guida alla Maremma medievale. Itinerari di archeologia nella provincia di Grosseto. Siena: Nuova Immagine.
- Innocenti, Mario; Innocenti, Elena (2005). Grosseto: briciole di storia. Cartoline e documenti d'epoca 1899-1944. Grosseto: Innocenti Editore.
- Innocenti, Mario; Innocenti, Stefano (2003). Grosseto: briciole di storia. Cronaca fotografica della città e della periferia (Ponte Tura, ippodromo del Casalone, il Deposito etc.) dalla seconda metà del XVIII secolo agli anni sessanta del Novecento. Grosseto: Innocenti Editore.
