= Music of Tuscany =

Beyond Florence, there are nine other provinces in the region of Tuscany, named for the largest city in, and capital of, the respective province. Taken together, they offer an intense musical life.

== Musical venues and activities ==
By province:

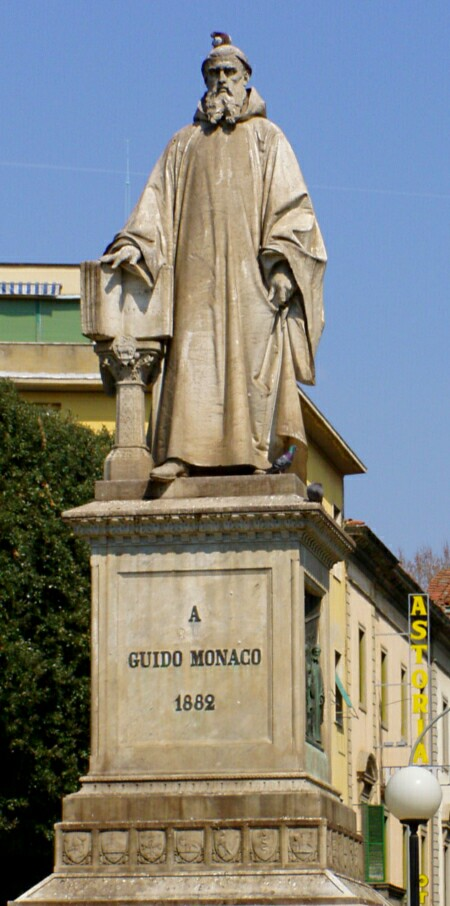
Statue of Guido in Arezzo

- Arezzo: the city is indelibly connected with the name of Guido d'Arezzo, the 11th-century monk who invented modern musical notation and the do-re-mi system of naming notes of the scale. The modern city of Arezzo has two prominent theaters: the Teatro Petrarca, built in 1833 and today the host theater for the Concerts of Arretium series of both classical and jazz music, and the Teatro dei Ricomposti, from 1790. The town of Bibbiena has the Teatro Dovizi, which hosts and annual opera festival entitled Operaperta (Open Opera).
- Grosseto: the province hosts, annually, the Santa Fiora in Musica festival. The Musica nel Chiostro Batignano Opera Festival ran here from 1974 to 2004. Grosseto is the area that lays claim to the origins of the famous May harvest rituals that are speculated to be at the origins of staged drama that later developed into opera (see Music of Italy). The city has two theaters: the Teatro degli Industri and the Teatro Moderno.
- Livorno: the city has the Pietro Mascagni Musical Institute, named for its "favorite son" and composer of Cavalleria Rusticana, one of the landmarks of Italian musical Realism. The province incorporates the island of Elba, site of the short-lived first exile of Napoleon and today a venue for music on the premises of the Teatro dell'Accademia, built at the behest of the emperor, himself. The city also hosts a museum dedicated to the life and work of Mascagni.
- Lucca: the province is the birthplace of the greatest exponent of Italian lyric Romanticism, Giacomo Puccini. Luca is awash in music and memorabilia that recall the composer, including the annual Puccini Festival. His home at Torre del Lago is a museum, shrine, and magnet for musical pilgrims from around the world. The city of Lucca has the Teatro dei Gigli and—as if one favorite son (Puccini) were not enough—the Luigi Boccherini Musical Institute.
- Massa-Carrara: the town of Massa has the Teatro Guglielmi and nearby Massa—as the name might indicate—has a theater, the Teatro degli Animosi, built in 1840 with the enormous amounts of money made from the world-famous Carrara marble quarries. The facade of the theater, obviously, is all Carrara marble.
- Pisa: the city of Pisa hosts the Teatro Verdi, home of the impressive Vincenzo Galileo Choir, named for the great musician of the Florentine Camerata and, incidentally, father of the astronomer Galileo. In the town of Volterra, there is the Teatro Persio Flacco, site of the annual Volterrana Musical Spring series of classical music concerts.
- Pistoia: the site, in the town of Montecatini Terme, of the Imperial Theater. The town has been short-and long-term home to a number of composers: Rossini, Richard Strauss, Toscanini, Enrico Caruso and Giuseppe Verdi. The Art Academy Museum is a repository of memorabilia of these composers.
- Prato: the city is historically one of the important centers for organ construction in Italy. There are two prominent theatres in Prato: the Teatro Metastasio and the Politeama Pratese, home of the recently founded Camerata Strumentale Città di Prato, a youth orchestra.
- Siena: the city is well known for the Accademia Musicale Chigiana, an organization that currently sponsors major musical activities such as the Siena Music Week and the Alfredo Casella International Composition Competition. Prominent theaters include the Teatro dei Rinnovati and the Teatro dei Rozzi. There is also the annual Siena Jazz Festival.
