= Piazza Ettore Socci =

Public square in Grosseto, Italy

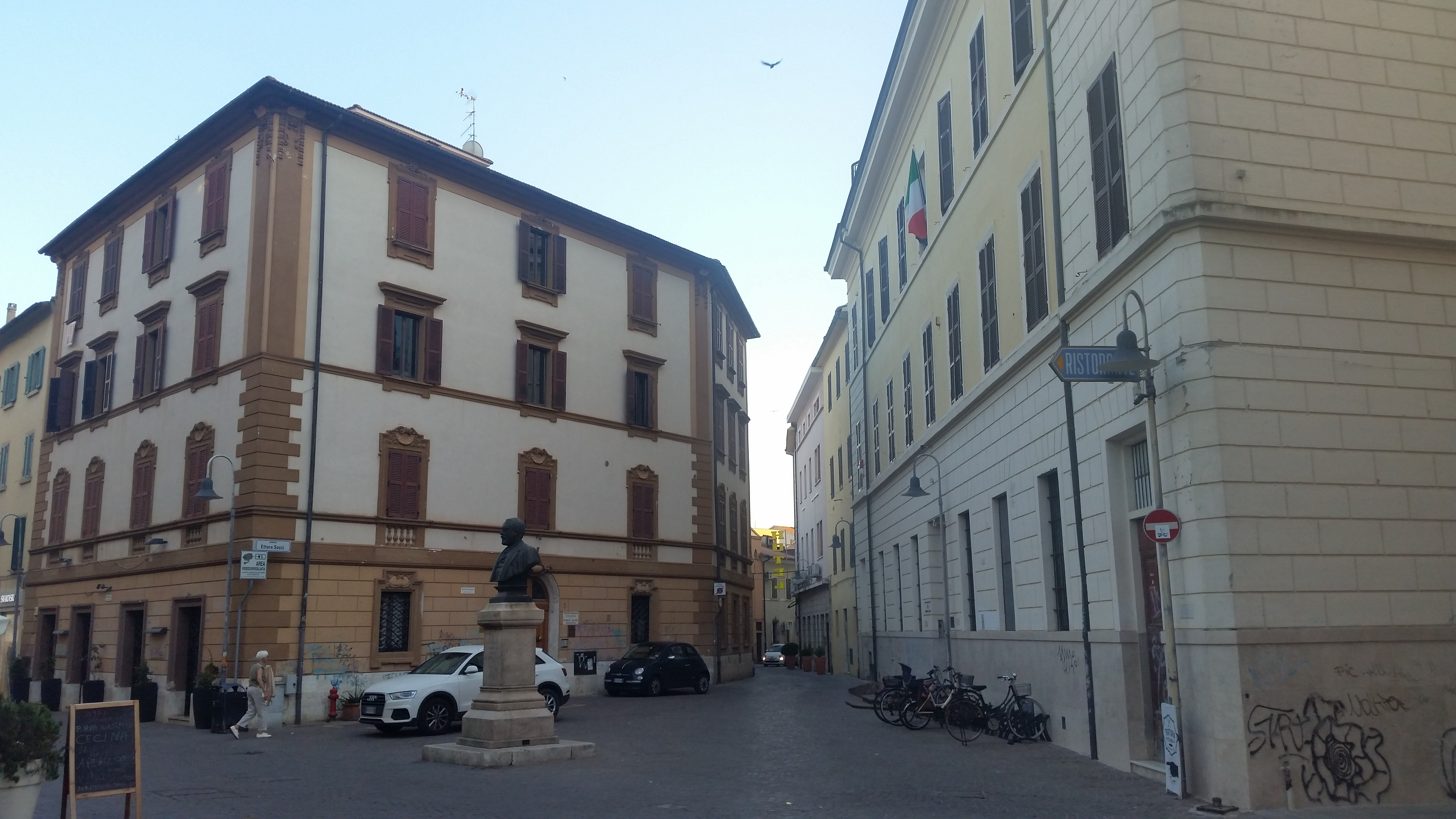

- Location within Tuscany
- Former names: Piazza del Pozzo di San Pietro, Piazza Solferino
- Namesake: Ettore Socci
- Location: Grosseto, Tuscany, Italy
- Coordinates: 42°45′42″N 11°06′47″E

Construction
- Completion: 1890

Piazza Ettore Socci is a public square in the historic centre of Grosseto, Tuscany, Italy. It opens along the western side of Corso Carducci. From Piazza Socci, the narrow Via Paolucci de' Calboli extends southwest, connecting it to Via Mazzini, the inner ring road of the historic centre.

The square is characterized by a monument featuring a bust of Ettore Socci, a politician who represented Grosseto in the Chamber of Deputies of the Kingdom of Italy. Notable buildings include the Palazzo Moschini (now the State Archives of Grosseto), and the former Bank of Italy building.

== History ==
The square was built between 1880 and 1890, designed by engineer Giuseppe Luciani, on land previously belonging to the ancient church of San Pietro. For this reason, it was initially known as Piazza del Pozzo di San Pietro ("Square of the Well of St. Peter") before being renamed Piazza Solferino.

Its current name, commemorating Ettore Socci, was adopted in late 1907, following the installation of a monument with a bust depicting the politician. The square housed the central Post Office from 1885 to 1930 and the Bank of Italy from 1886 to 1975.

== Monuments and buildings ==
=== Monument to Ettore Socci ===
The monument to Ettore Socci stands at the center of the square and features a bronze bust set on a white marble pedestal. Originally designed by sculptor Emilio Gallori and inaugurated on 24 November 1907, it commemorates the republican politician who was elected multiple times to the Chamber of Deputies representing Grosseto's constituency. Socci fought for the abolition of estatatura, a seasonal migration phenomenon where public offices in the city were moved inland during summer to escape the threat of malaria. In the early 1940s, the bust was melted down for wartime armament production and was recreated in 1947 by Tolomeo Faccendi.

=== Palazzo Moschini ===
Palazzo Moschini has undergone several significant renovations over its history, including one in the early 19th century by the Pozzi brothers and another in 1885 when it began hosting the central Post Office. The building was designed by Gherardo Gherardi, the chief engineer of the Province of Grosseto, with interiors decorated by Carboni of Siena. In 1908, it was elevated by an additional floor. After the Post Office was relocated to the modern building designed by Angiolo Mazzoni in 1932, it became the headquarters of the Treasury Office (Intendenza di Finanza). Since 1983, it has served as the home of the State Archives of Grosseto.

=== Former Bank of Italy Building ===
The former Bank of Italy building was constructed in 1896 by modifying a pre-existing structure that had served as the "Stella d'Italia" hotel operated by Oreste Civinini until 1890. Concurrently with the redevelopment of Corso Carducci and the creation of the square, the building was rebuilt to host the provincial branch of the Bank of Italy. In the 1970s, the bank was relocated outside the city walls.

== Sources ==
- Mariagrazia Celuzza; Mauro Papa, eds. (2013). Grosseto visibile. Guida alla città e alla sua arte pubblica. Arcidosso: Edizioni Effigi.
- Maddalena Corti, ed. (1995). Grosseto post-unitaria. Grosseto: Archivio di Stato di Grosseto.
- Enrico Crispolti; Anna Mazzanti; Luca Quattrocchi, eds. (2006). Arte in Maremma nella prima metà del Novecento. Milano: Silvana Editoriale.
- Fiorenza Gemini, ed. (2008). Archivio di Stato di Grosseto. Viterbo: BetaGamma Editrice.
- Innocenti, Mario; Innocenti, Elena (2005). Grosseto: briciole di storia. Cartoline e documenti d'epoca 1899-1944. Grosseto: Innocenti Editore.
- Innocenti, Mario; Innocenti, Stefano (2003). Grosseto: briciole di storia. Cronaca fotografica della città e della periferia (Ponte Tura, ippodromo del Casalone, il Deposito etc.) dalla seconda metà del XVIII secolo agli anni sessanta del Novecento. Grosseto: Innocenti Editore.
