= Antonio Ghini =

- Died: before 1478; Siena, Republic of Siena
- Occupation: Sculptor

Antonio Ghini (died before 1478) was an Italian sculptor active in the Republic of Siena during the 15th century.

== Life and career ==
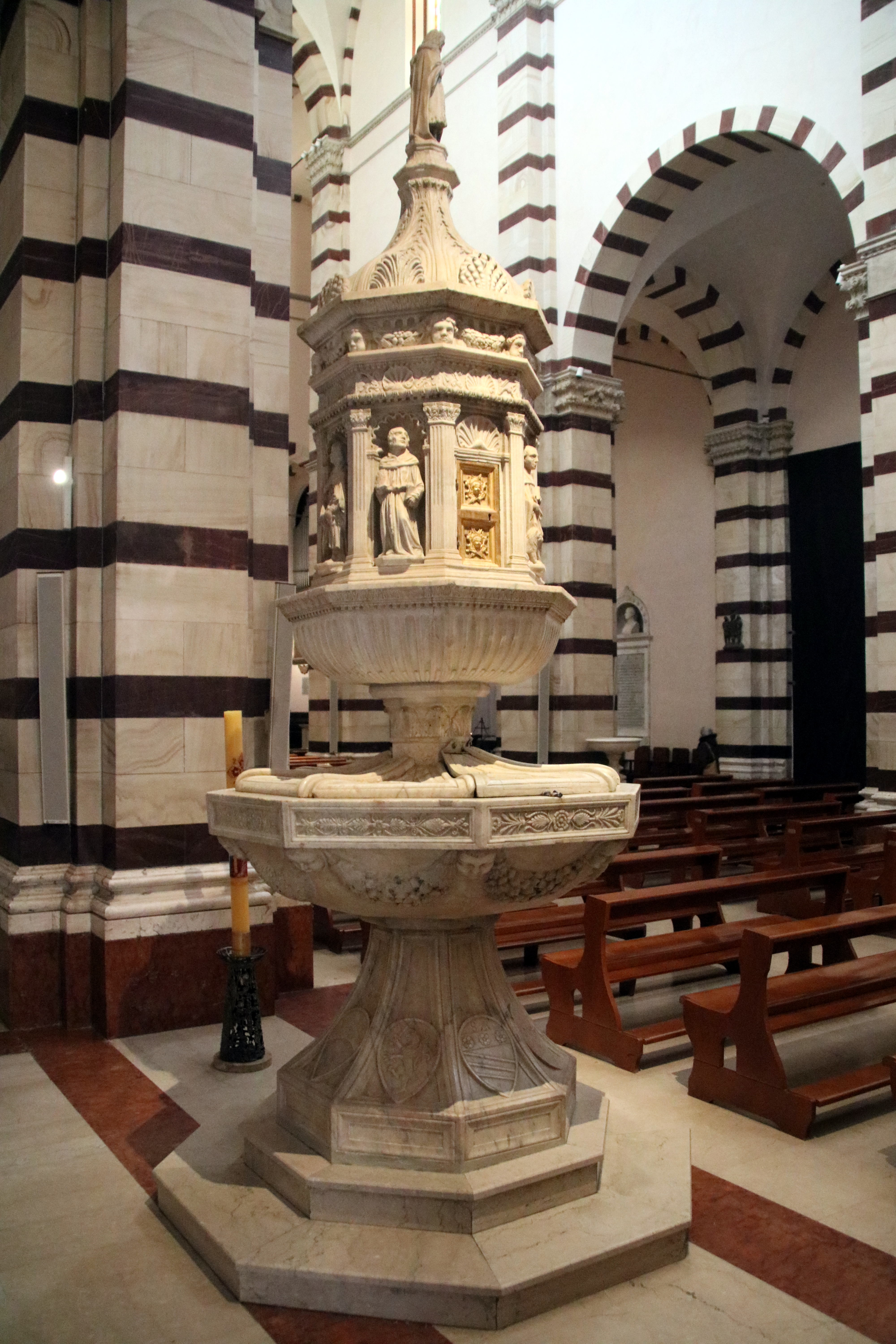
Baptismal font (c. 1475) in Grosseto Cathedral.

The son of Paolo Ghini, he was probably of Lucchese origin. Documents of the Opera del Duomo in Siena record him as a garzone (assistant) in 1454 and as a master in 1463.

He executed in 1465 the bas-reliefs of the fountain in the main square of Asciano. His works show stylistic affinities with Antonio Federighi and Giovanni di Stefano, the latter of whom he closely collaborated with between 1470 and 1475.

In Grosseto, he produced the reliefs for the altar of the Madonna delle Grazie, built to house a panel painting by Matteo di Giovanni, as well as the baptismal font in Grosseto Cathedral. Between 1475 and 1477 he carved the relief of the Judgment of Solomon for Lucca Cathedral.

He died in Siena shortly before 1478; in that year his wife Lorenza is recorded in documents as a widow.

== Sources ==
- Baracchini, Clara; Caleca, Antonino (1973). Il duomo di Lucca. Lucca: Baroni.
- Carli, Enzo (1980). Gli scultori senesi. Milan: Electa.
- Coltellacci, Stefano (2000). "GHINI, Antonio". Dizionario Biografico degli Italiani. Vol. 53. Rome: Treccani.
- Corti, G. (1986). "Una compagnia di dittatori a Siena nella metà del Cinquecento". Paragone. XXXVII (489).
- Fumi Cambi Gado, Francesca (1996). "Opere d'arte del secolo XV nella cattedrale di Grosseto". In Gnoni Maravelli, Cristina; Martini, Laura (eds.). La cattedrale di San Lorenzo a Grosseto. Arte e storia dal XIII al XIX secolo. Milan: Silvana Editoriale.
- Porciatti, Lorenzo (1903). "Il fonte battesimale della cattedrale di Grosseto". Arte e storia. XXII (6).
