= Chiesa dei Bigi =

Former church in Tuscany, Italy

Church of Bigi
- Church of St. Clare
- Chiesa dei Bigi (Italian); Chiesa di Santa Chiara (Italian)
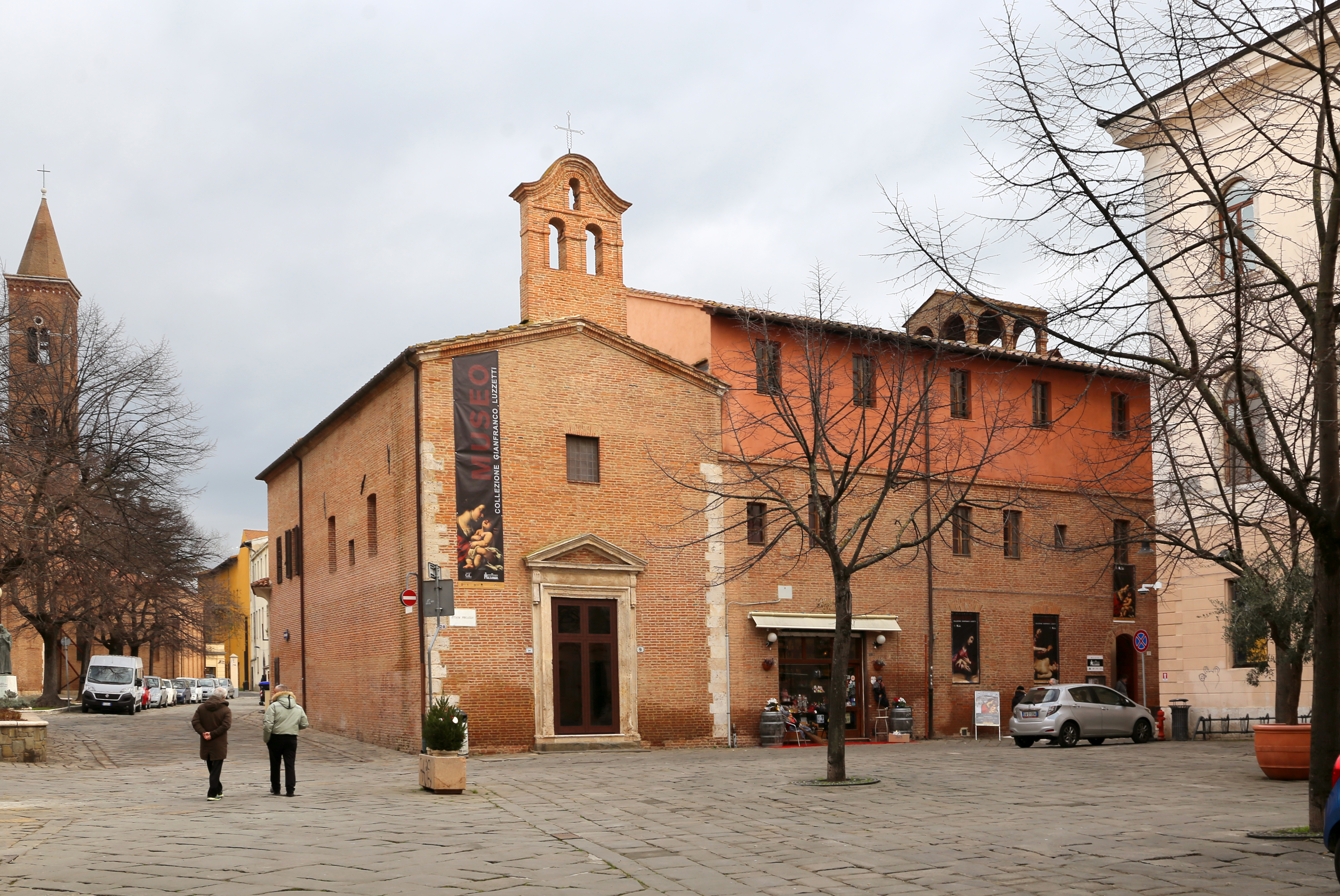
- Chiesa dei Bigi or Santa Chiara
- Church of Bigi
- 42°45′42.2″N 11°06′50″E
- Location: Grosseto, Tuscany
- Address: Via Vinzaglio
- Country: Italy
- Denomination: Roman Catholic

History
- Status: Art museum
- Consecrated: 1634

Architecture
- Architectural type: Oratory

Administration
- Diocese: Diocese of Grosseto

The Chiesa dei Bigi (lit. 'Church of the ash-greys'), once known as Santa Chiara, is a late Renaissance-Baroque-style, deconsecrated Roman Catholic church in the city of Grosseto, in Tuscany, Italy.

The small church is attached to a former Clarissan order-convent in the center of the town.

== History ==
It was consecrated in 1634 and was originally an oratory dedicated to St. Clare of Assisi, then assigned to the Company of the Saints Ludovico and Gherardo – called Bigi ("ash grey") after the colour of their clothes – in 1796. The brick facade has a bell in the center of the tympanum.

It was abandoned in the early-20th century and restored by the Diocese of Grosseto in 1977. Along with the former convent, the church was then used for cultural activities by the Comune di Grosseto. In 2019, both buildings were restructured in order to house the Museo Collezione Gianfranco Luzzetti.

== Description ==
The church of the Bigi stands to the left of the former Poor Clares convent complex and is identifiable by its bell gable rising from the center of the gabled roof above the brick façade. The main portal is surmounted by a triangular pediment inspired by Renaissance architectural forms, although the overall appearance of the church is predominantly Baroque.

A small square window is positioned at the center of the façade. Along both sides of the façade are irregular travertine blocks placed one above another; these terminate in the upper section, where the facing returns to exposed brickwork.

The interior consists of a single nave and contains three 17th-century Baroque altars. The high altar is decorated with stucco work attributed to the Luganese artist Domenico Notari, who was active in Siena between 1669 and 1700 and is believed to have come to Grosseto at the invitation of Bishop Cesare Ugolini.

== See also ==
- Catholic Church in Italy

== Sources ==
- Mariagrazia Celuzza; Mauro Papa, eds. (2013), Grosseto visibile. Guida alla città e alla sua arte pubblica, Arcidosso: Edizioni Effigi
