= Fabio Cioni =

Italian notary and Protestant dissenter

Fabio Cioni (c. 1520 – unknown) was an Italian notary from Grosseto who became involved in Protestant reformist circles in mid-16th-century Tuscany. He was later investigated by the Roman Inquisition for heresy and condemned to life imprisonment on the galleys of the Grand Duchy of Tuscany after his conviction in 1569.

== Early life and education ==
Cioni was born in Grosseto into a modest family of merchants described in contemporary sources as persone honorate. He studied notarial law in Siena at the university-associated school of notaries. After completing his studies, he returned to Grosseto, where he worked for a time as an elementary schoolteacher before qualifying as a public notary.

Surviving records from the State Archives of Siena document his activity as a notary between 1562 and 1568.

== Religious beliefs and reformist activity ==
Around 1544, Cioni entered the intellectual circle of the Sienese physician Achille Benvoglienti. Within this group he encountered reformist ideas associated with Protestant theology, including doctrines derived from Calvinist and earlier Italian evangelical reform currents. The group discussed works such as John Calvin's Institutes of the Christian Religion and held heterodox views on justification by faith, the Eucharist, purgatory, and the cult of saints. Cioni became increasingly committed to Reformation theology and reportedly rejected several aspects of Catholic practice, including the veneration of images and the doctrine of transubstantiation. He also attempted to educate his children according to Protestant principles and is described as having privately retained Erasmus' writings and a copy of the New Testament.

Following the dispersal of the group during the conflict between Siena and Florence (1552), Cioni adopted a more cautious outward conformity to Catholic practice while maintaining private adherence to reformist beliefs, a posture later described as nicodemite.

== Inquisition and trial ==
Cioni was denounced to the Inquisition in September 1568, in a case overseen by the inquisitor Pietro Fusi from Saronno. The accusation, brought by Fabio from Pienza, included alleged sacrilegious acts against an image of the Virgin Mary, violations of fasting rules (such as eating meat on prohibited days), and rejection of Catholic liturgy. Additional testimony, including a report by the penitentiary prosecutor Camillo Fanucci, linked him to recent support for anti-purgatory preaching.

He was arrested and held in the inquisitorial prison, where he was interrogated repeatedly from September to December 1568. Throughout most of the proceedings he refused to name associates or disclose his beliefs, but under torture on 9 December he eventually confessed his doctrinal positions and revealed members of the reformist circle. His denunciation of collaborators, including Benvoglienti, also had wider political repercussions involving correspondence between Papal States and Medici authorities.

== Conviction ==
Cioni was condemned to life imprisonment on the galleys of the Grand Duchy of Tuscany. On 27 February 1569 he performed a public abjuration in Siena. The date and place of his death are unknown.

== Sources ==
- Storia d'Europa: L'età moderna, secoli XVI–XVIII. Turin: Einaudi. 1995. p. 256.
- Cantimori, Delio (1939). Eretici italiani del Cinquecento. Ricerche storiche. Florence.
- Lavenia, Vincenzo (2010). "L'arca e gli astri. Esoterismo e miscredenza davanti all'Inquisizione (1587–91)". In Cazzaniga, Gian Mario (ed.). Storia d'Italia. Annali 25. L'esoterismo. Turin: Einaudi. pp. 289–321.
- Marchetti, Valerio (1972). "L'archivio dell'Inquisizione senese (Rendiconto di una ricerca in corso)". Bollettino della Società di Studi Valdesi. 93: 81.
- Marchetti, Valerio (1975). Gruppi ereticali senesi del Cinquecento. Florence: La Nuova Italia. pp. 74–83.
- Marchetti, Valerio (1981). "Fabio Cioni". Dizionario Biografico degli Italiani. Vol. 25. Rome: Istituto della Enciclopedia Italiana.
- Piccolomini, P. (1910). "Documenti fiorentini sull'eresia in Siena durante il secolo XVI (1559–1570)". Bullettino Senese di Storia Patria. 17 (2): 170–188.
