= Teatro degli Industri =

Theatre in Grosseto, Italy

Coordinates: 45°30′51.43″N 9°12′50.13″E

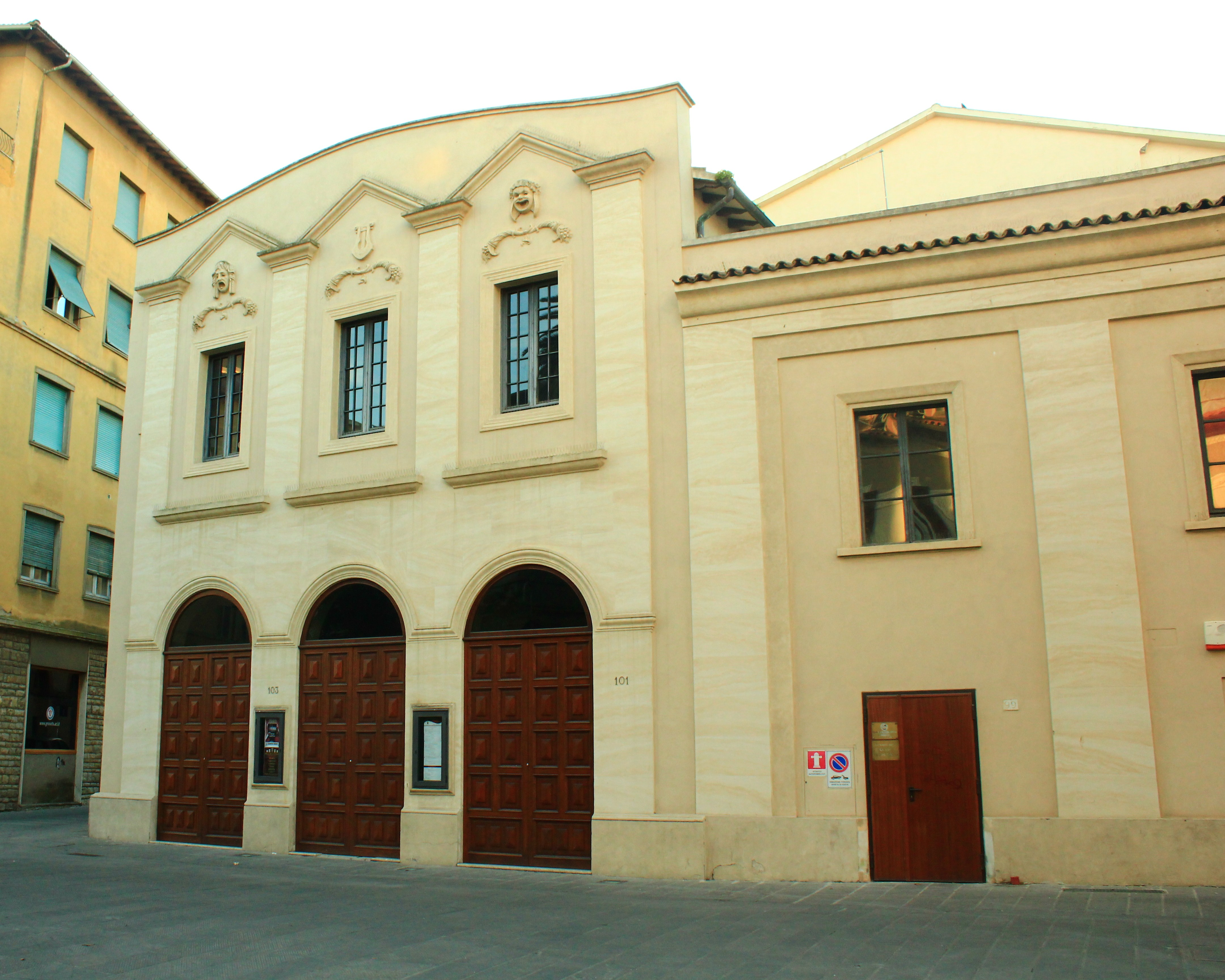
- Interactive map of the Teatro degli Industri area

General information
- Type: Theatre
- Architectural style: Eclectic
- Location: Grosseto, Italy, Via Giuseppe Mazzini
- Construction started: 1819
- Completed: 1892
- Opened: 3 January 1819; 207 years ago

Design and construction
- Architect: Augusto Corbi
- Structural engineer: Ferdinando Ponticelli

Other information
- Seating capacity: 350

The Teatro degli Industri is a theatre and opera house in Grosseto, Italy. It is the historic theatre of the city and one of the two municipal theatres together with the Teatro Moderno.

== History ==
An early theatre was opened in 1819 by the Accademia degli Industri and designed by engineer Giacomo Passerini. The building was entirely re-constructed between 1888 and 1892 by architect Augusto Corbi and engineer Ferdinando Ponticelli. The theatre was purchased by the Bernieri company in 1928 and then sold to the Municipality of Grosseto in 1938.

Turned into a cinema at the end of World War II, it was damaged by the 1966 Ombrone flood and later restored by architect Giuliano Bernardini. Another significant restoration work was carried out in 1990 and the theatre re-opened in 1997.

== Sources ==
- Mariagrazia Celuzza; Mauro Papa, eds. (2013). Grosseto visibile. Guida alla città e alla sua arte pubblica. Arcidosso: Edizioni Effigi.
- Innocenti, Mario; Innocenti, Elena (1993). Grosseto:briciole di storia. Cartoline e documenti d'epoca 1899-1944. Grosseto: Innocenti Editore.
- Santi, Bruno (2007). Guida storico-artistica alla Maremma. Itinerari culturali nella provincia di Grosseto. Siena: Nuova Immagine.

== See also ==
- List of opera houses
- Music of Tuscany
