= Giovanni de Papa =

Italian nobleman and civic official (13th century)

Giovanni de Papa (fl. 1205–1233) was an Italian nobleman and civic official of the Roman Papareschi family who held the office of podestà in several communes of central Italy during the early 13th century.

== Life and career ==
Giovanni di Guido de Papa belonged to the Roman aristocratic Papareschi family, which rose to prominence following the election of Pope Innocent II in 1130. By the 12th and 13th centuries, the family was among the leading noble lineages of Rome.

He held the title of Romanorum consul and was praised by the rhetorician Boncompagno da Signa as a wise and skilled public speaker.

From the beginning of the 13th century, Giovanni served as podestà in a number of communes across central Italy. He was podestà of Perugia in 1205, Viterbo in 1207 and 1212, Todi in 1208 and 1213, and Florence in 1209. He served as podestà of Grosseto in 1216 and of Faenza in 1221. He may also have held the office again in Florence in 1226 and in Orte in 1233.

His son Guido served as podestà of Assisi in 1228.
