= Grosseto Prison =

Prison in Tuscany, Italy

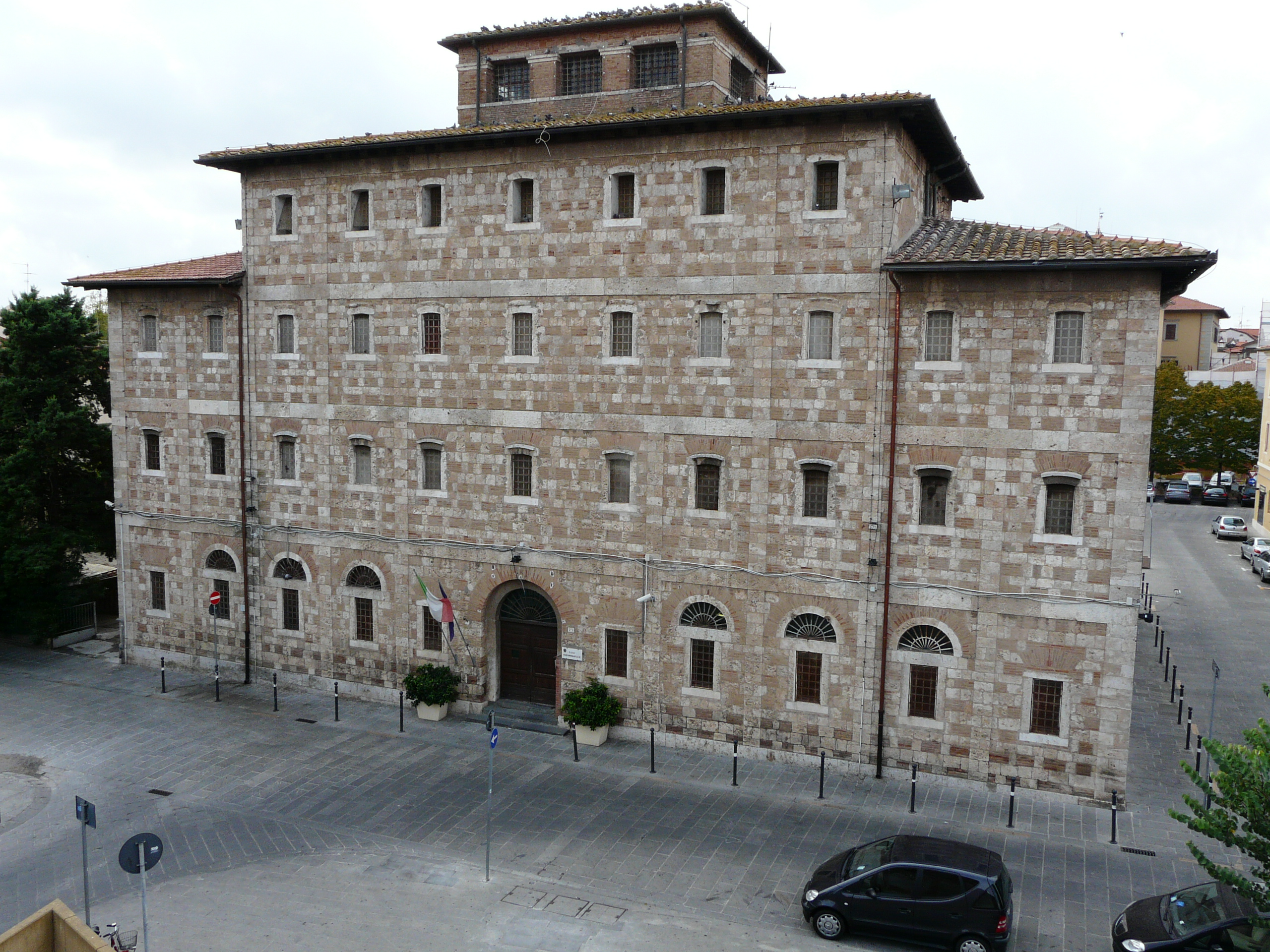
- Interactive map of Grosseto Prison
- Location: Via Aurelio Saffi 23 Grosseto, Tuscany, Italy; 42.760898°N 11.116555°E
- Status: Operational
- Population: 31 (19 April 2026)
- Opened: 1856; 170 years ago
- Managed by: Ministry of Justice
- Warden: Maria Teresa Iuliano
- Website: Official website

The Grosseto Prison is a correctional facility located in the historic center of Grosseto, Tuscany.

The prison was built in the mid-19th century, during the last years of the Grand Duchy of Tuscany. The facility regularly houses male inmates under medium-security conditions, serving sentences of less than five years.

== History ==
The construction of the city jail was decided by a resolution of the Municipal Council on 9 August 1852, and approved by Grand Duke Leopold II of Tuscany on 10 September of the same year, with an allocation of 93,553 lire. It was designed by engineer Giovanni Biagini. The prison, built near the Medicean citadel, became operational starting in 1856.

Initially, the structure's property was fractioned and owned by the province's municipalities, which later came together in a Consortium managed by the mayor of Grosseto. The Kingdom of Italy started renting the building in 1881, and eventually purchased it in 1921 for 548,000 lire.

In 1952, the prison's capacity was ninety male inmates and eight female inmates. That year, the entire structure was regulated and modernized. Next to the building, at the corner between Via Saffi and Via dell'Unione, where some stables destroyed by bombings once stood, the director's residence was built.

The prison has faced heavy criticism for no longer complying with regulatory standards. Its aging infrastructure and overcrowding have prompted discussions about relocating it to a more modern facility. On 28 May 2020, an agreement was signed by the Ministry of Defense, the Ministry of Justice, and the Property Agency to transfer the prison to a new penitentiary to be built outside the historic center.

== Bibliography ==
- Letizia Franchina, ed. (1995). Tra Ottocento e Novecento. Grosseto e la Maremma alla ricerca di una nuova immagine. Soprintendenza per i beni ambientali e architettonici per le province di Siena e Grosseto.
- Innocenti, Mario; Innocenti, Elena (1993). Grosseto:briciole di storia. Cartoline e documenti d'epoca 1899-1944. Grosseto: Innocenti Editore.
- Mariagrazia Celuzza; Mauro Papa, eds. (2013). Grosseto visibile. Guida alla città e alla sua arte pubblica. Arcidosso: Edizioni Effigi.
