= Museo Collezione Gianfranco Luzzetti =

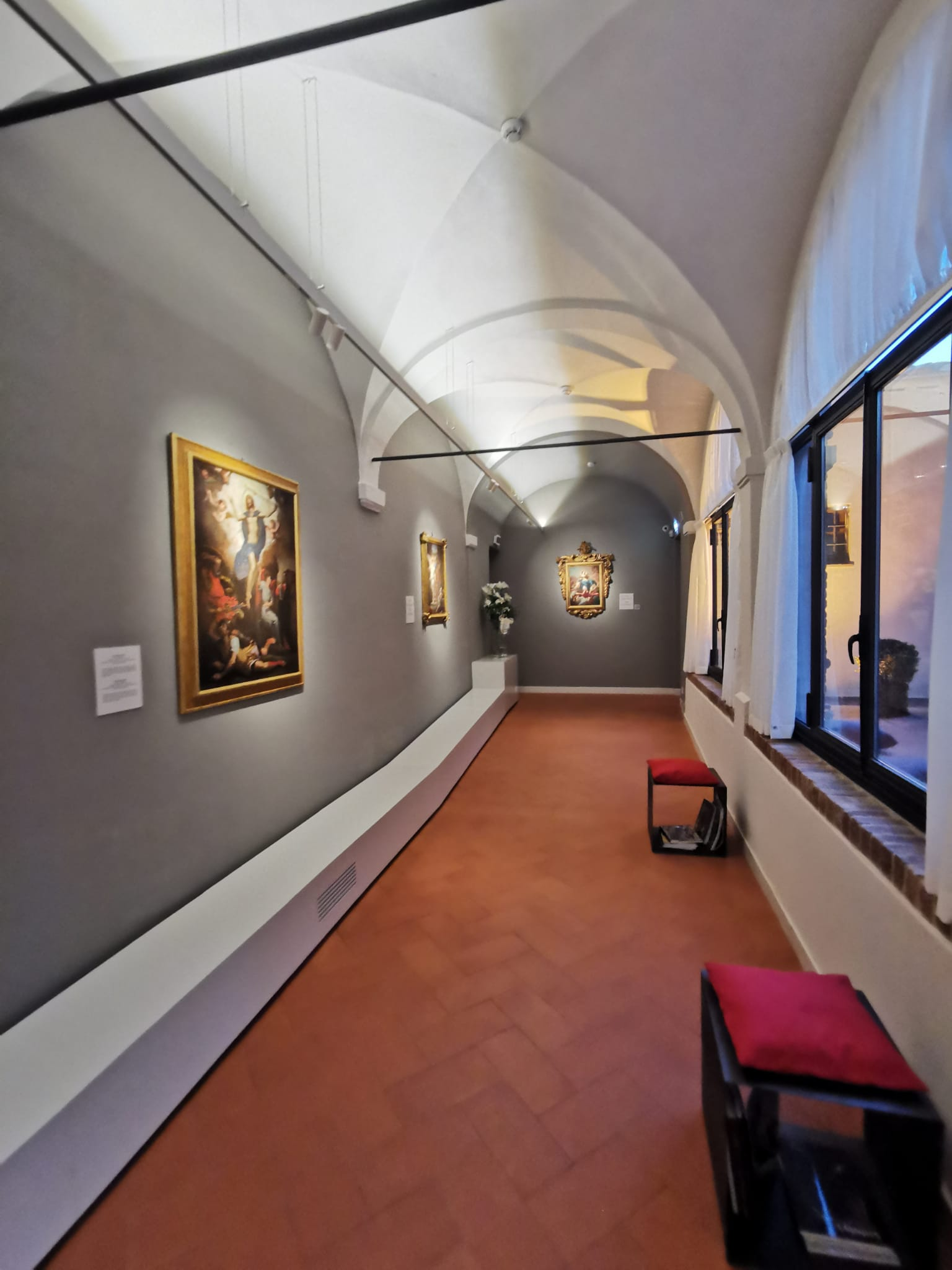
- Established: 22 December 2019; 6 years ago
- Location: Strada Vinzaglio, Grosseto, Tuscany, Italy
- Coordinates: 42°45′37″N 11°06′58″E
- Type: Art museum
- Founder: Gianfranco Luzzetti
- Director: Mauro Papa (since 2019)
- Architect: Cecilia Luzzetti
- Owner: Comune di Grosseto
- Website: www.clarissegrosseto.it

The Museo Collezione Gianfranco Luzzetti (Gianfranco Luzzetti Collection Museum) is an art museum in Grosseto, Tuscany, Italy.

The art gallery is located in a 17th-century former Clarissine convent, home to the city's cultural centre "Le Clarisse", and opened on 22 December 2019. It houses a collection of paintings and sculptures from the Italian Renaissance, Baroque and Neoclassicism, donated to the City of Grosseto by the antiquarian Gianfranco Luzzetti; most notably, the collection include works by artists such as Antonio Rossellino, Giovanni di Tano Fei, Giambologna, Santi di Tito, Domenico Passignano, Cigoli, Rutilio di Lorenzo Manetti, Giovanni Antonio Galli, Pietro Dandini, Camillo Rusconi and Corrado Giaquinto.

== Bibliography ==
- Papa, Mauro (2019). La collezione Gianfranco Luzzetti nel Museo delle Clarisse di Grosseto. Milan: Silvana Editoriale.

== See also ==
- Chiesa dei Bigi
