= Achille Benvoglienti =

Italian physician investigated for heresy

Achille Benvoglienti was an Italian physician active in the Grand Duchy of Tuscany during the 16th century. He is chiefly known for being prosecuted by the Roman Inquisition in 1568–1570 on charges of holding Protestant and Calvinist religious views.

== Life ==
Benvoglienti, a native of Siena, practised medicine in Grosseto. In the early 1540s, he established a small bourgeois religious circle composed of about a dozen members from Siena, Grosseto, and other regions of Italy. The group included the notary Fabio Cioni. The group drew its inspiration from the direct reading of John Calvin's Institutes of the Christian Religion and biblical commentaries, embracing ideas associated with the Protestant Reformation. The circle remained active until 1552, when the outbreak of war between Siena and Florence forced Benvoglienti to leave Grosseto.

In 1568 he was denounced to the Inquisition by Cioni, who revealed his name under torture. On 10 December 1568, the commander of the Siena garrison, Federigo Barbolani di Montauto, informed Francesco I de' Medici, Grand Duke of Tuscany that the Inquisition had arrested Benvoglienti and Attilio Marsili. A third suspect, Leonardo Benvoglienti, was reported to be absent from Siena at the time of the arrests. During his interrogations, Benvoglienti admitted that he had entertained heterodox religious opinions since the 1540s, influenced by the writings of Bernardino Ochino and other reformist authors. Among other beliefs, he questioned the doctrine of transubstantiation, supported communion under both kinds for the laity, and expressed views associated with Protestant teachings on salvation.

The case attracted considerable attention in Siena because of Benvoglienti's social standing and reputation. Although local authorities sought leniency, the Roman Inquisition ordered him to make a public abjuration and sentenced him to imprisonment. The proceedings were eventually transferred to Rome, where he formally abjured his errors on 21 April 1570.

In October 1573, he was recorded as a lecturer in practical medicine at the University of Siena. Contemporary sources suggest that he enjoyed a good reputation as a physician and was at one point consulted in connection with the health of Cosimo I de' Medici.

== Sources ==
- Cantimori, Delio (1939). Eretici italiani del Cinquecento. Ricerche storiche. Florence.
- Cantù, Cesare (1866). Gli eretici d'Italia. Discorsi storici. Vol. 2. Turin.
- Ginzburg, Carlo (1966). "Benvoglienti, Achille". Dizionario Biografico degli Italiani. Vol. 8. Treccani.
- Marchetti, Valerio (1975). Gruppi ereticali senesi del Cinquecento. Florence: La Nuova Italia.
- Piccolomini, P. (1910). "Documenti fiorentini sull'eresia in Siena durante il secolo XVI (1559–1570)". Bullettino Senese di Storia Patria. 17 (2): 170–182.
- Ugurgieri Azzolini, Isidoro (1649). Le pompe sanesi. Vol. 1. Pistoia. p. 530.
