= Episcopal Palace, Grosseto =

Palace in Grosseto, Italy

Episcopal Palace
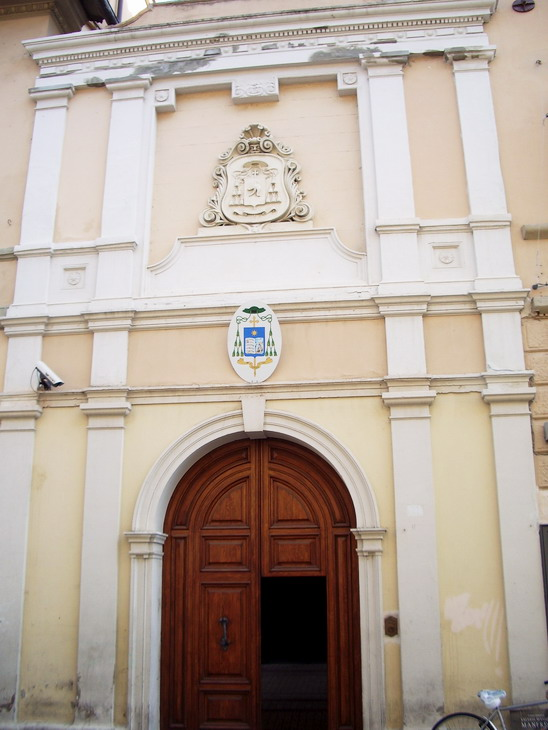
- Interactive map of the Episcopal Palace area

General information
- Type: palazzo
- Architectural style: Neoclassicism
- Location: Corso Carducci; Grosseto, Tuscany
- Coordinates: 42°45′37.99″N 11°06′48.37″E
- Owner: Roman Catholic Diocese of Grosseto

The Episcopal Palace (Italian: Palazzo Vescovile), formerly Palazzo Ariosti, is a building in Grosseto, Tuscany. It is located on Corso Carducci, the main street in the city center, and houses the Bishop's residence, the diocesan offices, and the curia of the Diocese of Grosseto.

== History ==
The building dates back to the 18th century and was originally owned by the Count Ariosti family. Between 1778 and 1780, Count Alfonso Ariosti sold the palace to Mario Nerucci, a member of a noble family from Amiata. On 20 November 1803, Bishop Fabrizio Selvi, who sought to provide the Diocese of Grosseto with a new episcopal residence, purchased the building from Nerucci, in exchange for the Palazzo Gigli, the old episcopal residence adjacent to the Cathedral of San Lorenzo. A few years later, Bishop Selvi hosted Grand Duke Leopold II of Tuscany and Grand Duchess Anna Maria of Saxony in the new episcopal palace, as noted by an inscription.

During the period of sede vacante (1858–1867), following the annexation of the Grand Duchy of Tuscany to the Kingdom of Sardinia, the building served as the first location of the Chelliana Library, opened by Canon Giovanni Chelli in 1860.

The palace was renovated and decorated during the episcopate of Bishop Giovanni Battista Bagalà Blasini (1876–1884), who had all the coats of arms of the bishops of Roselle and Grosseto painted in the main hall. Between 1927 and 1928, Bishop Gustavo Matteoni expanded the building, raising part of it, and restored the façade facing the main street.

The episcopal palace was damaged during World War II by an air raid on 29 November 1943, and was subsequently restored between 1948 and 1951 under the initiative of Bishop Paolo Galeazzi, resulting in the loss of many internal decorations, including the previously mentioned fresco cycle with the coats of arms of the bishops. Further restoration and renovation of the interior spaces occurred between 1961 and 1967. A conservation-restoration of the building was carried out during the episcopate of Angelo Scola (1991–1995).

== Description ==
The Episcopal Palace is an example of neoclassical style, with its main facade facing Corso Carducci. This facade defines a small inner courtyard, together with the lateral facades of the adjacent buildings and the facade of the palace itself. The central entrance portal, topped with a semicircular arch, is surrounded by two horizontal bands at different levels that enclose the coat of arms of the current bishop. Above this, there is a decorative cornice that supports the monumental coat of arms of Bishop Paolo Galeazzi, located in the upper central part of the facade. The facade is divided into three sections by two pairs of pilasters that extend vertically along its entire height.

Inside the palace, the bishop's apartment features four rooms, known as the "Leopoldine Rooms", with ceilings adorned with 18th-century frescoes. One of the frescoes depicts the coat of arms of the Ariosti family. In the chapel, the ceiling is decorated with a trompe-l'œil oculus depicting the glorification of the Ariosti family. Other rooms include an Allegory of Prudence, dating from the late 18th century, and a Madonna and Child with cherubim, dating from the 18th–19th centuries and repainted in the early 20th century by Bishop Ulisse Carlo Bascherini, who was also an amateur painter and created other artworks preserved in the curia offices.

== Sources ==
- Bonelli, Anna; Corso, Letizia (January–April 1994). "La biblioteca comunale Chelliana: note per una descrizione storica". Culture del Testo (1).
- Mariagrazia Celuzza; Mauro Papa, eds. (2013). Grosseto visibile. Guida alla città e alla sua arte pubblica. Arcidosso: Edizioni Effigi.
- Letizia Franchina, ed. (1995). Tra Ottocento e Novecento. Grosseto e la Maremma alla ricerca di una nuova immagine. Siena: Soprintendenza per i beni ambientali e architettonici per le province di Siena e Grosseto.
- Innocenti, Elena; Innocenti, Mario (1993). Grosseto: briciole di storia. Grosseto: Innocenti Editore.
- Mazzini, Vanessa (1996). Immagine e arredo urbano a Grosseto. L'asse della città da Piazza Fratelli Rosselli a Piazza De Maria. Grosseto: I Portici.
- Minucci, Giotto (1988). La città di Grosseto e i suoi vescovi (498–1988). Vol. 2. Florence: Lucio Pugliese.
- Tacconi, Adelmo (January 1968). "Notizie sul Palazzo Vescovile". Rivista diocesana (Diocesi di Grosseto) (1): 47–54.
