= Augusto Corbi =

Italian architect

- Born: 1837; Masse di Siena, Grand Duchy of Tuscany
- Died: 5 September 1901 (aged 63–64); Siena, Kingdom of Italy
- Education: Accademia di Belle Arti di Siena
- Occupation: Architect

Augusto Corbi (1837 – 5 September 1901) was an Italian architect, active mainly in his native Tuscany.

== Life and career ==
Graduating from the Institute of Fine Arts (Istituto di Belle Arti) in Siena, Corbi embarked on his architectural career after a period in Florence.

His contributions are especially remembered for his work in theatre architecture. In 1882, he contributed to the refurbishment of the Accademia degli Intronati within the Palazzo Pubblico, while in 1875 he co-designed, along with Giuseppe Partini, the renovation of the Teatro dei Rozzi. Between 1888 and 1892, Corbi designed the Teatro degli Industri in Grosseto. Additionally, he was responsible for the theater in Chianciano Terme, as well as the renovations of the Teatro degli Smantellati in Sinalunga and the Teatro Poliziano in Montepulciano in 1882.

== Sources ==
- De Gubernatis, Angelo (1889). Dizionario degli artisti italiani viventi: pittori, scultori e architetti. Florence: Successori Le Monnier. p. 140.
- Kannès, Gianluca (1983). "CORBI, Augusto". Dizionario Biografico degli Italiani (in Italian). Vol. 28: Conforto–Cordero. Rome: Istituto dell'Enciclopedia Italiana. ISBN 978-88-12-00032-6.
