= Museo di storia naturale della Maremma =

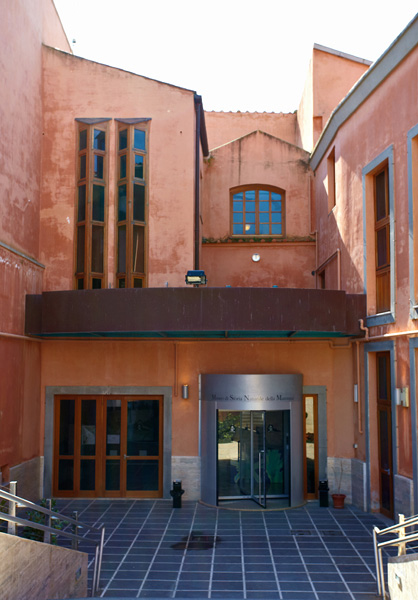
- Former name: Museo civico di storia naturale di Grosseto
- Established: 1971; 55 years ago
- Location: Strada Corsini, Grosseto, Tuscany, Italy
- Coordinates: 42°45′37″N 11°06′58″E
- Type: Natural history museum
- Founder: Giuseppe Guerrini
- Director: Andrea Sforzi (since 1997)
- Owner: Comune di Grosseto
- Website: www.museonaturalemaremma.it

The Museo di storia naturale della Maremma (Museum of Natural History of Maremma) is a natural history museum in Grosseto, Tuscany, Italy.

Located on Strada Corsini, at the southeastern edge of Piazza della Palma, the museum is dedicated to exploring the natural heritage of the Grosseto area. It features exhibits on the geological and biological evolution of the Maremma region, showcasing fossils, minerals, and diverse ecosystems through interactive displays and dioramas. The museum was founded in 1971 by naturalist Giuseppe Guerrini and completely renewed in 2009.

== History ==
The first attempt to establish a historical-naturalistic museum in Grosseto occurred in 1961, when the Municipality of Grosseto provided the Maremma Speleological and Naturalist Society, led by naturalist Giuseppe Guerrini, with a building to preserve its findings and collections. This provisional arrangement generated significant interest in the city, and the unexpectedly successful exhibition in 1967 prompted the administration to consider creating a dedicated natural history museum. In 1971, the Civic Museum of Natural History of Grosseto (Museo civico di storia naturale di Grosseto) was officially inaugurated. Guerrini served as president of the museum until 1997.

From 1981 to 2002, the museum was housed in a small building on Via Mazzini. It was later relocated to the restored former "Vittorio Emanuele" municipal kindergarten on Strada Corsini. After a period during which the museum remained closed to the public for an extended time, it finally reopened in 2009 under its new name: the Museum of Natural History of Maremma. The reopening ceremony, held on 14 November 2009, was preceded by a lecture from Piero Angela.

== Description ==
The Museum of Natural History is arranged across three floors, with 12 exhibition rooms located on the first and second floors, while the ground floor houses a ticket office, a bookstore, a conference room, and a library. The exhibits are divided into two main sections: "Earth Sciences" and "Life Sciences".

=== Earth Sciences ===
This section focuses on the geological and paleontological evolution of Grosseto and the Maremma region.

- Minerals and Rocks: Displays specimens from local areas, including the Metalliferous Hills, Mount Amiata, and the Grosseto plain. Highlights include a 1.9-meter-tall selenite crystal, fluorescent minerals in an interactive showcase, and reconstructions of Mount Amiata's volcanic cone and the Argentarola Island submerged cave.
- Paleontology: Features fossils spanning from the Jurassic to the Pleistocene. A life-size reconstruction of Oreopithecus bambolii, based on fossils found in Baccinello in 1958, is showcased along with prehistoric tools and artifacts from the Maremma.

=== Life Sciences ===
This section features samples and models displayed within their natural habitats, beginning in the "Water Hall", which illustrates marine and coastal wetlands.

- Coastal and Inland Ecosystems: Showcases Maremma's wildlife, with displays on carnivores, amphibians, reptiles, and birds of prey. Dioramas highlight endangered species like the Italian roe deer and hare. An "ecological pathway" explores the region's diverse ecosystems, including islands, coastal dunes, urban areas, and ancient cave routes.
- Highland and Mountain Environments: Focuses on habitats suitable for species such as wolves and wildcats, with dioramas depicting nocturnal scenes at higher altitudes.

Finally, a life-sized cave reconstruction offers interactive information about biospeleology and the unique cave systems of the Maremma.

== Sources ==
- Mariagrazia Celuzza; Mauro Papa, eds. (2013). Grosseto visibile. Guida alla città e alla sua arte pubblica. Arcidosso: Edizioni Effigi.
- Guerrini, Giuseppe (1971). Museo civico di storia naturale: catalogo della I esposizione. Grosseto: La Commerciale.
- Guerrini, Giuseppe (1981). Guida al museo civico di storia naturale. Grosseto: Comune di Grosseto.
- Semplici, Andrea (2012). La Maremma dei musei. Viaggio emozionale nell'arte, la storia, la natura, le tradizioni del territorio grossetano. Arcidosso: Edizioni Effigi.
