= Giovanni Chelli =

Italian prelate and librarian (1809–1869)

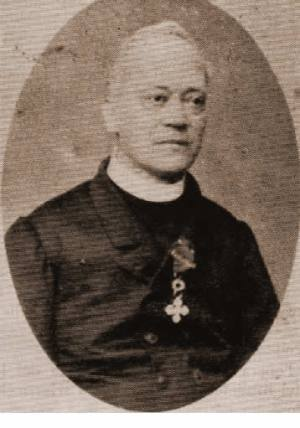
- Born: 5 November 1809; Siena, Ombrone, French Empire
- Died: 8 December 1869 (aged 60); Grosseto, Kingdom of Italy
- Occupations: Prelate, librarian

Giovanni Chelli (5 November 1809 – 8 December 1869) was an Italian prelate and librarian. Canon of the Grosseto Cathedral, Chelli was a controversial figure, a republican and liberal priest who supported the provisional democratic government of Francesco Domenico Guerrazzi and opposed Pope Pius IX. A strong supporter of Unification of Italy, he was friends with Risorgimento figures like Costantino Nigra, Giovan Pietro Vieusseux, and Bettino Ricasoli. His political stance led to years of exile, surveillance, and censorship. He is the founder of the Chelliana Library in Grosseto.

== Early life and education ==
Born in Siena in 1809, Chelli moved to Grosseto in 1821. He was ordained as a priest in 1833 and graduated with a degree in theology from the University of Siena in 1835. He was later appointed Canon of the Cathedral of Grosseto and in 1840 became Rector of the Apostolic Penitentiary.

== Political activism ==
An eccentric and controversial figure, Chelli published articles in the 1840s for the Corriere Livornese, openly praising Pope Pius IX and especially Leopold II of Tuscany, to whom he dedicated the 1846 book La Maremma personificata, on the occasion of the inauguration of the monument to the grand duke in Grosseto. In 1848, he published Sulla necessità di una via ferrata da Grosseto a Siena e da Grosseto ai Confini dello Stato Pontificio ("On the Necessity of a Railway Line from Grosseto to Siena, and from Grosseto to the Papal States"), also denouncing the poor conditions of Maremma. That same year, Chelli declared himself a republican, shifting to extremist positions and renouncing Pius IX. He openly supported the 1849 provisional democratic government led by Francesco Domenico Guerrazzi, but the following year, with the return of the grand duke, he was forced into exile, which lasted only a few months as he was summoned to retract his positions.

Returning to Grosseto, he adopted moderate liberal ideologies, supporting the Unification of Italy and backing Bettino Ricasoli, with whom he had a friendship. He was also linked to prominent Risorgimento figures like Costantino Nigra, Vincenzo Salvagnoli, and Giovan Pietro Vieusseux, with whom he had frequent correspondence.

== The Chelliana Library ==
Starting in 1858, Chelli worked to create a place in Grosseto for collecting writings and art objects, aimed at spreading knowledge to the public and assuming an educational role for all the inhabitants of the Maremma over the years. This initiated a slow and decisive effort against illiteracy, supported by the implementation of the Leopoldine Law of 1852 and the Casati Law of 1861.

The canon submitted a petition to the Cathedral Chapter, which, meeting on 30 December 1858, decided that Chelli should be granted the direction of the library, combined with the antiquarium. The original library collection consisted of about 5,000 volumes, including many sixteenth-century editions and valuable works, thanks to donations from Bishop Giovanni Domenico Mensini, Domenico Pizzetti, the capitular vicar of the Diocese of Grosseto, and Chelli himself.

With the death of Bishop Mensini and the vacant see, Chelli was elected capitular vicar, a choice that provoked reactions from ecclesiastical authorities who appealed. Chelli decreed that in every church in the Diocese of Grosseto, a prayer should be recited in honor of King Victor Emmanuel II, a move frowned upon by the Pope, who upheld the appeal of his detractors and removed him from office. Nevertheless, the Chelliana Library was inaugurated on 1 March 1860, and the following month King Victor Emmanuel II summoned him to Siena, where he decorated him with the cross of the Order of Saints Maurice and Lazarus to honor his merits.

== Later years and death ==
With the Unification of Italy in 1861, Chelli's political positions again put him in bad light within the ecclesiastical realm, as in his writings he advocated for a return to the early Church, completely detached from temporal powers and entirely separate from the state, which should be strictly secular.

Giovanni Chelli died in Grosseto on 8 December 1869.

== Sources ==
- Bonelli, Anna; Corso, Letizia (January–April 1994). "La biblioteca comunale Chelliana: note per una descrizione storica". Culture del Testo (1).
- Anna Bosco; Luca Seravalle (2009). Il carteggio del canonico Giovanni Chelli. 1844-1865. Pisa: Pacini Editore.
- Bottasso, Enzo (1984). Storia della biblioteca in Italia. Milan: Editrice Bibliografica. pp. 274–275, 329.
- Mariagrazia Celuzza (2007). Museo archeologico e d'arte della Maremma. Museo d'arte sacra della Diocesi di Grosseto. Siena: Nuova Immagine.
- Ersilio Michel (1930). "Giovanni Chelli". In Michele Rosi (ed.). Dizionario del Risorgimento nazionale. Vol. 2. Milan: Vallardi.
- Vitali, Aladino (1969). "Il canonico Giovanni Chelli e l'origine risorgimentale della Biblioteca Chelliana di Grosseto". Almanacco dei bibliotecari italiani. Rome: Palombi.
