= Bombing of Grosseto in World War II =

Bombing of Grosseto
- Part of Strategic bombing during World War II
- Location: Grosseto, Tuscany, Italy
- Date: 26 April 1943
- Target: City of Grosseto
- Attack type: Cluster bombing
- Deaths: At least 134
- Injuries: Unknown
- Perpetrators: 97th and 301st Bombardment Group of the United States Army Air Force
- Motive: Unknown

The bombing of Grosseto took place on 26 April 1943, day of Easter Monday, during World War II. Aimed at disabling the city's air base, it resulted instead in heavy damage to the city itself and at least 134 civilian casualties.

== History ==
The Grosseto Air Base was considered by the Allies to be of strategic importance for operations in North Africa, since the attackers on British ships in the western Mediterranean Sea departed from there. The base was also the site of a torpedo-bomber training school of the Luftwaffe's Kampfgeschwader 102 unit and the arrival of the Messerschmitts Me 323 employed in the defense of Tunisia. This led to several Allied air raids aimed at its destruction.

The first raid took place on 26 April 1943, day of Easter Monday, when 48 Boeing B-17 Flying Fortress of the Twelfth Air Force of the United States Army took off from airfields in Algeria and reached Grosseto, Tuscany. For unknown reasons, 19 of the 48 military planes dropped 2,000 cluster bombs on the city of Grosseto, instead of on the targeted airport.

The raid began at 2 PM, when most of the people were in the streets celebrating the holiday. The air raid sirens did not sound and the population did not go to the air raid shelters which had been set up in the ramparts of the city's walls.

At least 134 inhabitants of Grosseto were killed, mostly children aged between 5 and 14 who were playing at a funfair in the Porta Vecchia suburb.

The Grosseto airport, objective of the raid, was hit but slightly damaged; at the same time, however, the suburbs of Grosseto located around the historic centre suffered heavy damage. The raid also hit care buildings such as the Red Cross hospital set up in the diocese's seminary and the House of Mother and Child.

The following day, 27 April, King Victor Emmanuel III went to Grosseto to pay homage to the fallen and to visit the wounded in the Misericordia hospital.

The raid was condemned by the Italian national press and the Catholic Church for its involvement of civilians, especially children. The newspaper Corriere della Sera published an article on 5 May 1943 entitled No Italian will forget the children tortured by gangsters.

== Further raids ==
After this attack, Grosseto suffered further heavy raids by both the USAAF and the Royal Air Force from May 1943 to June 1944. All these raids were aimed at either the airfield, which was destroyed on 20 May killing 1,600 German soldiers, or the railway station, destroyed on 9 September, but caused further damage and casualties to the city as well.

Several historical buildings were also hit, such as the Palazzo Mensini, home to the Chelliana Library and the Archaeological Museum, the Episcopal Palace, and the Art Museum of the Diocese of Grosseto. The 16th-century Casino delle Palle was completely destroyed.

== Reconstruction ==
The city's reconstruction began after the proclamation of the Italian Republic, with the Piano parziale di ricostruzione implemented by the Comune in 1948. The massive destruction of an area of the historic centre led to the creation of a new square, Piazza della Palma.

Bishop Paolo Galeazzi commissioned the construction of a basilica to pay homage to the fallen in the bombings. The Basilica of Sacro Cuore di Gesù was consecrated on 26 April 1958, anniversary of the Easter Monday massacre. The church's crypt is also decorated with the names of the civilians died in the bombings.

== Bibliography ==
- Bonacina, Giorgio (1970). Obiettivo: Italia. I bombardamenti aerei delle città italiane dal 1940 al 1945. Milano: Mursia. pp. 183–184.
- Campagna, Stefano; Turbanti, Adolfo (2022). Antifascismo, guerra e resistenze in Maremma. Arcidosso: Effigi.
- Celuzza, Mariagrazia; Papa, Mauro (2013). Grosseto visibile. Guida alla città e alla sua arte pubblica. Arcidosso: Effigi.
- Ghiara, Silvio; Scarlini, Guido (2003). Operazione "Uovo di Pasqua". Grosseto, 26 aprile 1943. Grosseto: Innocenti.
