= Giovanni Domenico Mensini =

Italian Roman Catholic bishop (1801–1858)

Giovanni Domenico Francesco Mensini
- Bishop of Grosseto
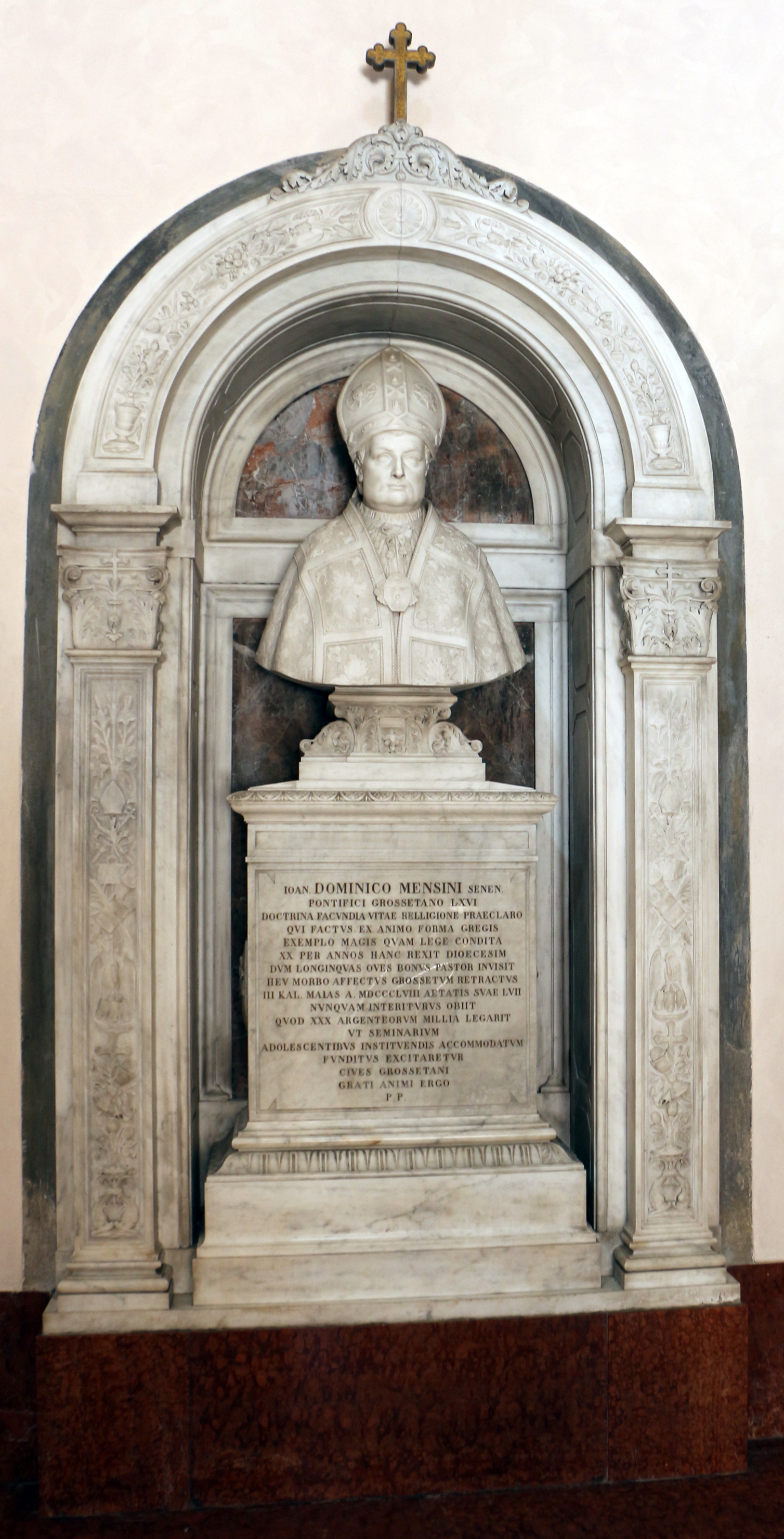
- Bust of Mensini, sculpted by Luigi Cartei, in the Grosseto Cathedral
- Church: Catholic Church
- Diocese: Diocese of Grosseto
- In office: 2 October 1837 – 29 April 1858
- Predecessor: Fabrizio Selvi
- Successor: Anselmo Fauli

Orders
- Ordination: 20 September 1823
- Consecration: 12 November 1837 by Giuseppe Mancini

Personal details
- Born: 23 March 1801 Siena, Kingdom of Etruria, French Republic
- Died: 29 April 1858 (aged 57)

Giovanni Domenico Francesco Mensini (23 March 1801 – 29 April 1858) was an Italian Roman Catholic prelate. He was bishop of Grosseto from 1837 to 1858.

A native of Siena, Mensini was appointed by Pope Gregory XVI on 2 October 1837. He died on 29 April 1858.

== Sources ==
- Bruna Bocchini Camaiani (1994). "I vescovi toscani nel periodo lorenese". Istituzioni e società in Toscana nell'età moderna. Rome. pp. 681–716.
- Giotto Minucci (1988). La città di Grosseto e i suoi vescovi (498-1988). Vol. 2. Florence: Lucio Pugliese.
