= Palazzo delle Poste, Grosseto =

Palace in Grosseto, Italy

Palazzo delle Poste
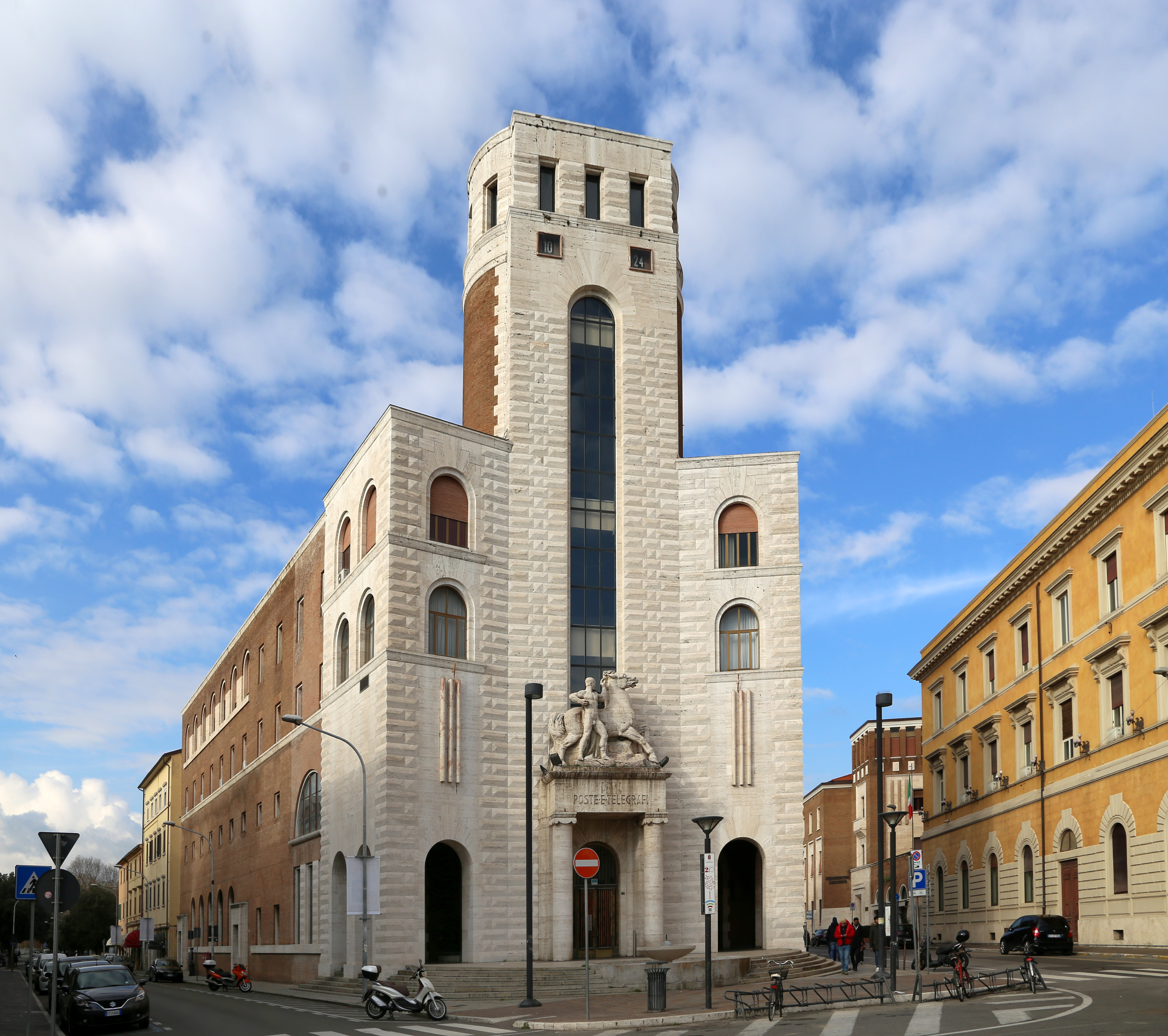
- Interactive map of the Palazzo delle Poste area

General information
- Architectural style: Fascist architecture Rationalism
- Location: Piazza Fratelli Rosselli; Grosseto, Tuscany, Italy
- Coordinates: 42°45′50.22″N 11°06′42.7″E
- Construction started: 4 February 1931
- Completed: 20 October 1932
- Inaugurated: 13 November 1932; 93 years ago
- Owner: Poste Italiane

Design and construction
- Architect: Angiolo Mazzoni

The Palazzo delle Poste (transl. Post Office Building) is an administrative building which serves as the Poste Italiane headquarters in Grosseto, Tuscany. It was designed by architect Angiolo Mazzoni and completed in 1932. The building features an exterior in a monumental style, typical of the Fascist architecture, while the interior is characterized by a closer alignment with the modern principles of Italian rationalism. It also houses sculptures by Napoleone Martinuzzi and Domenico Ponzi.

== Location ==
The building is situated in the suburb of Porta Nuova, outside the city walls, and is bordered by Via Roma and Viale Giacomo Matteotti, overlooking Piazza Fratelli Rosselli, formerly Piazza Umberto I, and commonly known as Piazza della Vasca. It serves as a key visual landmark aligned with Via Fallaci, leading into the historic center. The square features significant architecture from different periods and styles: the neo-classical Palazzo del Governo; Ludovico Quaroni's modern multi-purpose building from the 1970s; the Villino Panichi with its Renaissance Revival and Art Nouveau-style elements; and the austere former Royal Normal School (now "Giovanni Pascoli" middle school).

== History ==
As part of Benito Mussolini's plan to tackle unemployment, Decree No. 10102 on 8 July 1930, authorized the construction of the Post and Telegraph Building in Grosseto, designed by architect Angiolo Mazzoni. Mazzoni selected a site in a circular square named after Umberto I, outside the city walls in the suburb of Porta Nuova. After initial design revisions, the final project was completed by June 1930. Expropriations began in April, and demolition of existing buildings, including the recently built Art Nouveau-style Palazzo Barth, started in September.

The masonry contract was awarded to Milan's Rusconi Carlo company in September 1930, with a significant discount on the estimated cost. The work, which began on 4 February 1931, and involved around 120 workers daily, was completed by 20 October 1932. Marble, travertine, and granite were supplied by Società Marmifera Nord Carrara of Montecatini group. The building was inaugurated on 13 November 1932, in the presence of King Victor Emmanuel III. Additional completion works were approved in August 1939.

Post-war modifications included raising the central body of the building in 1953 (completed in 1955), constructing a new single-story section for mail carriers in 1963, and expanding the public hall and director's apartment in 1975. A request was made in 1983 to raise the eastern wing on Via Roma.

== Description ==
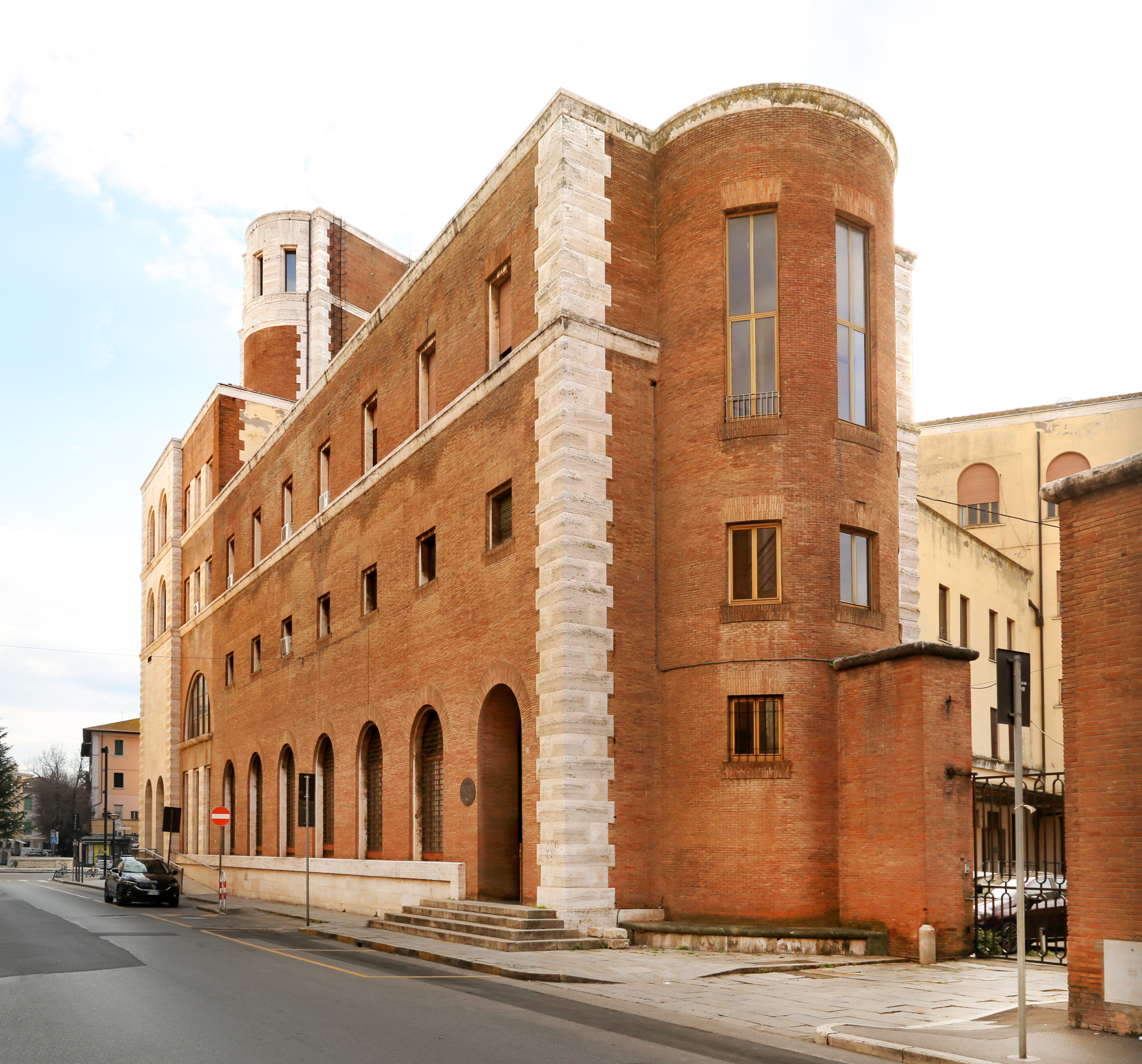
The building's rear on Via Roma

=== Exterior ===
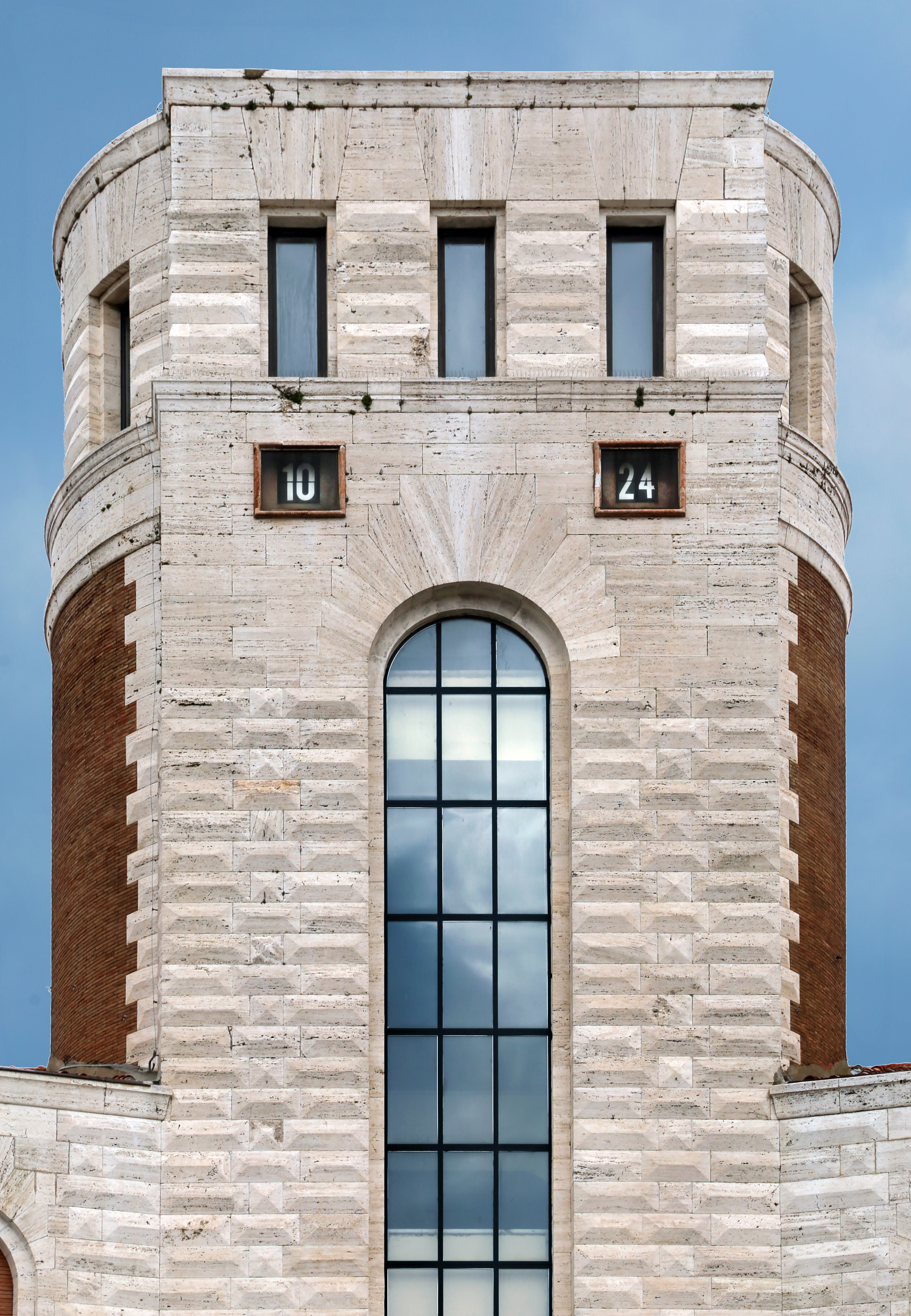
The clock tower

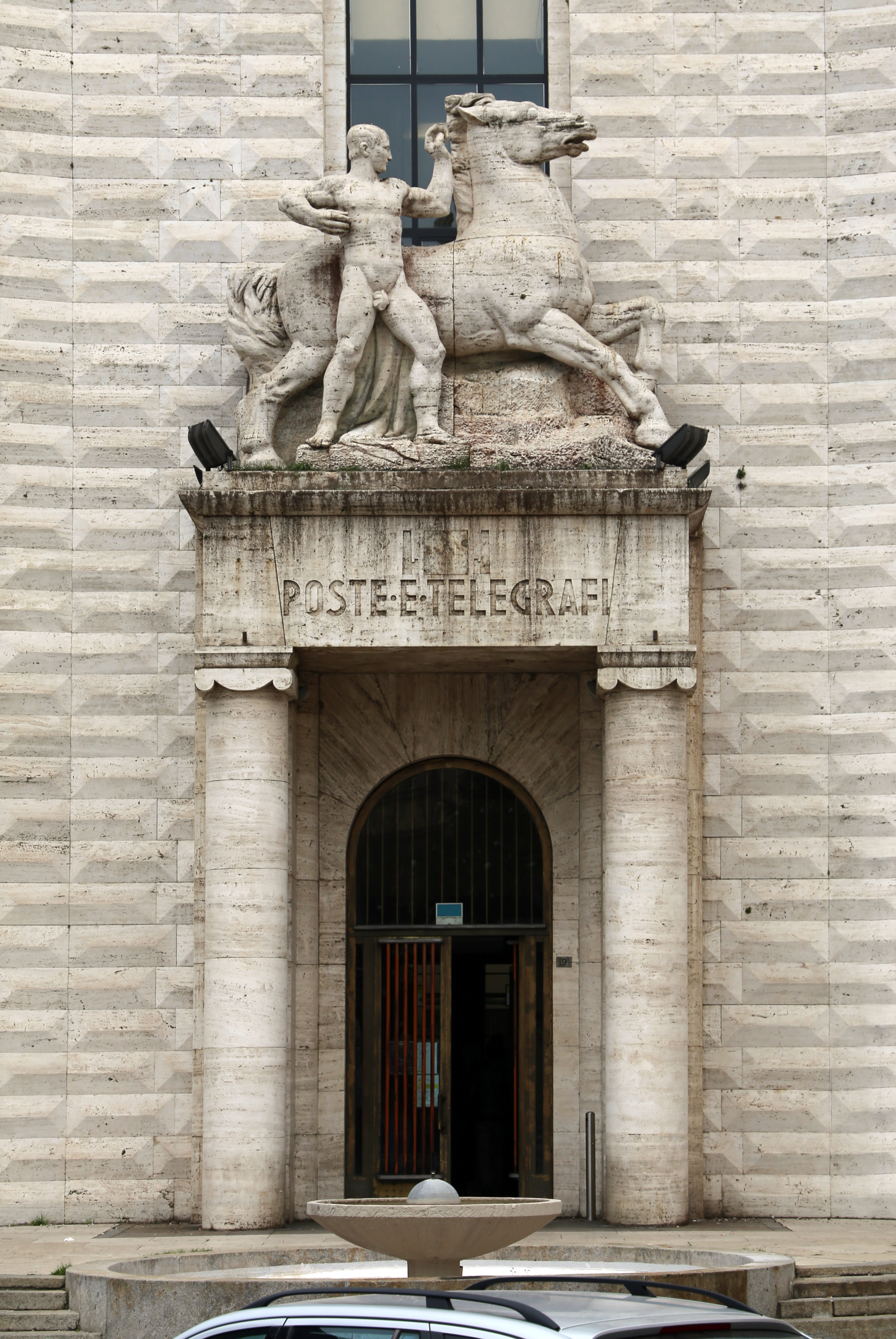
The main portal with the Tamed Maremma group by Napoleone Martinuzzi

The building is a city landmark with a monumental and rhetorical style. It has a trapezoidal plan due to the plot's shape, leading to an unconventional layout along the bisector of the angle formed by the adjacent streets. The main section, facing Piazza Rosselli, is clad in Rapolano travertine and features entrance arches. This section is connected to two nearly symmetrical wings along Via Roma and Viale Matteotti, with central spaces linking them and overlooking a rear service courtyard.

The main facade, about 20 meters high, is divided into three parts, highlighted by a monumental portal with a lintel supported by Ionic columns and topped by the marble group of Maremma Domata ("Tamed Maremma") by Napoleone Martinuzzi. A prominent elliptical tower, containing the main staircase, serves as a visual and functional hinge between the wings. The tower's verticality is accentuated by a central window illuminating the staircase and directing attention to small clock openings below the windowed loggia at the top.

The facade's slight concavity follows the square's circular shape, balanced by a convex granite staircase leading to a paved plaza in Rapolano travertine. This plaza features a circular fountain with a Portasanta marble basin and a central diorite sphere. Smaller portals, framed by Portasanta marble fasces, lead to elegant rooms with high-quality materials, including yellow marble from Mori and green Alpi marble benches.

Original glass and brass lights are found by the entrances to the public hall, which has wooden paneling with integrated neon lighting. The right-side room, missing a marble bench, features a bronze statue of Saint Christopher by Martinuzzi.

The long facades on Via Roma and Viale Matteotti, rising over three floors plus a mezzanine, have regular window sequences: larger and arched on the ground floor, square on the mezzanine, and rectangular above. These facades are brick-clad with travertine accents, including floor bands, frames, and corner elements. Above the entrance arches to the small rooms, two large tripartite windows with thermal lunettes illuminate the public hall. The facade on Via Roma includes a service entrance arch and a small cross-shaped space paved with blue ceramic tiles. The eastern end features a semicircular stairwell volume with increasing vertical windows and a perimeter wall with a gate to the rear courtyard.

=== Interior ===
The building's interior features an atrium accessed through the main portal, with an elliptical layout. The atrium combines exposed brick walls with Apuan violet cipollino marble flooring and Portasanta pink marble bands. Walls are finished with violet cipollino frames and illuminated by original glass and brass wall lights. A black marble portal leads to the public hall, while a white Carrara marble statue by Domenico Ponzi, La madre ("The Mother"), stands on a Portasanta marble pedestal.

To the right of the entrance, a large elliptical staircase, over 9 meters in diameter, begins. The staircase, with 185 steps and large landings, is clad in Apuan violet cipollino marble and includes a marble handrail.

The public hall, about 20 by 8 meters and 6 meters high, features a classical design with slightly concave main walls, illuminated by tripartite windows and lunettes. The ceiling has exposed brick vaulting, with original glass and brass chandeliers. The floor, originally ceramic tiles framed by red Amiata marble, is now marble slabbed.

Black marble writing desks are positioned around the hall, with additional marble desks, benches, and radiator sills. All furnishings and functional objects were designed by Mazzoni.

Beyond the hall, private rooms and a smaller second hall with counters are located. A secondary staircase in white Garfagnana marble connects to the service entrance. On the first floor, the space is divided into three rooms, with the central room for meetings and paved with Portasanta marble. Offices in the lateral wings are accessed via corridors.

== Critical reception ==
The post office palace was initially seen as "a bold attempt at fascist-era art, blending classical elements with a well-understood modernity" and celebrated for its use of fine marbles. In the context of a broader reevaluation of Angiolo Mazzoni's architectural work over the past years, the building is recognized as an example of "heavy yet evocative monumentalism", possessing "a vaguely sinister metaphysical allure".

According to Quattrocchi (2006), the building "redeems itself from the heavy monumentalism of the exterior through the beautiful and functional interiors, which find a remarkable and evocative spatial wisdom in the episode of the helical staircase occupying the tower", adding that this differentiation between exterior and interior takes on "the sense of a transition from a casual yet predictable historicism to a more streamlined and internationally 'modern' language".

== Sources ==
- Grosseto fuori Porta Nuova. Lo sviluppo di Grosseto a nord delle mura dalla metà dell'Ottocento al secondo dopoguerra. Grosseto: Innocenti Editore. 2009.
- Mariagrazia Celuzza; Mauro Papa, eds. (2013). Grosseto visibile. Guida alla città e alla sua arte pubblica. Arcidosso: Edizioni Effigi.
- Enrico Crispolti; Anna Mazzanti; Luca Quattrocchi, eds. (2006). Arte in Maremma nella prima metà del Novecento. Milano: Silvana Editoriale.
- Alfredo Forti (1978). Angiolo Mazzoni architetto fra fascismo e libertà. Florence: Edam.
- Innocenti, Mario; Innocenti, Elena (1993). Grosseto:briciole di storia. Cartoline e documenti d'epoca 1899-1944. Grosseto: Innocenti Editore.
- Egidio Santelmo (1932). "Il palazzo delle Poste e Telegrafi a Grosseto". Marmi Pietre Graniti (6).
