= Francesco Ponticelli =

Italian politician, lawyer and banker (1888–1968)

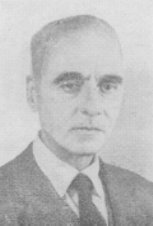
- Ponticelli in 1946

Member of the Constituent Assembly of Italy
- In office 15 July 1946 – 12 September 1946

President of Banca Monte dei Paschi di Siena
- In office 1954–1959

Personal details
- Born: 12 April 1888 Siena, Kingdom of Italy
- Died: 31 March 1968 (aged 79)
- Political party: Christian Democracy
- Occupation: Lawyer, banker

Francesco Ponticelli (12 April 1888 – 31 March 1968) was an Italian politician, lawyer and banker who served as a member of the Constituent Assembly of Italy in 1946 and president of the Banca Monte dei Paschi di Siena from 1954 to 1959.

== Life and career ==
Born to Stefano Ponticelli and Annunziata Del Punta, in a wealthy family of landowners from Grosseto, he graduated in law and practiced as a lawyer.

In the years following World War I, he, along with his brother Alfredo, undertook the land transformation of their properties between Principina and Le Strillaie, promoting the construction of a road network, hydraulic-agricultural improvements of the land, and the establishment of a grid of farmhouses and stables. In 1927, within the Grand Hotel Bastiani, he signed the founding act of the Consorzio di Bonifica Grossetana, along with eight other landowners.

Initially enrolled in the Italian People's Party, Ponticelli was one of the most prominent advocates for the establishment of the Christian Democracy party in the provinces of Grosseto and Siena. In July 1946, he was elected as a deputy for the DC in the Constituent Assembly but resigned in September, leaving his position to Reginaldo Monticelli.

From 1954 to 1959, he served as president of Banca Monte dei Paschi di Siena.

== Sources ==
- Marco Laurito; Simonetta Soldatini (2004). Censimento delle fonti d'archivio per la storia del '900 nella provincia di Grosseto. Florence: Società Editrice Fiorentina.
- Francesco Malgeri (1989). Storia della Democrazia cristiana. Dalla Resistenza alla Repubblica, 1943-1948. Rome: Edizioni Cinque Lune.
- Lucio Niccolai (2008). L'odore della terra. Biografie di uomini e donne che hanno fatto la Maremma dalla montagna al mare. Arcidosso: Effigi.
- Ettore Rotelli (1980). La Ricostruzione in Toscana dal CLN ai partiti. I partiti politici. Bologna: Il Mulino.
