= Palazzo Aldobrandeschi =

Palace in Grosseto, Italy

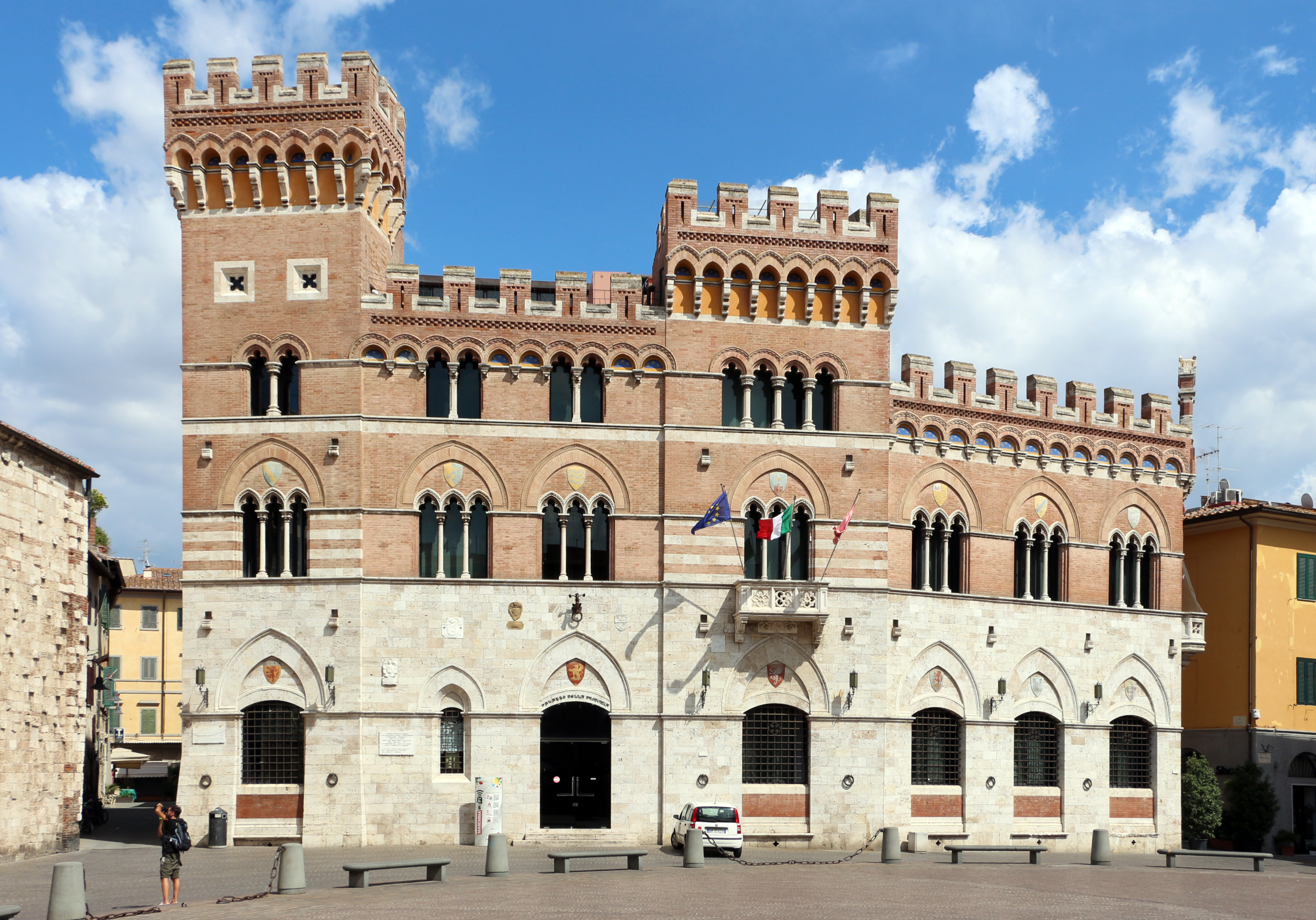
- The main facade on Piazza Dante
- Interactive map of the Palazzo Aldobrandeschi area

General information
- Type: palazzo, public building
- Architectural style: Gothic Revival
- Location: Piazza Dante, 35; Grosseto, Tuscany; Italy
- Coordinates: 42°45′35″N 11°06′51″E
- Named for: Aldobrandeschi
- Construction started: 5 April 1900
- Completed: 1903
- Inaugurated: 31 May 1903; 122 years ago
- Cost: ₤68,408
- Owner: Province of Grosseto

Design and construction
- Architect: Lorenzo Porciatti

Palazzo Aldobrandeschi, or Palazzo della Provincia, is the seat of the provincial government of Grosseto, Italy, and it is located in Piazza Dante, the main square of the city. It was designed in a Gothic Revival style by architect Lorenzo Porciatti and completed in 1903. It is named after the ancient family Aldobrandeschi, since it was erroneously believed this was the location of the Aldobrandeschi's castle during the Middle Ages.

== History ==
At the beginning of 1898, five hundred citizens of Grosseto sent a petition to the Provincial Council for the purchase and restoration of the ancient Palazzo Pretorio, with the aim of using it as the provincial offices. The palace, which had long been home to civil magistracies and public offices, was at that time occupied by private apartments and shops and was made up of four different sections. After abandoning the idea of building a new headquarters outside the city walls due to strong opposition from the population, the Provincial Council decided to proceed with a new construction project for the building, demolishing the existing structures. The project was assigned to architect Lorenzo Porciatti and engineer Ciriaco Salvadori. The judging committee, chaired by architect Guglielmo Calderini, chose Porciatti's design, considering both the costs and the aesthetic aspect of the work.

The completed project, different from the one submitted to the committee, was substantially revised and modified on Calderini's advice. Demolition work began in the autumn of 1899, and construction, carried out by the Piero Ciabatti company from Grosseto at a total cost of 68,408 lire, commenced on 5 April 1900.

The new palace was officially inaugurated on 31 May 1903, in the presence of the authorities.

== Description ==
=== Exterior ===
The building is situated in Grosseto's historic center, on Piazza Dante. It features a polygonal plan and a complex volume spread over two, three, and four floors plus a mezzanine. The facade, which is Gothic Revival, is asymmetrical and divided into four parts: two tall towers and two lower sections. The ground floor is characterized by a travertine base with various openings, including a portico and windows. The noble floor displays symmetrical trifore windows and a central balcony with Renaissance-style marble brackets. The third floor includes bifore and quadrifore windows, with the facade topped by a crenellated attic. The western side has brick masonry and a travertine-loggia, while the eastern side is a plain brick curtain.

=== Interior ===
The interior features a Gothic-style vestibule with decorative paintings and a vaulted ceiling. The stone staircase was restored in the 1990s. To the right of the vestibule is a large, recently renovated meeting room and service areas. To the left are the porter's office, service staircase, and elevator. The central staircase, also medieval in appearance, features a cross-vaulted ceiling and stone columns. The noble floor contains the director's offices and the Provincial Council Chamber, which is decorated in Gothic Revival style and has wooden furniture designed by the architect. The third floor, accessed via the service stairs, houses offices, while the fourth floor includes a single room within the western tower and a multi-level terrace.

== Critical reception ==
The construction of the palace was strongly desired by the people of Grosseto and was received with enthusiasm: "from a decorative standpoint, Grosseto will be given back one of its finest civic monuments, restoring with the elegant Sienese Gothic style one of those buildings marred by human ignorance and the barbarism of the times".

According to Quattrocchi (2006), "in a triumph of triforiums, battlements, and corbels, the Provincial Palace is a vivid and skillful medieval setting" and "a glorious urban backdrop that successfully defines, with necessary scenographic emphasis, one of the pivotal spaces in the historic center, providing the square with the monumental prominence it lacked". Longo (2006), observing the interiors, highlights how "the frescoed walls, the decorations on the beams, and the carvings of the seats and benches—personally designed by the architect—testify to the intention of recreating the style of medieval palaces, perhaps even capturing the atmosphere of the construction site, where there was no distinction between designer and craftsmen".

== Sources ==
- Innocenti, Elena; Innocenti, Mario (1993). Grosseto: briciole di storia. Grosseto: Innocenti Editore. pp. 173–178.
- Mariagrazia Celuzza; Mauro Papa, eds. (2013). Grosseto visibile. Guida alla città e alla sua arte pubblica. Arcidosso: Edizioni Effigi.
- Enrico Crispolti; Anna Mazzanti; Luca Quattrocchi, eds. (2006). Arte in Maremma nella prima metà del Novecento. Milan: Silvana Editoriale.
- Letizia Franchina, ed. (1995). Tra Ottocento e Novecento. Grosseto e la Maremma alla ricerca di una nuova immagine. Siena: Soprintendenza per i beni ambientali e architettonici per le province di Siena e Grosseto.
- Mazzini, Vanessa (1996). Immagine e arredo urbano a Grosseto. L'asse della città da Piazza Fratelli Rosselli a Piazza De Maria. Grosseto: I Portici.

== See also ==
- Aldobrandeschi
- Grosseto Cathedral
- Piazza Dante, Grosseto
