= Piazza Dante, Grosseto =

Public square in Grosseto, Italy

Piazza Dante
- Piazza delle Catene
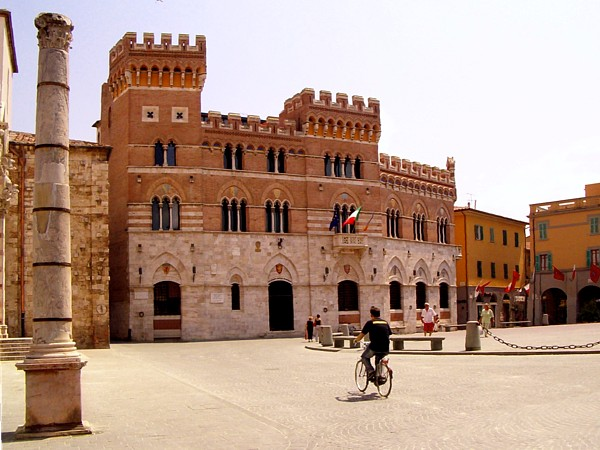

- Location within Tuscany
- Former names: Piazza del Comune; Piazza Grande; Piazza Vittorio Emanuele II
- Namesake: Dante Alighieri
- Location: Grosseto, Tuscany, Italy
- Coordinates: 42°45′34″N 11°06′49″E

Construction
- Completion: 13th century

Other
- Status: pedestrianised

Piazza Dante (also known as Piazza delle Catene, lit. 'Chains' Square') is the main public square in Grosseto, Tuscany, Italy.

The piazza is located in the city's historic centre, included within the perimeter of the 16th-century city walls. It is home to some of the city's main buildings, including the St. Lawrence Cathedral and the Palazzo Aldobrandeschi, seat of the Province of Grosseto. It borders north with the Piazza del Duomo, overlooked by the cathedral's façade.

== History ==
The main square of the city of Grosseto is documented as Platea Communis starting from 1222. The original square was a smaller space than the current one, located between the ancient parish church of Santa Maria (elevated to cathedral status in 1138) and the early town hall. By 1292, part of the square was occupied by the new town curia. Major urban restructuring occurred from the late 13th to early 14th century, inspired by Siena's Piazza del Campo, with key public buildings facing the square.

In the 14th century, under Siena's control, Grosseto's key representatives lived in the main square, Piazza del Comune. By the 15th century, the square saw new constructions including shops, official residences, and the completion of the bordering area of Piazza del Duomo. A well was added in 1465 but is now lost. In the subsequent centuries, the square deteriorated significantly. The 16th and 17th centuries were particularly harsh, as Grosseto was reduced to a small fort or prison.

Significant urban redevelopment only began in the mid-18th century under the House of Habsburg-Lorraine, focusing on urban renewal. The public square of Grosseto underwent significant changes, as documented in the 1744 reports preserved in the State Archive of Florence. Before the renovation, the square was described as "half broken" and lacking proper paving. Under Colonel Edward Warren's supervision, the square was repaved, and the road layout was redesigned. In 1745, Francesco Anichini detailed the square in his Ecclesiastical History, noting a "loggia of thirty-two arches" forming two major sides of the square, with uniform architecture above. By 1792, the square featured a paved area bordered by columns and chains, and it became commonly known as Piazza delle Catene, although officially it was Piazza Grande, as shown on Gaetano Becherucci's 1823 map.

In 1833, a Gothic-Revival cast iron temple was added to the well in Grosseto's square but was moved to Arcidosso by 1839, where it is known as Fonte del Poggiolo. Due to deteriorating conditions, a new restoration was planned, with proposals from 1836, and the final project approved in 1845 by municipal engineer Morelli. The square was redesigned by Grand Ducal engineer Angiolo Cianferoni, who created a circular pavement with stone posts, chains, and benches. Following Italian unification, the square was renamed Piazza Vittorio Emanuele II. Buildings on the southern and eastern porticoes were raised, and in 1900, the Gothic Revival Palazzo della Provincia replaced the Palazzo Pretorio.

On 7 August 1945, at the proposal of the Italian Republican Party, the City Council named the square after the poet Dante Alighieri. In 1956, Piazza Dante underwent substantial changes: the stone posts, chains, and benches were removed, the paving was replaced, and a parking lot was created in the center of the square, extending radially around the statue of the grand duke. In 2002, the square was restored to its 19th-century appearance, with columns and chains, so today it is once again known as Piazza delle Catene.

== Buildings and monuments ==
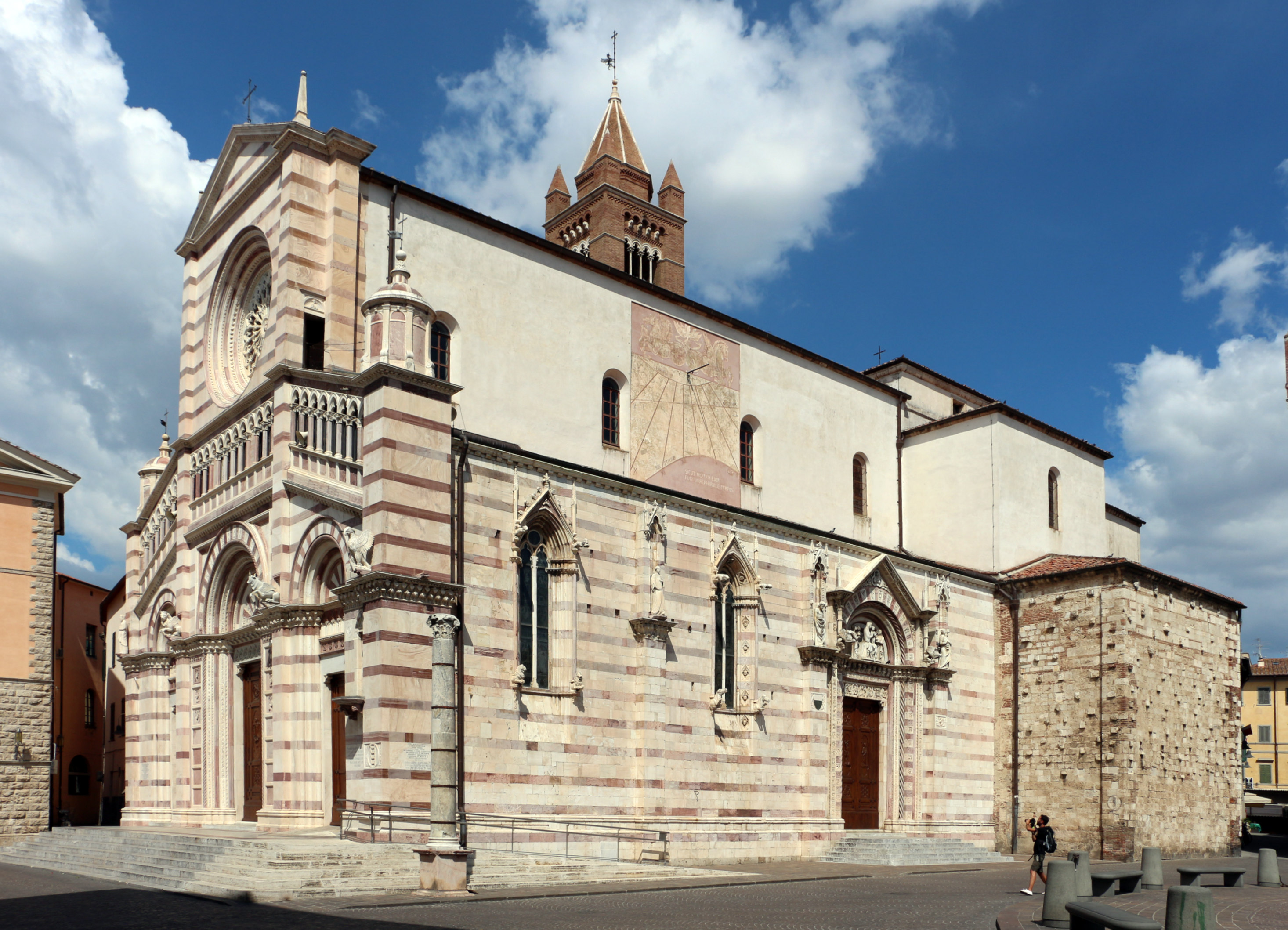
The cathedral

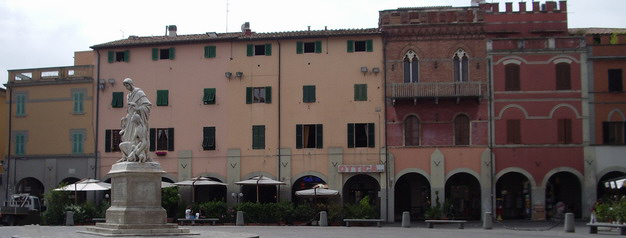
The southern side of the square

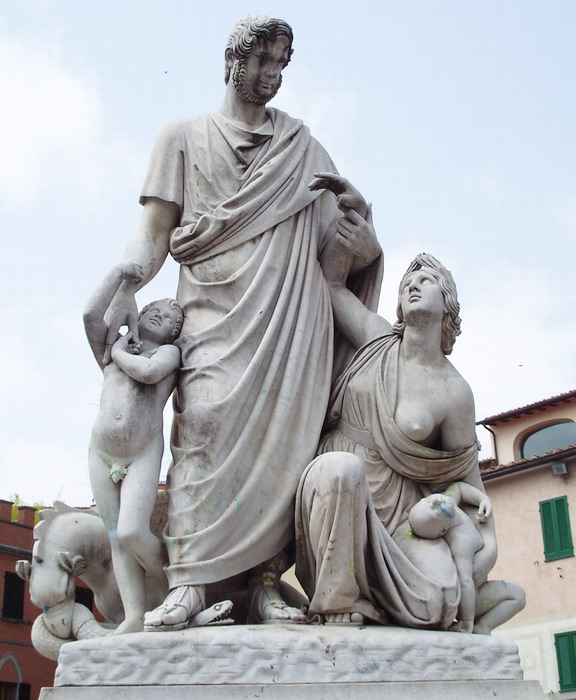
The monument to Canapone

=== Grosseto Cathedral ===
The right side of the Cathedral of St. Lawrence defines the northeastern edge of Piazza Dante, while its façade faces Piazza del Duomo. The church was built in the 13th century on the presumed site of the early medieval Pieve of Santa Maria. The cathedral's current appearance results from mid-19th-century restorations. In 2013, a marble ramp was added on the right side to provide access for individuals with disabilities.

=== Palazzo Aldobrandeschi ===
The Palazzo Aldobrandeschi, commonly known as the Palazzo della Provincia, borders Piazza Dante to the east. Construction began in 1900, following the demolition of the Palazzo Pretorio in the autumn of the previous year. Designed by architect Lorenzo Porciatti, with adjustments made during construction by Guglielmo Calderini, the building is in a Gothic-Revival style reminiscent of Sienese medieval architecture. It was inaugurated on 31 May 1903, and has since served as the seat of the Province of Grosseto.

=== Canapone ===
The statue of Leopold II of Tuscany, known as Canapone, is a white marble monument sculpted by Luigi Magi in 1846 and located at the center of the square. Depicted in the style of an ancient Roman, the Grand Duke supports an allegorical figure of the Maremma holding a dead child—symbolizing the region's past suffering—while extending his other hand toward a joyful boy, representing future generations. Beneath his foot lies a snake, symbolizing malaria, attacked also by a griffin, the emblem of Grosseto. The monument is an allegory of Leopold II's role in the reclamation and regeneration of the Maremma through health and land reforms.

=== Colonna dei Bandi ===
The Colonna dei Bandi (lit. 'Column of notices') is an ancient Roman column located in the northern side of the square, on the right of the cathedral. Its presence in the piazza is attested to 1617, and confirmed in later records until 1832, and was used as the public spot to post municipal notices (bandi). The original column was removed in 1846 with the square's renovation and went lost. The current monument – a 2nd century AD column found in Rusellae in 1863 – was placed on the same site in 1966, during the celebration of the bicentenary of the establishment of the Province of Grosseto.

== Bibliography ==
- Guide d'Italia. Toscana. Milan: Touring Club Italiano. 2012. pp. 882–884.
- Celuzza, Mariagrazia; Papa, Mauro (2013). Grosseto visibile. Guida alla città e alla sua arte pubblica. Arcidosso: Edizioni Effigi. pp. 119–121.
- Innocenti, Mario; Innocenti, Elena (2005). Grosseto: briciole di storia. Cartoline e documenti d'epoca 1899-1944. Grosseto: Editrice Innocenti. pp. 159–177.
- Parisi, Marcella (2001). Grosseto dentro e fuori porta. L'emozione e il pensiero. Arcidosso: C&P Adver Effigi.
