= Villino Pastorelli =

Villa in Grosseto, Italy

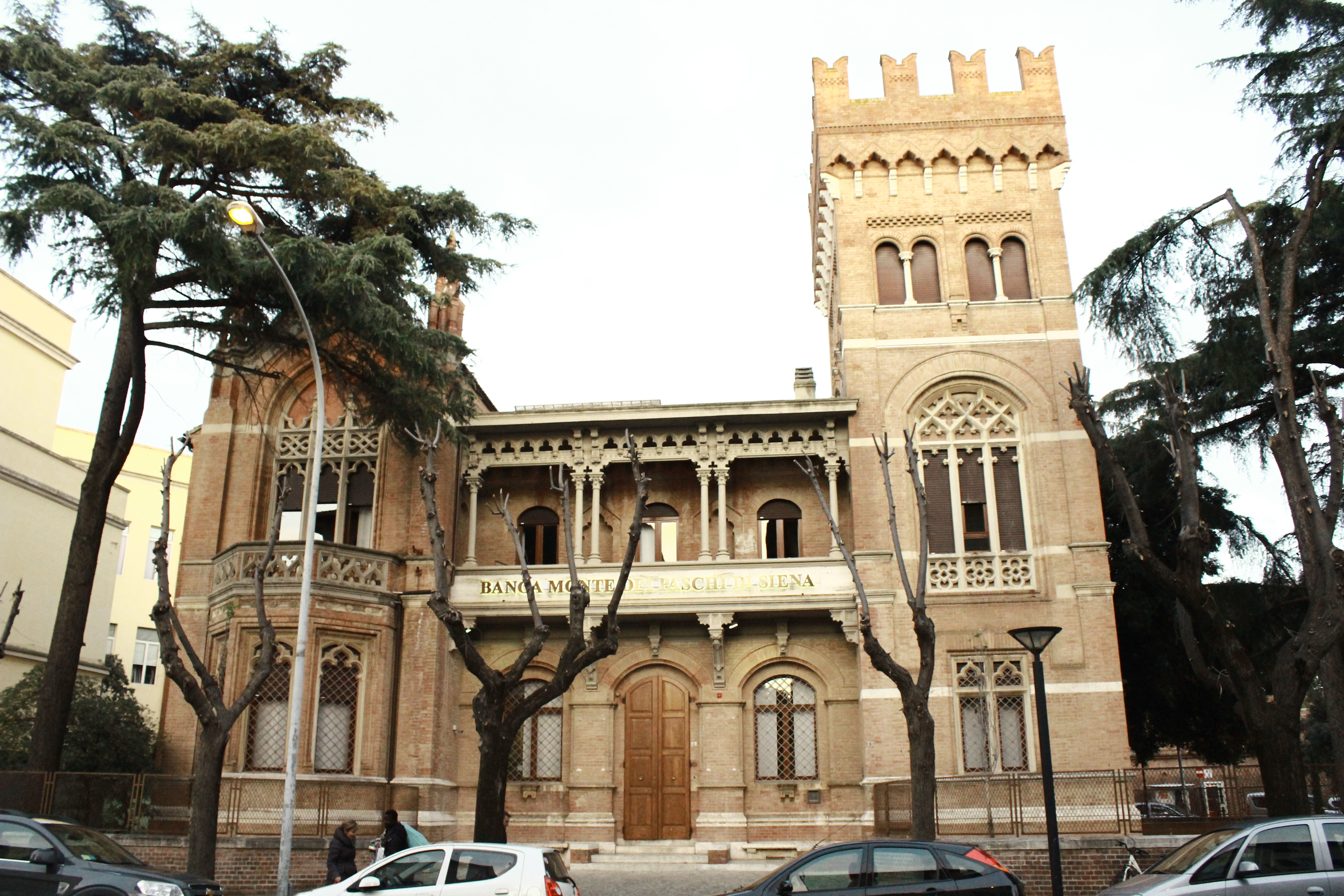
- Interactive map of the Villino Pastorelli area

General information
- Type: Villa
- Architectural style: Gothic Revival
- Location: Via Oriana Fallaci 8 Grosseto, Tuscany
- Coordinates: 42°45′47″N 11°06′46″E
- Construction started: 1908
- Completed: 1913

Design and construction
- Architect: Lorenzo Porciatti

Villino Pastorelli (formerly villino Millanta) is a villa in Grosseto, Italy. It is located along the street which serves as the northern access route into the city walls and is the main connection between Piazza Fratelli Rosselli, in the suburb of Porta Nuova, and the historic center.

== History ==
The building was constructed between 1908 and 1913 by architect Lorenzo Porciatti as the family residence of the wealthy landowner Millanta. The construction material (solid bricks) came from the San Lorenzo kiln near Grosseto, owned by the Porciatti family. The building later changed hands to lawyer Pastorelli, taking on his name. Between 1942 and 1943, it was turned into the Excelsior Hotel by the Marangoni family, with a dance floor set up in the adjacent garden.

In the immediate post-war period, it was acquired by the Banca Nazionale dell'Agricoltura, which made significant modifications between 1948 and 1949, including an extension to the rear. The bank's offices held two unpublished drawings for an additional side extension which was never built and would have taken up part of the garden. The villa housed Banca Monte dei Paschi di Siena until 2013.

Since 2019, it has been the headquarters of the furniture and design company Fidia.

== Description ==
=== Exterior ===
The villa, designed with a multi-volume, undulating layout, is an example of Gothic Revival architecture. Built entirely in brick with decorative stone elements creating a refined two-tone effect, the villa comprises three main parts: the central rectangular block with three ground-floor arches and a first-floor loggia supported by decorative brackets, an angular tower with a square base and battlemented crown and a side wing covered with a gabled roof that is topped by pinnacles that resembles a medieval chapel. This wing features a polygonal bow window with a terrace and a large arched window.

The careful use of brickwork, with radial patterns around openings and serrated inserts, emphasizes the Neo-Medieval style, while Gothic elements are highlighted by the stone detailing in the windows. The lateral facade facing Viale Porciatti includes two smaller, tiered sections — one rectangular and one hexagonal with a projecting turret — that connect to the more subdued rear of the building. The rear facade is simpler, lacking stone details, and includes a series of arched windows, including a prominent one above the main staircase, which has been repurposed for office use.

=== Interior ===
The interior of the villa, originally reflecting its Gothic Revival exterior, has undergone significant changes over the years. Much of the original decoration has been lost, and major structural alterations were made.

The large marble staircase, once the main entrance, has been replaced by a storage area, and a narrow service staircase now connects the floors. The public hall no longer retains its original features or stage. Upper floors have narrow corridors and some original wooden fixtures, though most flooring has been replaced.

Original elements include the attic's red ceramic hexagonal tiles and the side chapel's terrazzo flooring with geometric patterns and a carved wooden portal. The interior still shows an attempt to evoke an Anglo-Saxon Gothic style, evident in the vaulted ceiling and architectural details.

== Critical reception ==
Villino Pastorelli is considered one of the finest works by architect Porciatti, the most significant local figure and the leading representative of eclecticism and later Art Nouveau in the Grosseto area. In the Gothic Revival style adopted for this building, Porciatti seems to reflect influences from artistic experiences abroad. The villa's style has often been described as a "British-inspired Neo-Gothic".

Quattrocchi (2006) describes the villa as a "fairy-tale castle featuring a profusion of Anglo-Gothic elements, also evident in its intricate floor plan, which directly references examples of English 'domestic architecture'".

== Bibliography ==
- Grosseto fuori Porta Nuova. Lo sviluppo di Grosseto a nord delle mura dalla metà dell'Ottocento al secondo dopoguerra. Grosseto: Innocenti Editore. 2009.
- Cappellini, Perla; Dominici, Laura (2004). Le stagioni del liberty in Toscana. Itinerari tra il 1880 e il 1930. Spoleto: Del Gallo Editore.
- Letizia Franchina, ed. (1995). Tra Ottocento e Novecento. Grosseto e la Maremma alla ricerca di una nuova immagine. Soprintendenza per i beni ambientali e architettonici per le province di Siena e Grosseto.
- Innocenti, Mario; Innocenti, Elena (1993). Grosseto:briciole di storia. Cartoline e documenti d'epoca 1899-1944. Grosseto: Innocenti Editore.
- Mariagrazia Celuzza; Mauro Papa, eds. (2013). Grosseto visibile. Guida alla città e alla sua arte pubblica. Arcidosso: Edizioni Effigi.
- Enrico Crispolti; Anna Mazzanti; Luca Quattrocchi, eds. (2005). Arte in Maremma nella prima metà del Novecento. Milano: Silvana Editoriale.
- Maria Adriana Giusti, ed. (1996). Le età del Liberty in Toscana. Florence: Octavo-Franco Cantini Editore.
