= Cosimini Building =

Building in Grosseto, Italy

- Complesso polifunzionale Cosimini
- Interactive map of the Cosimini Building area

General information
- Location: Piazza Fratelli Rosselli / Via Bonghi / Viale Matteotti; Grosseto, Tuscany
- Coordinates: 42°45′49.3″N 11°06′42.11″E
- Construction started: 1970
- Completed: 1978

Design and construction
- Architect: Ludovico Quaroni

The Cosimini Building is a multi-purpose facility—bank, offices, apartments and shops—in Grosseto, Tuscany. It was designed by architect Ludovico Quaroni and completed in 1978. The complex occupies a triangular block bordered by Piazza Fratelli Rosselli, Viale Matteotti, Via Bonghi, and Via Rattazzi, in the suburb of Porta Nuova. Inside, the block features a covered gallery plaza and a courtyard that serves as a roof for the underground parking area.

The building's modernity, both in form and materials, and its bold shapes create a dynamic contrast with the surrounding buildings, such as Mazzoni's Post Office Building and the Government Palace.

== History ==
In the late 1960s, Ludovico Quaroni was commissioned by the Tasselli company to design a new multi-purpose building—combining commercial, office, and residential spaces—for the central Piazza Fratelli Rosselli in Grosseto. This new structure was to replace a neoclassical building that had housed the Cosimini workshops since 1927, designed by Renato Della Rocca.

The design plans were presented to the client in 1970. That same year, work began with the demolition of the old building and the construction of the new multifunctional complex by the Cosimini company of Grosseto. The project was completed in 1978.

== Description ==
The building stands out for its robust plasticity and the use of exposed concrete, elements that reflect an international style and are distinctly different from the surrounding architecture. Its linear and curvilinear volumes, along with the prominent cylindrical towers and spiral staircases, evoke an expressionist search, while the use of exposed concrete and the lack of decorative attributes point to Brutalist influences.

The apex of the site facing Piazza Fratelli Rosselli features a triangular core, while the three sides along Via Bonghi, Viale Matteotti, and Via Rattazzi consist of linear or tower-like sections that integrate with the adjacent buildings and form a triangular internal courtyard. This design is marked by the alternation of straight and curvilinear forms, highlighted by cylindrical stairwells with bold cuts in the masonry and varying urban treatments for different levels. The ground floors (offices and a large store) face the streets and the central gallery, which is covered by a terrace and urban courtyard with spiral concrete staircases. The façade on the square, developed over four floors, features projecting and recessed cylindrical volumes, with glass facades housing bank offices and other facilities. The sides along Via Bonghi and Via Rattazzi, with three and four floors respectively, are characterized by large windowed walls, transitioning to simpler concrete surfaces. Via Rattazzi is covered by an overhanging structure, allowing the section along Via Bonghi to extend beyond the block's boundary, connecting with the adjacent building's façade. The complex also includes a five-story office building on Viale Matteotti, with a linear façade predominantly of concrete, and a cylindrical chimney-pillar that marks the entrance to the elevated gallery.

== Critical reception ==
Critics have offered varied and detailed evaluations of the building. Terranova and Ciorra highlight the urban scale of the project and the theme of the multifunctional building, which was very relevant in the 1960s architectural culture. Terranova (1985) notes that Quaroni chose to emphasize the urban dimension of the building, creating a strong compositional tension between the circular square and the surrounding streets. However, this compositional principle was undermined by the underutilization of the building's functions and the lack of integration between residential and commercial spaces, weakening the "urban" character of the square. Ciorra (1989) agrees, stating that the building and other multifunctional projects by Quaroni during that time were directly influenced by town-design principles. The concept of a "building city" aimed to consolidate and organize various urban functions.

Polano and Muratore criticize the realization of the project. Muratore (1992) sees it as a missed opportunity due to poor execution and management, while Polano (1991) points out the complexity and incomplete nature of the project, which is dominated by an unintended sense of "monumentality". Quaroni himself acknowledged that while the reinforced concrete aspects were well executed, the final finishes, particularly in the ground-floor gallery, were neglected.

In the years following its completion, the building faced intense debate and criticism, with its large scale being poorly received by some of the local population. The disconnect between the innovative design and its implementation is attributed not only to the unsatisfactory construction and natural deterioration of the exposed concrete but also to the failure of certain urban and social premises of the 1960s, which significantly weakened the project. Specifically, the gallery and elevated terrace, which were intended to provide access to shops, are largely unused, serving only the offices.

== Sources ==
- Grosseto fuori Porta Nuova. Lo sviluppo di Grosseto a nord delle mura dalla metà dell'Ottocento al secondo dopoguerra. Grosseto: Innocenti Editore. 2009.
- Catalani, Barbara; Del Francia, Marco; Tombari, Giovanni (2011). Itinerari di architettura contemporanea. Grosseto e provincia. Pisa: ETS.
- Mariagrazia Celuzza; Mauro Papa, eds. (2013). Grosseto visibile. Guida alla città e alla sua arte pubblica. Arcidosso: Edizioni Effigi.
- Ciorra, Pippo (1989). Ludovico Quaroni (1911-1987). Opere e progetti. Milan: Electa.
- Giorgio Muratore, ed. (1992). Guida all'architettura moderna. Italia. Gli ultimi trent'anni. Bologna: Zanichelli.
- G. Nannerini (1979). "Il polifunzionale di Quaroni a Grosseto". L'Industria delle Costruzioni (88): 14–24.
- Polano, Sergio (1991). Guida all'architettura italiana del Novecento. Milan: Electa.
- Antonino Terranova, ed. (1985). Ludovico Quaroni. Architetture per 50 anni. Rome: Gangemi.
