= Sozzo Rustichini =

Italian architect

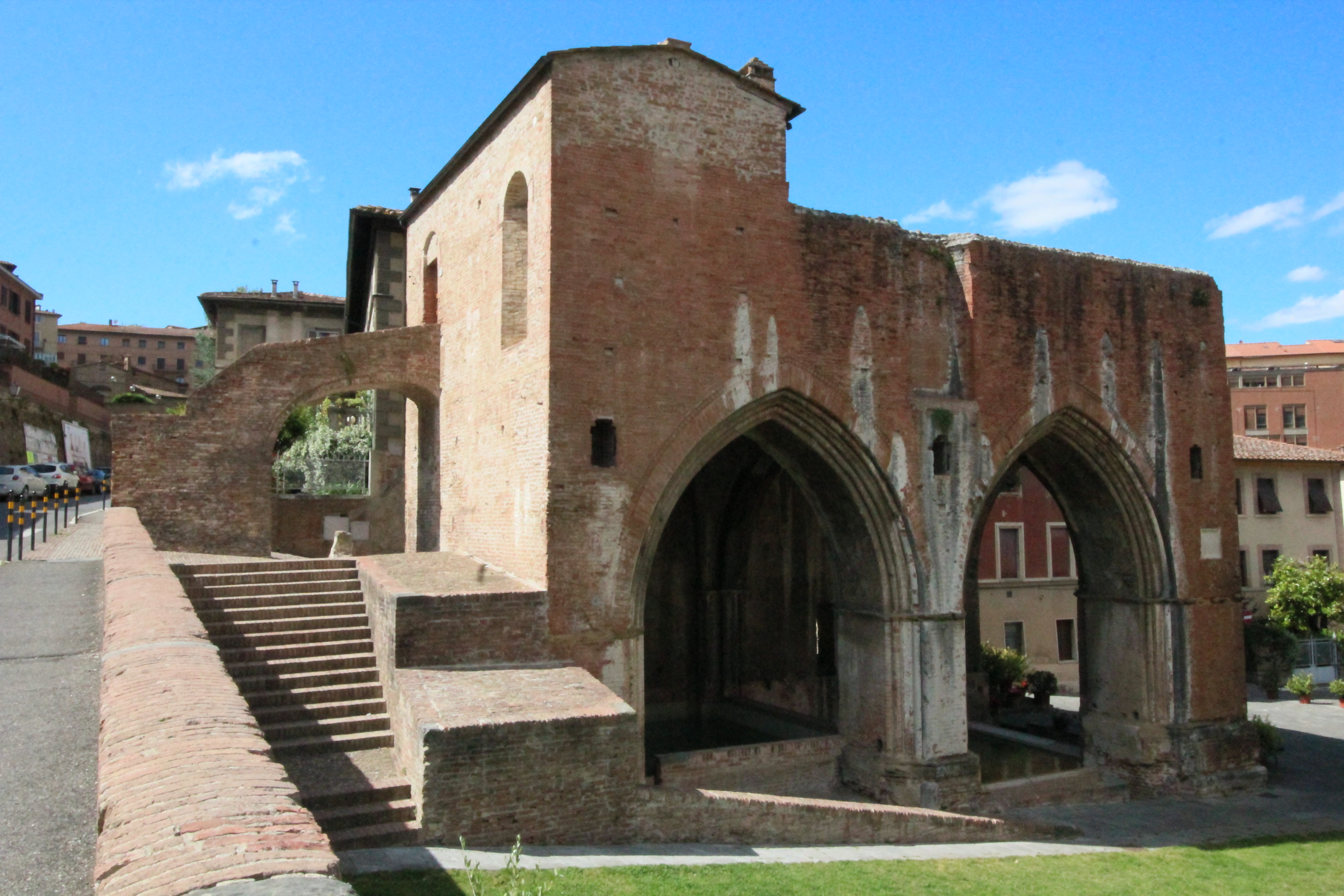
Fonte Nuova in Siena

Sozzo Rustichini or Sozzo di Rustichino was an Italian architect from Siena, active between the end of the 13th century and the beginning of the 14th century.

== Life and career ==
Sozzo was a Sienese architect particularly active in the second half of the 13th century, and he is mainly remembered for being the first master of the construction site of the Grosseto Cathedral, as noted in an inscription that records the construction work of the cathedral between 1294 and 1302.

In 1295, he was part of a commission for the construction in Siena of the Fonte Nuova in Pian d'Ovile, whose members were "magistri lapidum" and "magistri Operis", including Duccio di Boninsegna and Giovanni Pisano. The work on the fountain was carried out by Sozzo himself along with Camaino di Crescentino in 1298.

According to Middeldorf Kosegarten (1984), these same masters, including Sozzo, may have been the authors of some sculptures on the upper part of the facade of the Siena Cathedral, which was interrupted after the departure of Giovanni Pisano and completed by Camaino di Crescentino.

Sozzo's lastname is present in the genealogy tree of Piccolomini family, on the branch with number 46 and under the name of 'di Rustichino' (1685). The name 'Rustichini' and 'di Rustichino' hold the same meaning, as the first one is declined grammatically as a patronymic genitive, and literally means 'of Rustichino'. For this reason, in old manuscripts and in the 'Caleffo Vecchio' archives both 'Rustichini' and 'di Rustichino' are used indifferently. Cit. 'Fondo Diplomatico Repubblica di Siena'.

== Sources ==
- Fabio Bargagli Petrucci (1906). Le fonti di Siena e i loro acquedotti. Siena.
- Antje Middeldorf Kosegarten (1984). Sienesische Bildhauer am Duomo Vecchio. Studien zur Skulptur in Siena 1250-1330. Munich: Bruckmann.
- Marcella Parisi (1996). "Maestri di pietra nella Cattedrale di San Lorenzo". In Cristina Gnoni Maravelli; Laura Martini (eds.). La cattedrale di San Lorenzo a Grosseto. Arte e storia dal XIII al XIX secolo. Milan: Silvana Editoriale.
