= Lorenzo Porciatti =

Italian architect (1864–1928)

- Born: 3 September 1864; Cana, Province of Grosseto, Kingdom of Italy
- Died: 17 March 1928 (aged 63); Grosseto, Kingdom of Italy
- Occupation: Architect

Lorenzo Porciatti (3 September 1864 – 17 March 1928) was an Italian architect and architectural restorer, active mainly in his native Tuscany.

== Biography ==
He was born in Cana, and died in Grosseto. He obtained a diploma from the Academy of Fine Arts in Florence, then went to University of Rome to study mathematics, but left after a year. He became self-taught as an architect. He won an award for his design of the altar to Pope Leo XIII. He designed the tomb of Major Daniel Peploe at Weobley, Herefordshire, the Paoletti Perini chapel at the cemetery of Trespiano, and the Salle chapel at San Miniato al Monte, including its painting and sculpture.

He presented a project, presented at the 1887 Exposition of Venice for the restoration and completion of the nave, as well of construction of a pulpit, of the Cathedral of Grosseto. He also designed two monuments to Donatello.

For the town of Montieri, on the ruins of the older courthouse, Porciatti designed a Gothic Revival Palazzo Comunale (1901) and the elementary school. He also designed the Neo-Gothic Palazzo Aldobrandeschi and Villino Pastorelli, and the Art Nouveau style Villino Panichi in Grosseto. He also restored the castle and the church of San Giovanni Battista in Castiglione della Pescaia and designed the Vivarelli Mausoleum in Talamone's cemetery.

== Works (selection) ==
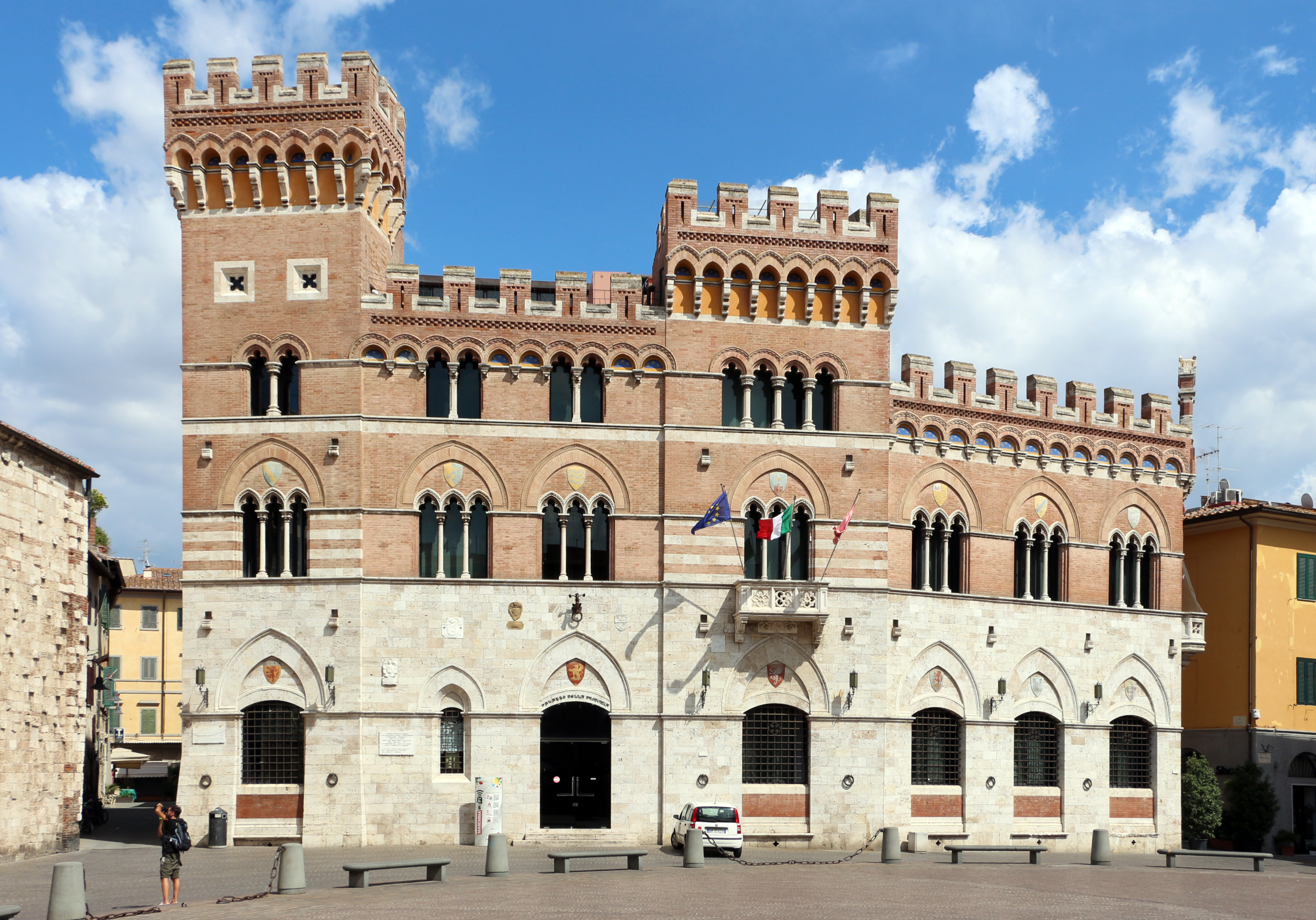
Palazzo Aldobrandeschi

- Villino Panichi, Grosseto (1900)
- Palazzo Aldobrandeschi, Grosseto (1900–1903)
- Palazzo Comunale, Montieri (1901)
- Chapel of Merope Becchini, San Lorenzo, Arcidosso (1902)
- Vivarelli Mausoleum, Talamone (1906)
- San Lorenzo Farmhouse, Grosseto (1907–1911)
- Villino Pastorelli, Grosseto (1913)
- Palazzo Tripoli, Grosseto (1915)
- World War I Memorial, Castiglione della Pescaia (1923)
- World War I Memorial, Follonica (1925)

== Sources ==
- De Gubernatis, Angelo (1889). Dizionario degli artisti italiani viventi: pittori, scultori, e architetti. Le Monnier.
- Letizia Franchina, ed. (1995). Tra Ottocento e Novecento. Grosseto e la Maremma alla ricerca di una nuova immagine. Soprintendenza per i beni ambientali e architettonici per le province di Siena e Grosseto.
- Innocenti, Mario; Innocenti, Elena (1993). Grosseto:briciole di storia. Cartoline e documenti d'epoca 1899-1944. Grosseto: Innocenti Editore.
- Mariagrazia Celuzza; Mauro Papa, eds. (2013). Grosseto visibile. Guida alla città e alla sua arte pubblica. Arcidosso: Edizioni Effigi.
- Enrico Crispolti; Anna Mazzanti; Luca Quattrocchi, eds. (2005). Arte in Maremma nella prima metà del Novecento. Milano: Silvana Editoriale.
- Maria Adriana Giusti, ed. (1996). Le età del Liberty in Toscana. Florence: Octavo-Franco Cantini Editore.
