= Piazza della Vasca =

Public square in Grosseto, Italy

Piazza Fratelli Rosselli
- Piazza della Vasca

- Location within Tuscany
- Former name: Piazza Umberto I
- Namesake: Carlo and Nello Rosselli
- Location: Grosseto, Tuscany, Italy
- Coordinates: 42°45′49″N 11°06′44″E

Construction
- Completed: 1871

Piazza Fratelli Rosselli, better known as Piazza della Vasca (lit. 'Basin's Square'), is a public square in Grosseto, Tuscany, Italy.

Located outside the Medicean walls in the immediate area beyond Porta Nuova, the square is officially dedicated to the brothers Carlo and Nello Rosselli but is commonly referred to as "della Vasca" ("of the Basin") due to the semicircular fountain at its center, which effectively serves as a traffic roundabout. The circular square is surrounded by monumental architectural complexes, such as the Palazzo del Governo, the Palazzo delle Poste, and the Cosimini multipurpose building.

Five roads converge and depart from the square, connecting the city center with various parts of Grosseto.

== History ==
The first plan for developing this area outside Porta Nuova's northern walls dates back to 1830, but an actual plan was undertaken starting in 1869, resulting in the creation of a landscaped square in 1871. The Cosimini industrial workshops appeared nearby in 1874, and in 1896 a monument to the fallen of Italy's unification wars was erected. The square was named after the King Umberto I.

At the beginning of the 20th century, elegant residences like Villino Panichi (1900) and Villino Volpi (1909) were built. The square took shape in the 1920s with the Regia Scuola Normale Magistrale (1923), the Palazzo del Governo (1927), the Palazzo Cosimini (1927), and Villa Barth (1928). A circular fountain replaced the fallen soldiers' monument in 1930. In 1932, the Liberty style Villa Barth was replaced by Angiolo Mazzoni's Post Office Building.

After World War II, in 1945, the square was named after the anti-fascist brothers Carlo and Nello Rosselli. The square saw changes like the removal of Villino Panichi's staircase for commercial buildings. In 1970, Palazzo Cosimini was replaced by a modern concrete multipurpose building by Ludovico Quaroni, breaking with the square's original style.

== Buildings ==
- Cosimini Building
- "Giovanni Pascoli" Middle School (former Royal Normal School)
- Palazzo del Governo
- Palazzo delle Poste
- Villino Panichi
- Villino Volpi

== Sources ==
- Grosseto fuori Porta Nuova. Lo sviluppo di Grosseto a nord delle mura dalla metà dell'Ottocento al secondo dopoguerra. Grosseto: Innocenti Editore. 2009.
- Mariagrazia Celuzza; Mauro Papa, eds. (2013). Grosseto visibile. Guida alla città e alla sua arte pubblica. Arcidosso: Edizioni Effigi.
- Maddalena Corti, ed. (1995). Grosseto post-unitaria. Grosseto: Archivio di Stato di Grosseto.
- Enrico Crispolti; Anna Mazzanti; Luca Quattrocchi, eds. (2006). Arte in Maremma nella prima metà del Novecento. Milano: Silvana Editoriale.
- Innocenti, Mario; Innocenti, Elena (2005). Grosseto: briciole di storia. Cartoline e documenti d'epoca 1899-1944. Grosseto: Innocenti Editore.
- Mazzini, Vanessa (1996). Immagine e arredo urbano a Grosseto. L'asse della città da Piazza Fratelli Rosselli a Piazza De Maria. Grosseto: I Portici.
