= Grand Hotel Bastiani =

Hotel in Grosseto, Italy

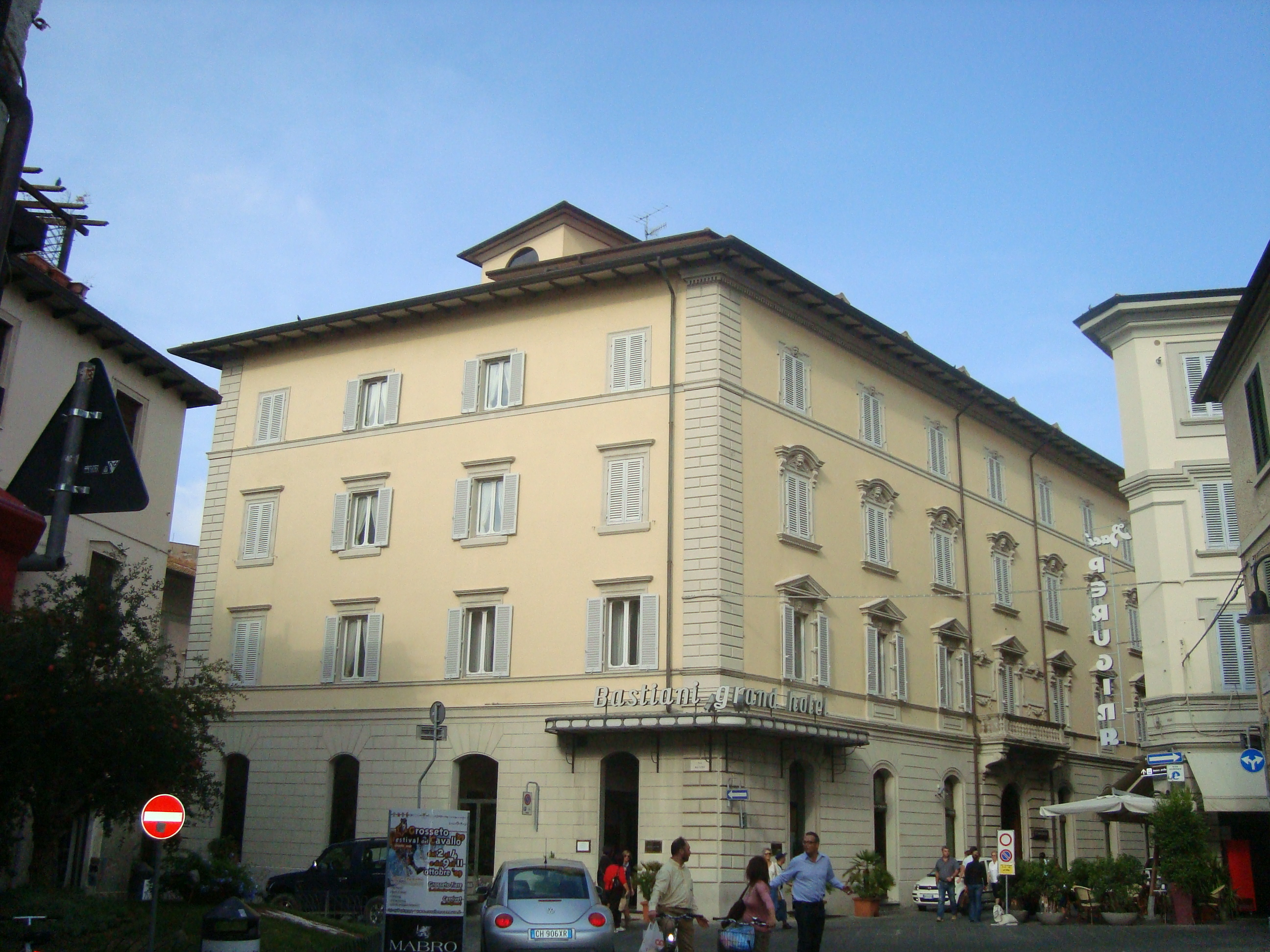
- Interactive map of the Grand Hotel Bastiani area

General information
- Location: Piazza Gioberti / Via Manin / Via Mazzini; Grosseto, Tuscany
- Coordinates: 42°45′35.63″N 11°06′45.3″E
- Construction started: 1910
- Completed: 1912
- Opened: May 1912; 114 years ago

Design and construction
- Architect: Vittorio Mariani

The Grand Hotel Bastiani is a hotel in the Piazza Gioberti of Grosseto, Tuscany, bordered by Via Daniele Manin and Via Giuseppe Mazzini, not far from the Piazza del Duomo. It was designed by architect Vittorio Mariani and opened in 1912.

== History ==
The hotel was founded by Alfredo and Anita Bastiani as the city's main accommodation establishment, located along Via Manin, which led directly to the main square opposite the cathedral. It was constructed between 1910 and 1912, designed by architect Vittorio Mariani, with work carried out by the Ginanneschi and Anatrini company and overseen by project manager Efisio Bellucci. Also featuring a restaurant and a ballroom, it was inaugurated in May 1912.

In 1927, the hotel was expanded on the Via Fabio Filzi side, based on a design by Roman engineer Ferruccio Viviani.

Becoming the Grand Hotel of Grosseto, a meeting place for the city's upper bourgeoisie, it faced significant decline during the 1970s, leading to a temporary closure. It was later renovated and reopened on 27 July 1987, with reduced space, no restaurant and partially sold to a bank.

After a period of closure from March 2020 due to COVID-19 pandemic, the hotel was purchased by the Mencarelli family and reopened in July 2024.

== Description ==
The Grand Hotel Bastiani is a four-floors building in a Renaissance Revival style. The main facade is at the corner facing Via Manin, while the left side facade is on Via Mazzini, at the corner of Piazza Gioberti within the Porta Corsica area; both facades have access doors to the building.

The ground floor of both facades is distinguished by large windows and entrance portals, which are designed with a lowered arch. The central entrance portal along the Via Manin facade is topped by a balcony supported by two projecting side brackets, while the portal located on the left side of this facade and the one along the Via Mazzini facade are covered by a corner canopy, where the hotel's signage is displayed. The ground floor walling is entirely covered in rusticated stonework.

The upper floors of the building feature exterior walls covered in plaster, except for the squared stone blocks that decorate the corners between the facades. There are continuous stringcourses, with a double one separating the ground floor from the floor above, and a single one separating the two uppermost levels. The facade facing Via Mazzini has rectangular, lintelled windows with shutter openings on all three upper levels, a type of window also found on the Via Manin facade. On this latter facade, the windows on the top floor retain the same stylistic elements as those on the other facade, while on the first and second floors, the lintels of each window are topped respectively by a characteristic triangular pediment and a semicircular cornice, resting on two vertical brackets that, in turn, are supported by the lateral ends of each lintel. Each niche between the lintel and the architectural element above contains a small animal head sculpture.

The roof is a slightly pitched four-sided structure, beyond which a small square tower rises on the Via Mazzini side, with an axis not parallel to the facades.

== Sources ==
- Camera di Commercio di Grosseto, ed. (1988). Annuario della Maremma. Siena: Il Cavaliere d'Italia.
- Mariagrazia Celuzza; Mauro Papa, eds. (2013). Grosseto visibile. Guida alla città e alla sua arte pubblica. Arcidosso: Edizioni Effigi.
- Enrico Crispolti; Anna Mazzanti; Luca Quattrocchi, eds. (2006). Arte in Maremma nella prima metà del Novecento. Milano: Silvana Editoriale.
- Innocenti, Elena; Innocenti, Mario (2005). Grosseto: briciole di storia. Cartoline e documenti d'epoca 1899-1944. Grosseto: Innocenti Editore.
- Parisi, Marcella (2001). Grosseto dentro e fuori porta. L'emozione e il pensiero. Siena: C&P Adver Effigi.
