= Vittorio Mariani =

Italian architect

- Born: 29 September 1859; Siena, Grand Duchy of Tuscany
- Died: 15 March 1946 (aged 86); Siena, Italy
- Education: Accademia di Belle Arti di Roma
- Occupations: Architect; Architectural restorer

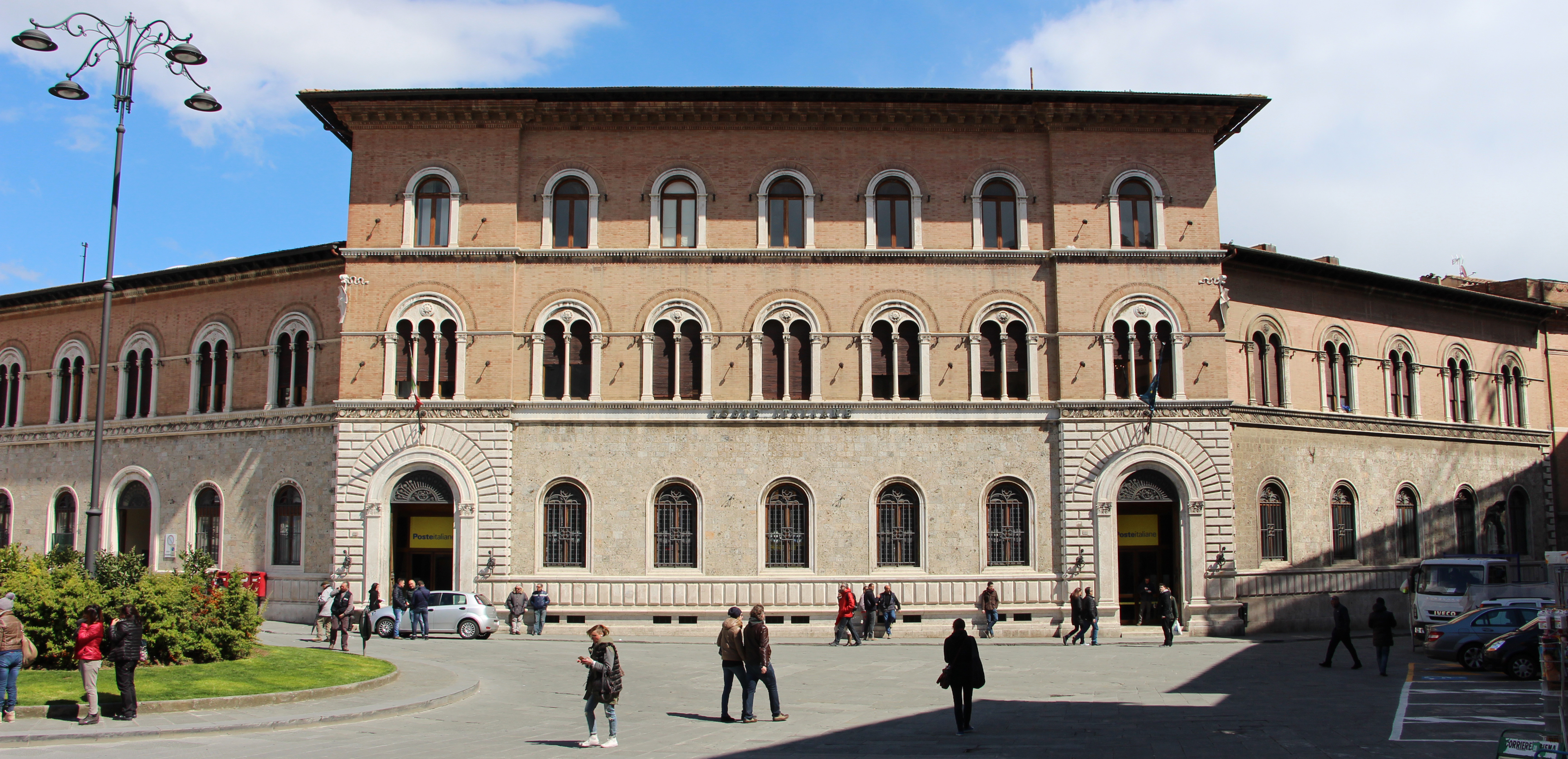
Siena Post Office

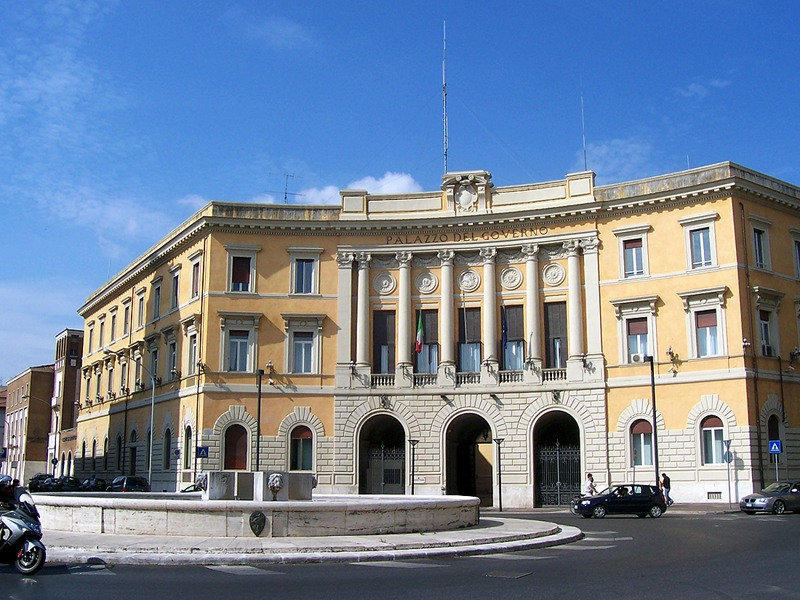
Government Palace in Grosseto

Vittorio Mariani (29 September 1859 – 15 March 1946) was an Italian architect, active mainly in his native Tuscany.

== Biography ==
Born in Siena, Mariani graduated in architecture at the Accademia di Belle Arti di Roma, where he was a pupil of Giuseppe Partini.

He designed numerous buildings in his native Siena, and contributed to the restoration and renovation of ancient palaces and churches in the old town, including the Rozzi Theatre (1894), San Mamiliano in Valli (1896), the Basilica of San Francesco (1903), Santa Maria della Scala (1905–09), Palazzo Salimbeni (1911–16) and the expansion of the San Niccolò Psychiatric Hospital (1914).

In Grosseto, Mariani designed the Bastiani Grand Hotel (1910–12), the local headquarters of Monte dei Paschi (1912) and the Government Palace (1923–27). He also designed the Post Office Palaces in Siena (1908–12) and in Messina, Sicily (1912–14). He designed the city master plan of Siena in 1931.

== Bibliography ==
- Elisabetta Insabato; Cecilia Ghelli, eds. (2007). Guida agli archivi di architetti e ingegneri del Novecento in Toscana. Florence: Edifir.
- Enrico Crispolti; Anna Mazzanti; Luca Quattrocchi, eds. (2005). Arte in Maremma nella prima metà del Novecento. Milan: Silvana Editoriale.
- Rovida, Maria Antonietta; Vigni, Laura (2010). Vittorio Mariani architetto e urbanista (1859-1946). Cultura urbana e architettonica fra Siena e l'Europa. Florence: Polistampa.
