= Villino Panichi =

Villa in Grosseto, Italy

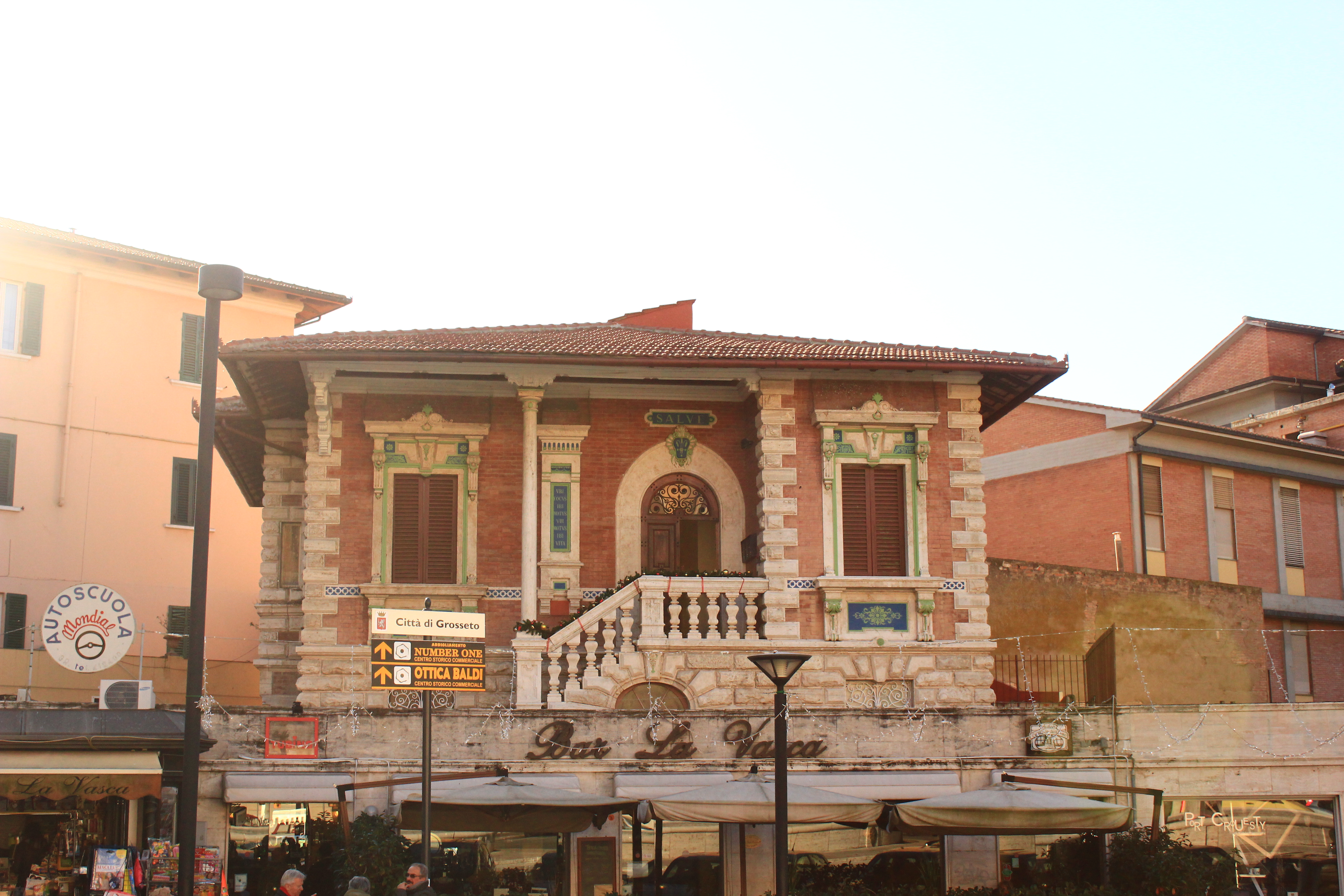
- Interactive map of the Villino Panichi area

General information
- Type: Villa
- Architectural style: Art Nouveau; Renaissance Revival
- Location: Piazza Fratelli Rosselli / Via Oriana Fallaci; Grosseto, Tuscany
- Coordinates: 42°45′48.06″N 11°06′43.8″E
- Completed: 1900

Technical details
- Floor count: 2

Design and construction
- Architect: Lorenzo Porciatti

Villino Panichi is a Liberty-style villa in Grosseto, Italy. It is located on the corner between Piazza Fratelli Rosselli and Via Oriana Fallaci, just outside the historic center in the suburb of Porta Nuova.

== History ==
Built in 1900 by architect Lorenzo Porciatti, this was the first building constructed in Piazza della Vasca (then Piazza Umberto I) during the renovation of Via IV Novembre (later Via Fallaci). Named after the family who originally lived there, the villa was initially separated from the square by a decorative iron gate and wall, both of which were demolished after World War II. A low building, now housing commercial activities, was erected in their place, its convex shape echoing the perimeter of the square.

== Description ==
The villa is a two-story building with brick masonry and stone decorations. The structure is preceded by a low, convex building on the square's side, which houses a bar. The ground floor of the villa features a prominent central entrance portal with a round arch, flanked by rectangular windows on each side.

The raised floor also has a central entrance portal with a round arch, reached by a distinctive staircase with a circular column supporting the four-pitched roof. Each side of the portal has a rectangular window with a top lintel supported by two side columns, which in turn rest on another lintel at the base of each window. The villa is also notable for its fine wrought iron work.

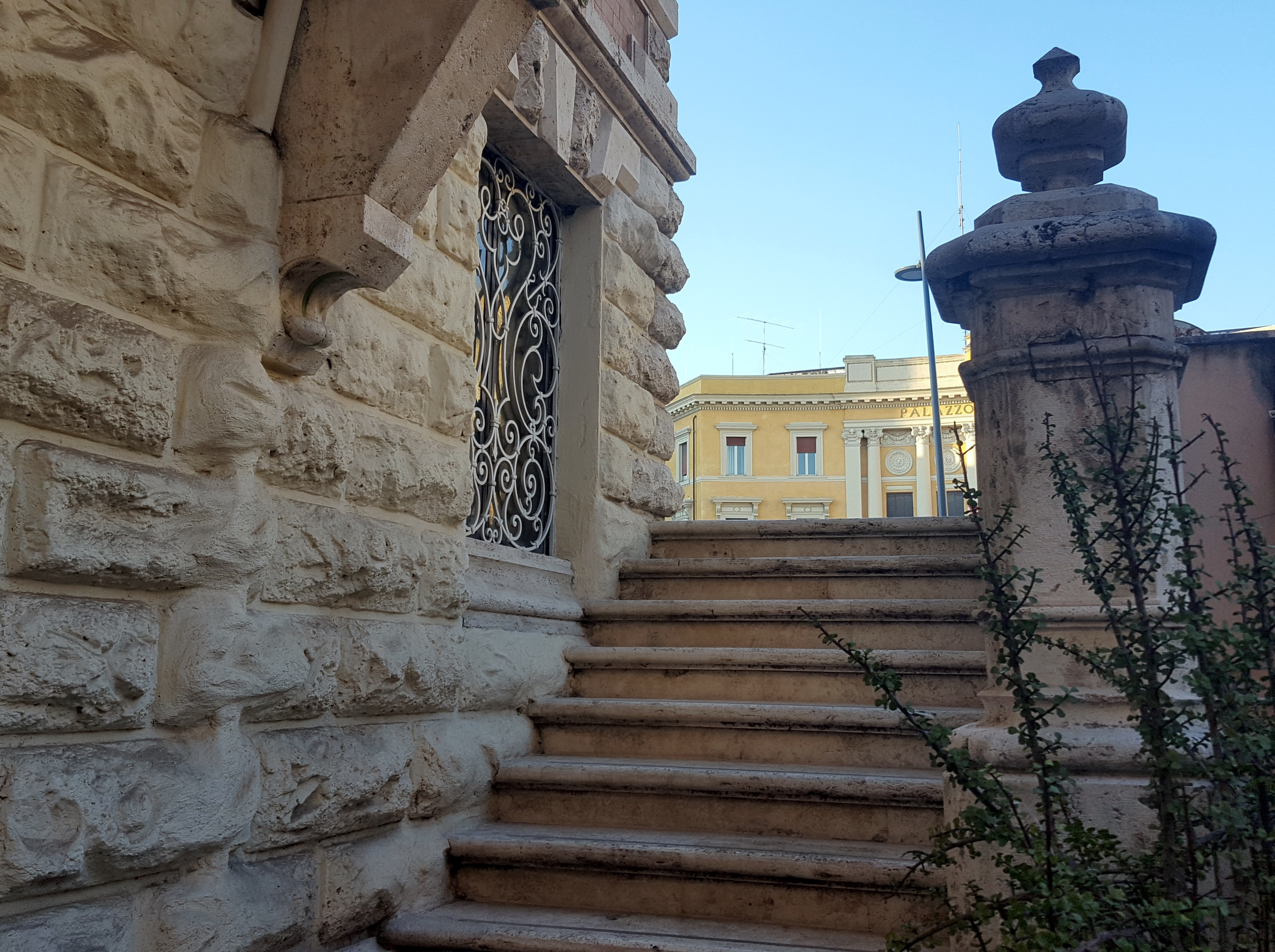
Detail of the entrance staircase

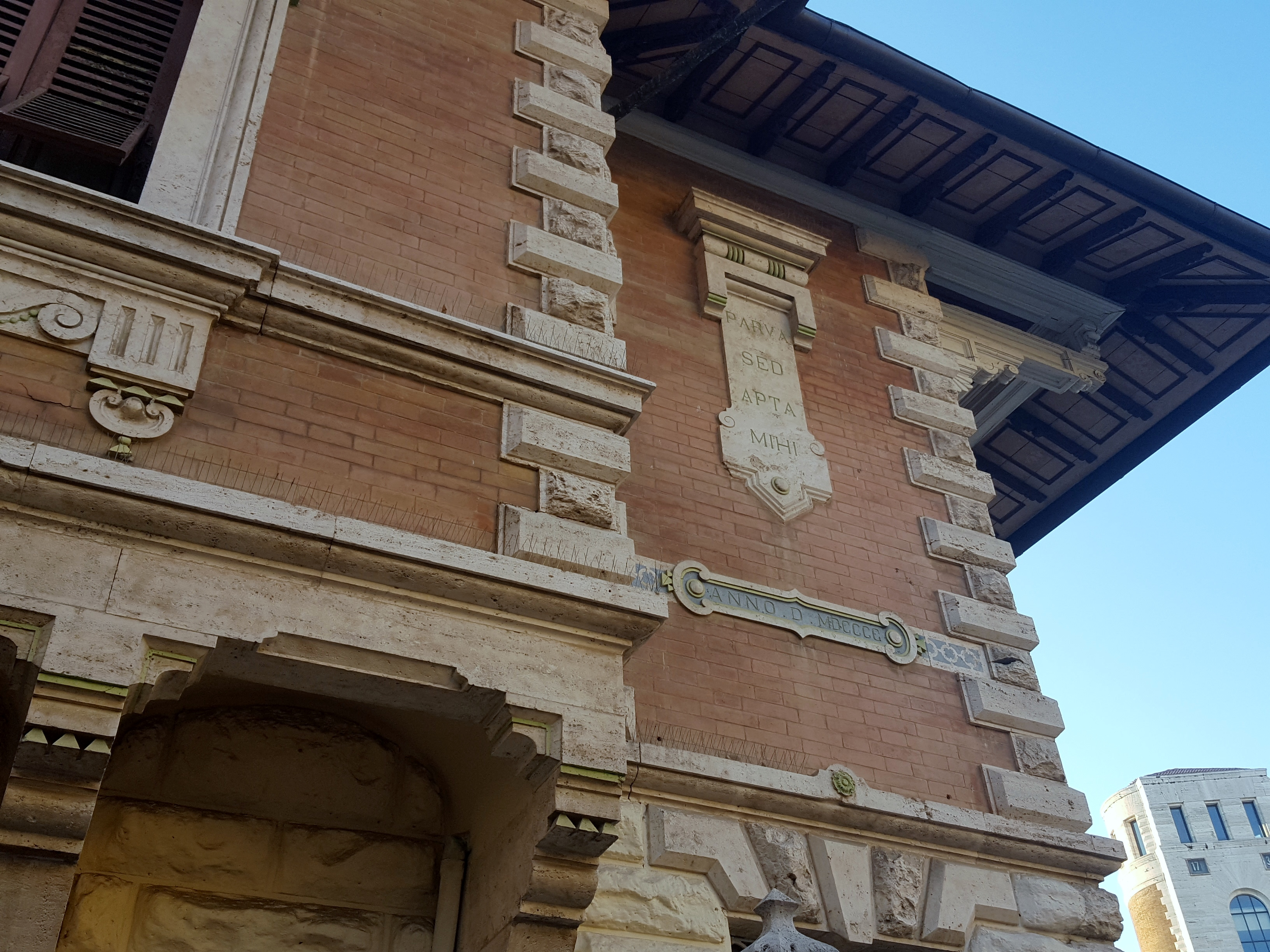
Detail of the facade on Via Fallaci

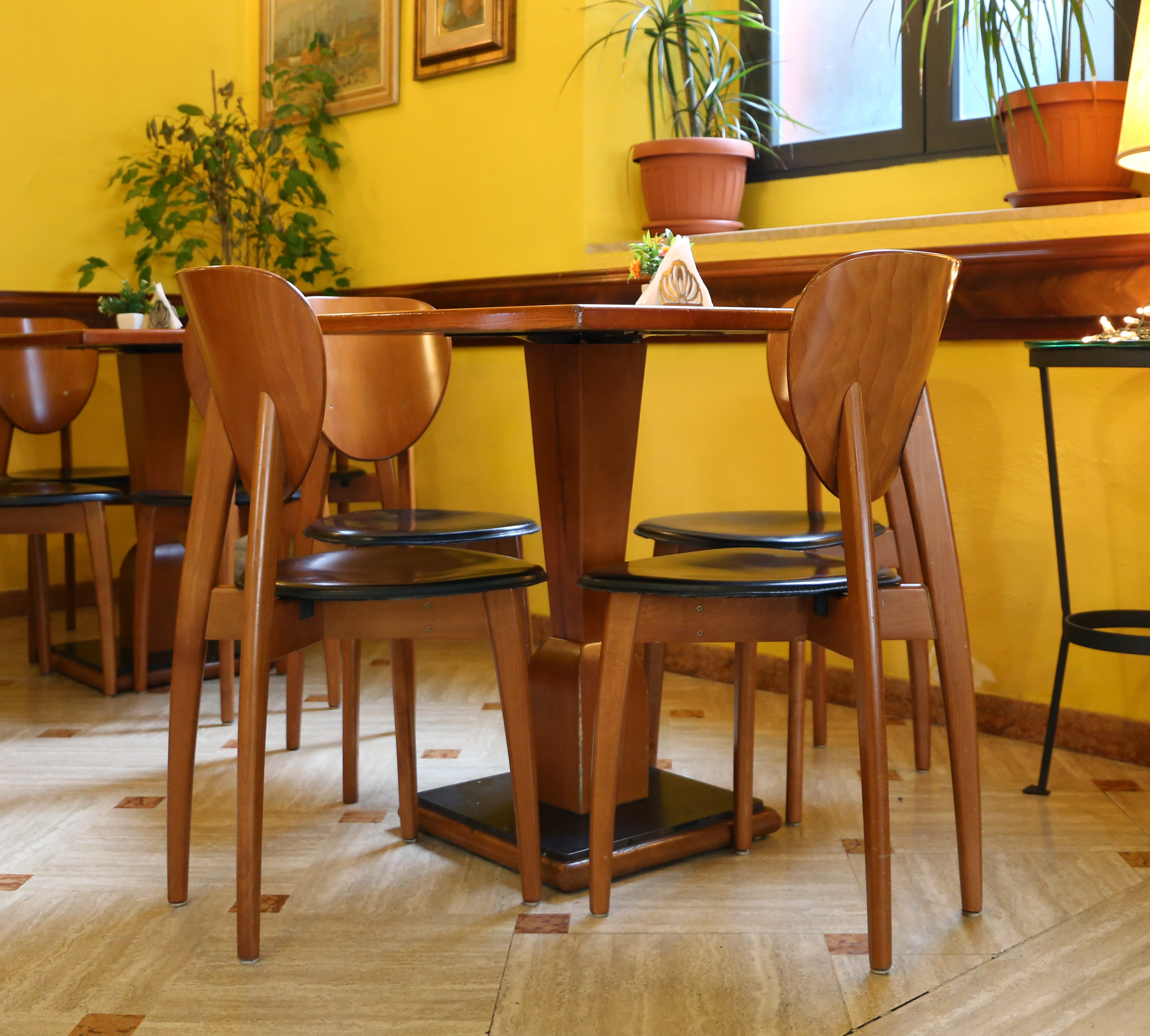
Original 1930s interior furnishings

== Critical reception ==
The villa exhibits Renaissance Revival elements that harmonize well with the Art Nouveau decorations and ornaments.

According to Barbato and Mangani (2013), "the building is distinguished by its Liberty decorative elements, making it one of the city's earliest examples of this style. The use of stone and iron decorations, the balustrade with columns on the access staircase, the door and window frames, the wrought iron work, and the portal rosette all contribute to a characteristic design that reflects the distinctive creativity of Lorenzo Porciatti's work". Quattrocchi (2006) notes that the architect "combines a predominantly neocinquecentist layout with some Liberty decorative details in the now-vanished Rococo fence".

== Bibliography ==
- Grosseto fuori Porta Nuova. Lo sviluppo di Grosseto a nord delle mura dalla metà dell'Ottocento al secondo dopoguerra. Grosseto: Innocenti Editore. 2009.
- Cappellini, Perla; Dominici, Laura (2004). Le stagioni del liberty in Toscana. Itinerari tra il 1880 e il 1930. Spoleto: Del Gallo Editore.
- Letizia Franchina, ed. (1995). Tra Ottocento e Novecento. Grosseto e la Maremma alla ricerca di una nuova immagine. Soprintendenza per i beni ambientali e architettonici per le province di Siena e Grosseto.
- Innocenti, Mario; Innocenti, Elena (1993). Grosseto:briciole di storia. Cartoline e documenti d'epoca 1899-1944. Grosseto: Innocenti Editore.
- Mariagrazia Celuzza; Mauro Papa, eds. (2013). Grosseto visibile. Guida alla città e alla sua arte pubblica. Arcidosso: Edizioni Effigi.
- Enrico Crispolti; Anna Mazzanti; Luca Quattrocchi, eds. (2005). Arte in Maremma nella prima metà del Novecento. Milano: Silvana Editoriale.
- Maria Adriana Giusti, ed. (1996). Le età del Liberty in Toscana. Florence: Octavo-Franco Cantini Editore.
