= Piazza del Duomo, Grosseto =

Public square in Grosseto, Italy

Piazza del Duomo
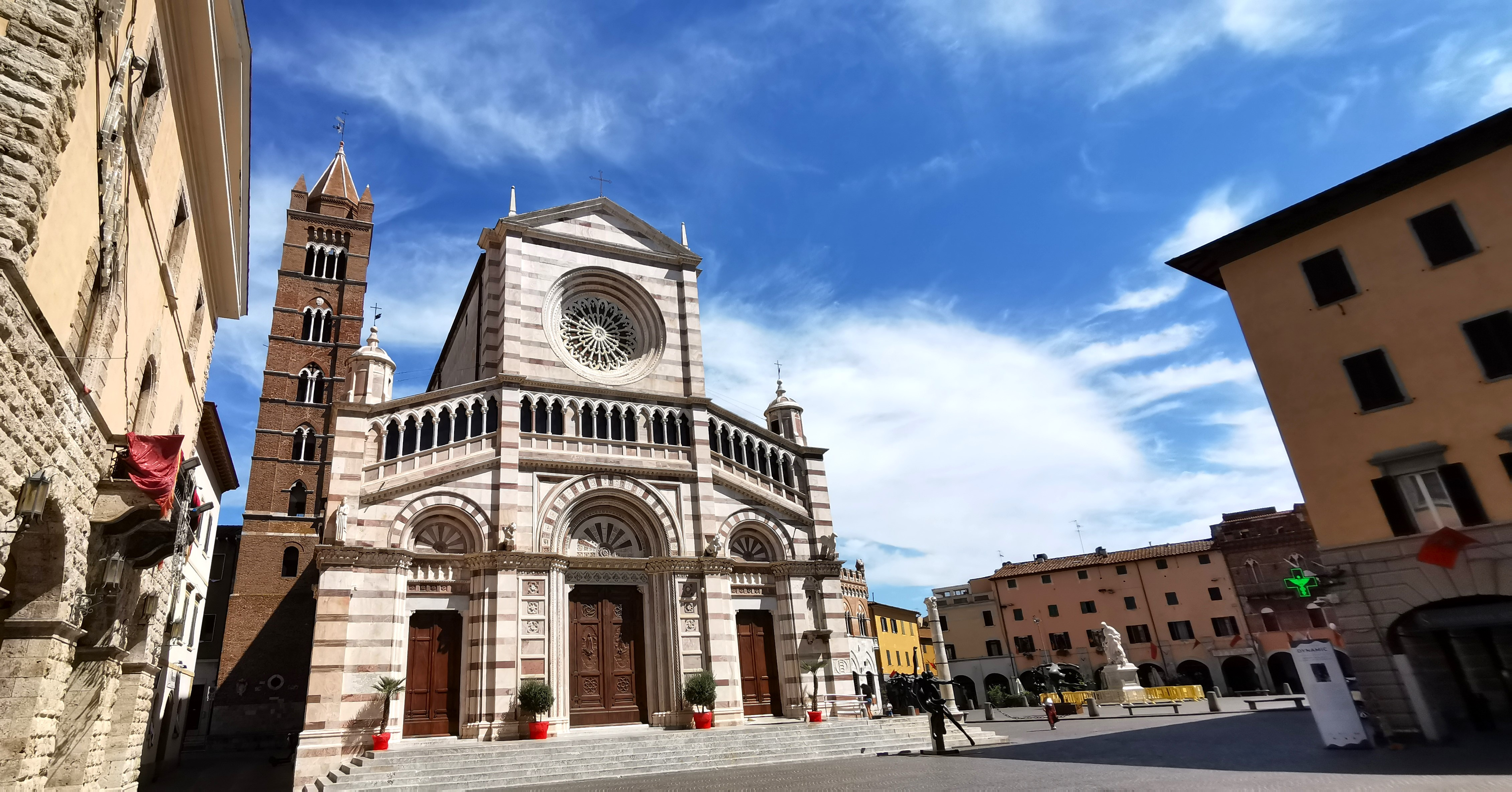

- Location within Tuscany
- Namesake: Grosseto Cathedral
- Location: Grosseto, Tuscany, Italy
- Coordinates: 42°45′36″N 11°06′49″E

Other
- Status: pedestrianised

Piazza del Duomo (lit. 'Cathedral's Square') is a square located in the historic center of Grosseto, home to some of the city's most significant buildings.

The square is named after the Grosseto Cathedral, which overlooks it, and it is adjacent to the larger Piazza Dante. On its northern side, the square connects to Corso Carducci, the main thoroughfare of the historic centre.

== History ==
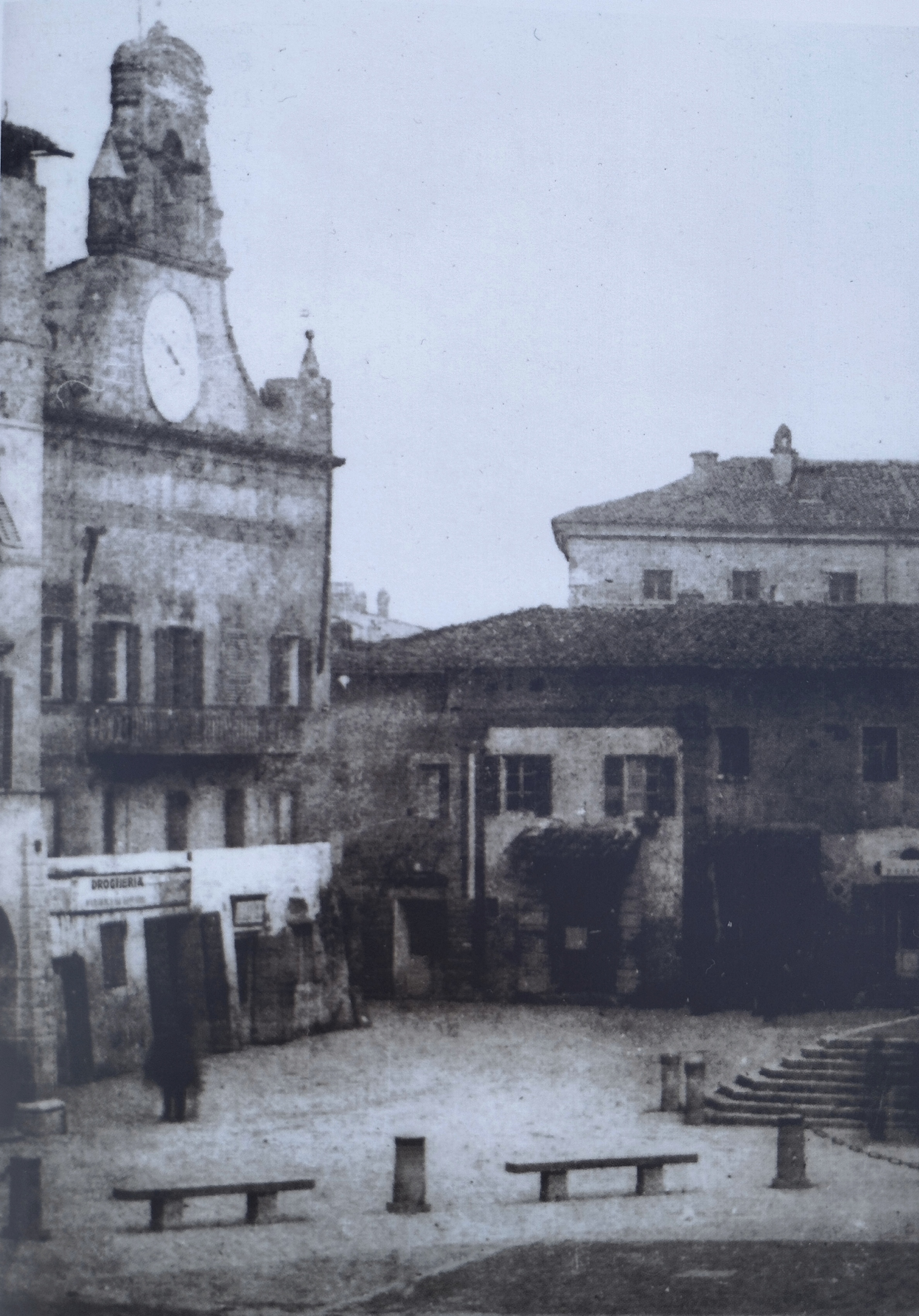
The square in mid-19th century

The origins of the square date back to the 15th century, when two key buildings, the cathedral (representing religious authority) and the Palazzo dei Priori (representing civil authority), faced each other in the city's central point. Beside the cathedral, a cluster of buildings formed the church and hospital of San Giovanni Decollato (St. John the Baptist). As shown in the 1749 map by Odoardo Warren, the forward position of the Palazzo dei Priori and the presence of the hospital obscured the entrance to the main street. The distance between the Palazzo dei Priori and the cathedral was deliberately narrow to create a close-up perspective of the facade, enhancing the imposing appearance of the church.

Between 1867 and 1870, a new town hall was built, necessitating the demolition of structures on the northern side of the square, including the former church of San Giovanni Decollato. By 1937, the now-dilapidated and unused Palazzo dei Priori was also demolished. Its removal, and the construction of a new building set further back, expanded the square, giving the cathedral facade more prominence and creating a direct opening to Corso Carducci.

== Buildings ==
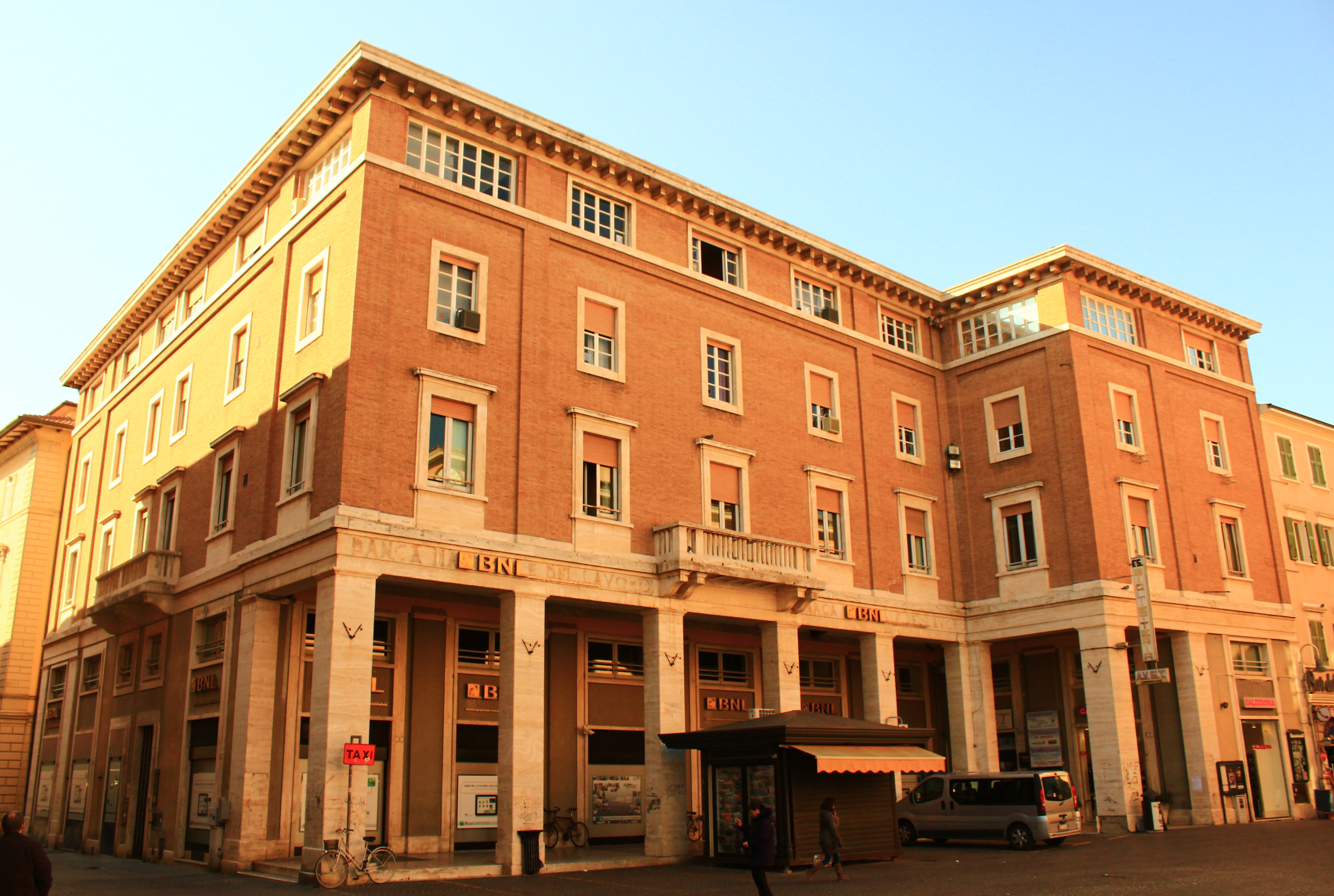
Palazzo Alben

=== Grosseto Cathedral ===
The Cathedral of St. Lawrence is located on the eastern side of the square. The church was built in the 13th century on the presumed site of the early medieval parish church of Santa Maria. The structure was rebuilt in the 16th century by Antonio Maria Lari, with further renovations between 1840 and 1865 altering its Renaissance appearance in an attempt to restore its original medieval form. The facade facing Piazza del Duomo reflects Romanesque-inspired tastes with white-and-red bichromy and Gothic-style elements. It features statues of the Four Evangelists from the 14th century, a central rose window depicting the Redeemer, two 16th-century side tabernacles, a balcony with original columns, and a tympanum with religious imagery (1897) created by artist Leopoldo Maccari.

=== Town Hall ===
The Palazzo Comunale (Town Hall) is located on the northern side of the square and houses the executive, council, and administrative offices of the Municipality of Grosseto. The building was constructed starting in 1867, based on a design by Giovanni Clive, in a predominantly Neo-Renaissance style, and completed in 1870. It stands on the site of the church of San Giovanni Decollato, which had already been deconsecrated and repurposed as a warehouse before its demolition. Under the loggia of the Town Hall, a series of commemorative plaques are displayed.

=== Palazzo Alben ===
The Palazzo Alben is located on the western side of Piazza del Duomo, opposite the cathedral. The building was constructed between 1948 and 1950 by the ALBEN company, on the site of the medieval Palazzo dei Priori, which was demolished in 1938 by the Fascist city government to make way for the headquarters of the National Institute for Social Security. It is home to the Banca Nazionale del Lavoro. The building stands as an imposing structure that still reflects Rationalist architectural principles, featuring a loggia on the ground floor.

== Sources ==
- Guide d'Italia. Toscana. Milan: Touring Club Italiano. 2012.
- Celuzza, Mariagrazia; Papa, Mauro (2013). Grosseto visibile. Guida alla città e alla sua arte pubblica. Arcidosso: Edizioni Effigi.
- Innocenti, Mario; Innocenti, Elena (2005). Grosseto: briciole di storia. Cartoline e documenti d'epoca 1899-1944. Grosseto: Editrice Innocenti.
- Parisi, Marcella (2001). Grosseto dentro e fuori porta. L'emozione e il pensiero. Arcidosso: C&P Adver Effigi.
