= Palazzo del Governo, Grosseto =

Building in Grosseto, Italy

Palazzo del Governo
- Interactive map of the Palazzo del Governo area

General information
- Architectural style: Neoclassicism
- Location: Piazza Fratelli Rosselli; Grosseto, Tuscany, Italy
- Coordinates: 42°45′50.3″N 11°06′44.26″E
- Construction started: 1923
- Completed: 1927
- Inaugurated: 1927; 99 years ago
- Owner: Italian State

Design and construction
- Architect: Vittorio Mariani

The Palazzo del Governo (Government Palace) is an administrative building which serves as the Italian Prefecture headquarters in Grosseto, Tuscany. It was designed in a Neoclassical style by architect Vittorio Mariani and completed in 1927. The building is situated in the suburb of Porta Nuova, outside the city walls, and is bordered by Via Roma and Viale Guglielmo Oberdan, overlooking Piazza Fratelli Rosselli, commonly known as Piazza della Vasca.

== History ==
Originally planned for Piazza Dante, the project was relocated to Piazza Umberto I (now Piazza Fratelli Rosselli) due to logistical and cost issues. Initial plans by engineer Giuseppe Luciani proposed a classicist, Renaissance Revival design with a three-story structure. However, due to challenges in acquiring land within the city walls, the site was moved, and architect Vincenzo Fasolo took over. Fasolo's design featured a pentagon-shaped building with a grand central staircase and eclectic architecture blending neo-medieval and neo-Cinquecento styles.

Construction began in 1922 but faced delays and budget issues. Architect Attilio Muggia criticised Fasolo's design for its asymmetry and incongruity. Consequently, the project was reassigned to architect Vittorio Mariani, who simplified and adapted the design to fit the neoclassical style and the grandeur of the square. Mariani's design was completed and the palace was inaugurated in 1927. The project was closely monitored by engineer Valentino Nelli, who made several modifications to ensure the building met its intended public function.

== Description ==
The building, a symbol of central power and in stark contrast to emerging rationalism of the time, adopts a strictly neoclassical architectural language with a rigorous and compact volume.

Pentagon-shaped, it faces the city's square with a broad, concave front. The central section, slightly advanced from the masonry line, features a smooth rusticated ground floor with three entrance arches. Above these arches, a large loggia, framed by pilasters, is accentuated by six massive Ionic columns on plinths, separated by five long French windows with small balconies. The loggia, reinforcing the classical and "solemn" character of the design, includes decorative elements like frames, medallions, and relief friezes. It is topped by a pediment with an inscription. Beyond the projecting cornice, the upper terrace railing is adorned with an attic featuring a coat of arms flanked by brackets and topped with a broken circular pediment.

Flanking the loggia, the facade is divided into three levels by two axes of windows, arched and framed with rustication on the ground floor and rectangular with projecting lintels and cornices on the upper floors. The window design is repeated identically on the facades of Via Roma and Via Oberdan, which are symmetrical with seven openings over three floors. The rear on Via Damiano Chiesa is simpler, with only two floors and a terrace. On the main facades, column bases and spaces between first-floor windows, highlighted by the cornice and continuous sills, are decorated with wrought-iron lamps with three globes. The three arches on the ground floor leads to an entrance gallery with nine bays divided by cross pillar covered with ribbed vaults. At the lateral ends of the central section are two entrances. The right leads to the Prefect's private apartments and the left to offices, both preceded by short marble staircases. Opposite, a large rectangular courtyard is distinguished by the projecting circular wall of the rear section. It was originally designed as a staircase by Fasolo, where the Meeting Room is located on the first floor. The rear section's internal facade, echoing the main facade's motifs but with a reversed curvature, features arched ground floor windows and composite pilasters separating the tall rectangular windows on the first floor. The section ends with a projecting flat cornice crowned by the upper terrace railing.

== Critical reception ==
As Grosseto rapidly underwent urban changes and extensive building renovations, the revival of classical architectural language used in the palace became "the possible choice, the model and method available to meet the symbolic-representative needs of the new institutional power". According to Famiani (1995), the palace took on "the role of a figurative pivot within the grand urban theme" of Piazza Fratelli Rosselli, designated as a representative space for the Fascist regime. Despite its impeccable "state classicism" rhetoric, the building, while contributing significantly to "the creation and strengthening of consensus", also possesses "innovative features", such as the unusual pentagon-shaped layout.

== Sources ==
- Grosseto fuori Porta Nuova. Lo sviluppo di Grosseto a nord delle mura dalla metà dell'Ottocento al secondo dopoguerra. Grosseto: Innocenti Editore. 2009.
- Mariagrazia Celuzza; Mauro Papa, eds. (2013). Grosseto visibile. Guida alla città e alla sua arte pubblica. Arcidosso: Edizioni Effigi.
- Maddalena Corti, ed. (1995). Grosseto post-unitaria. Grosseto: Archivio di Stato di Grosseto.
- Enrico Crispolti; Anna Mazzanti; Luca Quattrocchi, eds. (2006). Arte in Maremma nella prima metà del Novecento. Milano: Silvana Editoriale.
