= Reginaldo Monticelli =

Italian politician (1906–1993)

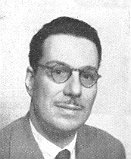
- Monticelli in 1948

Member of the Constituent Assembly of Italy
- In office 12 September 1946 – 31 January 1948

Member of the Chamber of Deputies
- In office 1 June 1948 – 24 June 1953

Personal details
- Born: 10 April 1906 Rome, Kingdom of Italy
- Died: 13 February 1993 (aged 86)
- Party: Christian Democracy

Reginaldo Monticelli (10 April 1906 – 13 February 1993) was an Italian politician who served as a member of the Constituent Assembly of Italy (1946–1948) and Deputy (1948–1953). He was also city councilor of Grosseto from 1951 to 1970.

== Bibliography ==
- Bonifazi, Emilio (2015). Grosseto e i suoi amministratori dal 1944 al 2015. Grosseto: Innocenti Editore.
