= Ludovico Quaroni =

Italian architect (1911–1987)

- Born: 28 March 1911; Rome, Kingdom of Italy
- Died: 22 July 1987 (aged 76); Rome, Italy
- Education: University of Rome
- Occupations: Architect, urban planner, university professor, critic

Ludovico Quaroni (28 March 1911 – 22 July 1987) was an Italian architect, urban planner, critic and university professor.

== Life and career ==
Quaroni studied at the University of Rome, graduating in 1934. He participated in several significant architectural competitions in the late 1930s.

During World War II, Quaroni was a prisoner in India but returned to Italy in 1946. He was active in the APAO (Association for Organic Architecture) and contributed to notable projects like the INA-Casa plan in the Tiburtino quarter in Rome. In 1948, he designed the new church of San Franco in Francavilla al Mare, completed a decade later.

Quaroni served as vice-president of the National Institute of Urbanism (1947-51) and worked on urban plans for several Italian cities. He was also involved in the "UNRRA-Casas" project in Matera and supported Adriano Olivetti's political initiatives. In 1956, he won the Olivetti Prize for Urbanism.

He taught architecture at various universities, including Rome, Naples, and Florence, and was a founding member of the University of Reggio Calabria's Faculty of Architecture. Quaroni died in Rome in 1987.

== Works (selection) ==
- Piazza Imperiale Roma EUR, Rome (1938, with Saverio Muratori and Luigi Moretti)
- INA-Casa Tiburtino housing development, Rome (1947–1955, with Mario Ridolfi)
- Church of Santa Maria Maggiore (San Franco), Francavilla al Mare (1948)
- La Martella village, Matera (1952–1954, with Federico Gorio, Michele Valori and Piero Maria Lugli)
- Church of the Holy Family, Genoa (1956, with Adolfo De Carlo, Andrea Mor and Angelo Sibilla)
- INA-Casa Casilino housing development, Rome (1962, with Gabriella Esposito and Roberto Maestro)
- Il Gualdo Housing, Punta Ala (1963–1967, with Maestro)
- Cosimini Building, Grosseto (1970–1978)
