= Grosseto Cathedral =

- Cathedral of Saint Lawrence
- Duomo di Grosseto (Italian)
- Cattedrale di San Lorenzo (Italian)
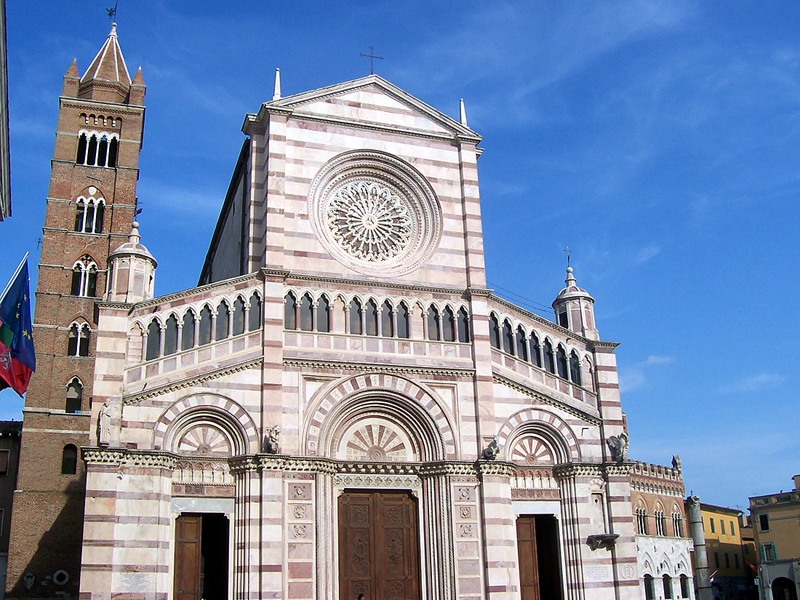
- Grosseto Cathedral
- Grosseto Cathedral
- 42.76°N 11.1137°E
- Location: Grosseto, Tuscany
- Address: Piazza del Duomo
- Country: Italy
- Denomination: Roman Catholic
- Tradition: Latin Rite

History
- Status: Cathedral

Architecture
- Architect: Sozzo Rustichini
- Architectural type: Church
- Style: Italian Gothic, Romanesque, Classical
- Groundbreaking: 1294

Administration
- Diocese: Diocese of Grosseto

Clergy
- Bishop: Bernardino Giordano

Grosseto Cathedral (Italian: Cattedrale di San Lorenzo, Duomo di Grosseto) is a Roman Catholic cathedral located in the Piazza del Duomo in Grosseto, Tuscany, Italy. It is the cathedral of the diocese of Grosseto and is dedicated to Saint Lawrence.

== History ==
Construction began at the end of the 13th century, under the architect Sozzo Rustichini of Siena. Erected over the earlier church of Santa Maria Assunta, it was not finished until the 15th century (mainly because of the continuing struggles against Siena).

The façade of alternate layers of white and black marble is Romanesque in style, but is almost entirely the result of restorations in the 16th century and in 1816–1855; it retains decorative parts of the original buildings, including the symbols of the Evangelists. The groundplan is a Latin cross, with transept and apse. The interior has a nave with two aisles, separated by cruciform pilasters. The main artworks are a wondrously carved baptismal font from 1470 to 1474 and the Madonna delle Grazie by Matteo di Giovanni (1470).

The campanile (bell tower) was finished in 1402, and restored in 1911.
