= Casa del Fascio (disambiguation) =

Casa del Fascio was a building housing the local branch of the National Fascist Party and later the Republican Fascist Party under the regime of Italian Fascism

Casa del Fascio may also refer to:

- Casa del Fascio (Bolzano)
- Casa del Fascio (Como)
- Casa del Fascio (Mogadishu)
- Casa del Fascio (Grosseto)
- Casa del Fascio (Varese)
