= Porta Vecchia =

14th-century city gate in Grosseto, Italy

- Grosseto, Tuscany
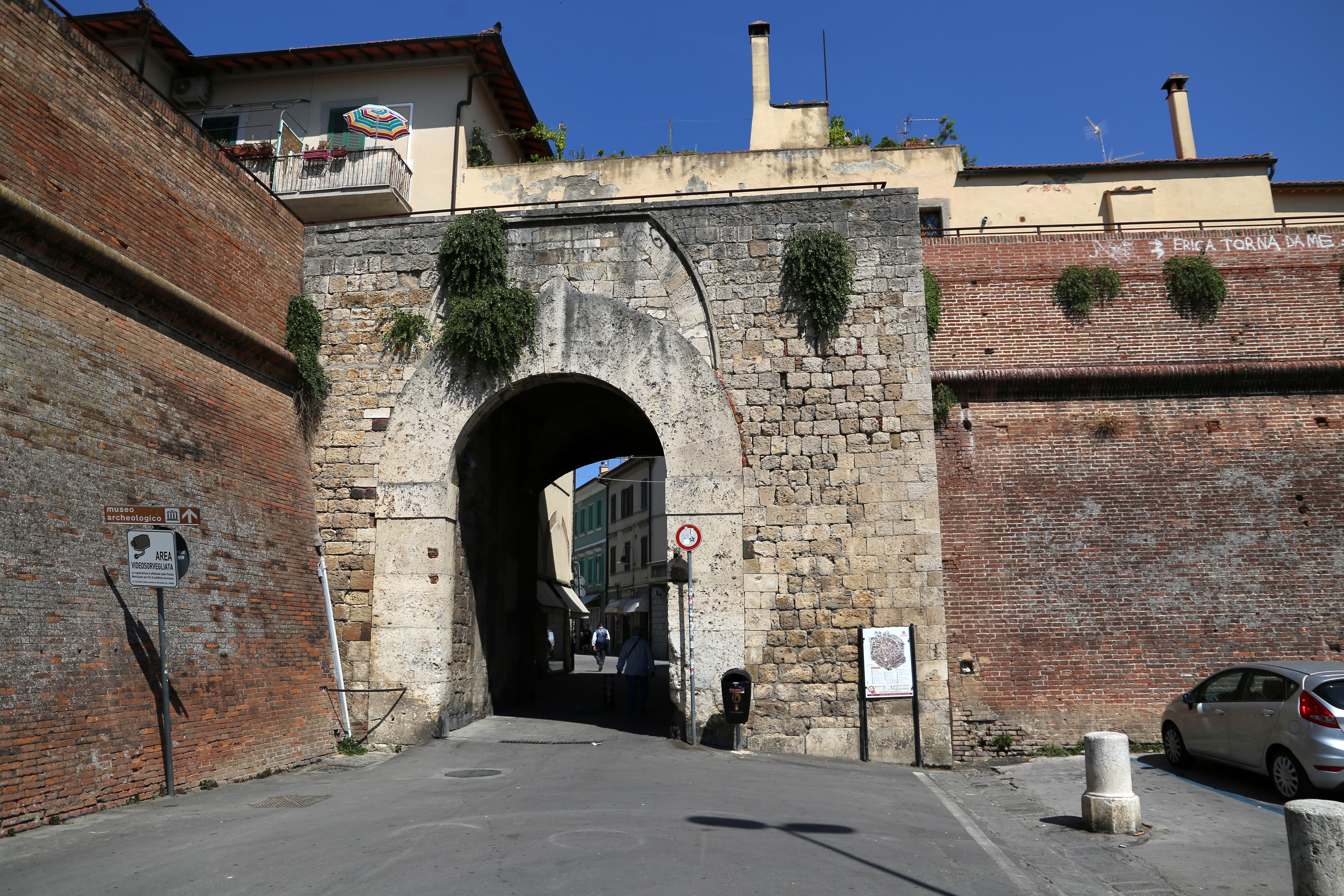
- Porta Vecchia in 2019

Site information
- Type: City gate
- Owner: City of Grosseto
- Condition: Well-preserved or intact

Location
- Coordinates: 42.7587°N 11.1147°E

Site history
- Built: 14th century
- Built by: Republic of Siena
- Materials: Stone

Porta Vecchia (transl. Old Gate) is the oldest city gate in the walls of Grosseto, located at the southern corner of the fortifications. Together with the Cassero Senese, it is one of the two surviving architectural elements from the 14th-century city walls, having endured the extensive reconstruction work carried out by the Medici in the late 16th century.

== History ==
Porta Vecchia, dating back to the 14th century, was the southern gateway to the medieval walls of Grosseto and was originally known as Porta Cittadina. The gateway featured a defensive tower known as a "cassero".

During the 16th century, when the Medici constructed new fortifications for the city (1565–1593), Porta Vecchia was preserved and incorporated into the new walls. Renamed Porta Reale, it served as the sole entrance to the city for over two centuries, central to all major roads. A second entrance, Porta Nuova, was only added in 1755 at the northern end of the city.

Between 1848 and 1850 the fortifications were de-militarized, transforming the walls and walkways into public gardens. In 1854, the medieval tower above the gate was demolished, and in 1882, the left orillon of the Cavallerizza Bastion was removed to create more space in front of the gate. This modification, remembered by a plaque on the outer walls of the bastion, was initiated by Prefect Stefano De Maria di Casalnuovo, after whom the square outside Porta Vecchia is named.

By the end of the 19th century the area south of the city, between Porta Vecchia and the Ombrone River, saw the development of the first suburb beyond the city walls.

== Description ==
Porta Vecchia is located on the southeast side of the Grosseto city walls, on the right side of the Cavallerizza Bastion. From the outside, the gate provides access to the historic center, leading into Piazza del Sale.

The gate features a double entry through the walls. On the exterior, it is distinguished by a round arch made of travertine, above which is an older, pointed arch whose top was cut off during the 1854 renovations that included the demolition of the medieval watchtower.

Below the gate are two plaques: one commemorates the partisans who fell during the liberation of the city, and the other recalls the 1328 siege of Grosseto. However, the latter contains a historical error, attributing the defense of the city to Bino degli Abati del Malia, who had actually died about ten years earlier.

== See also ==
- Cassero Senese
- Porta Corsica
- Walls of Grosseto

== Sources ==
- Beranger, Eugenio Maria (1987). Fonti per lo studio delle mura di Grosseto dal 1767 al 1950 (PDF). Rome: Paleani Editore. Archived from the original (PDF) on 2020-03-28.
- Boschi, Mariano (2014). Grosseto e le sue mura. Ghezzano: Felici Editore.
- Celuzza, Mariagrazia; Papa, Mauro (2013). Grosseto visibile. Guida alla città e alla sua arte pubblica. Arcidosso: Effigi.
- Mazzini, Vanessa (1996). Immagine e arredo urbano a Grosseto. L'asse della città da Piazza Fratelli Rosselli a Piazza De Maria. Grosseto: I Portici.
- Polito, Concetta; Marri, Alessandro; Perin, Luca (1990). Le mura di Grosseto. Rilievi e studi per il recupero. Florence: Alinea Editrice.
