= Casbeno =

Neighbourhood of Varese, Italy

- neighbourhood of Varese
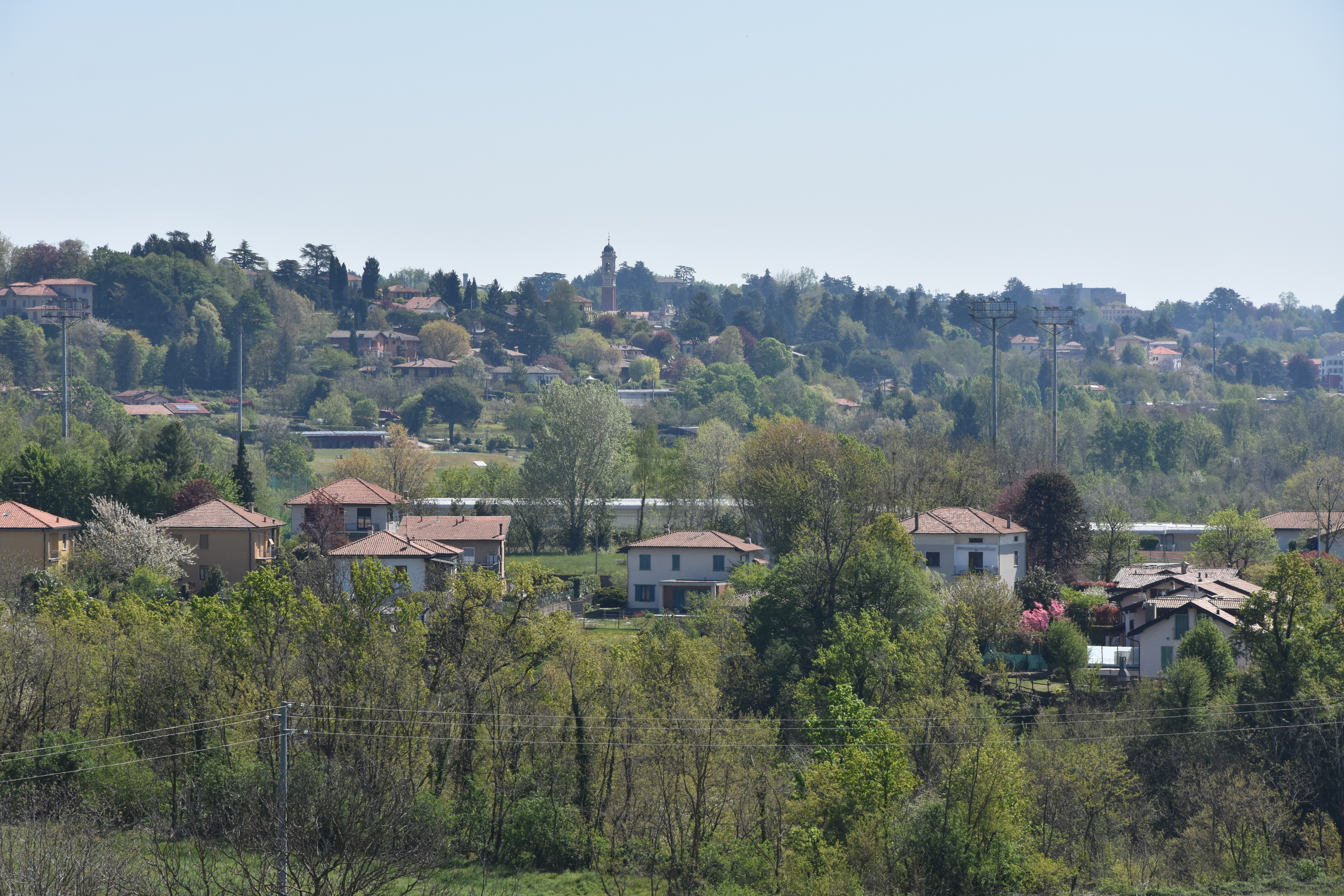
- Interactive map of Casbeno
- Coordinates: 45°48′52.0″N 8°48′29.6″E
- Country: Italy
- Region: Lombardy
- Province: Varese
- Comune: Varese
- Aggregazione Rionale: 1

Population
  - Total: 4,000
- Time zone: UTC+1 (CET)
  - Summer (DST): UTC+2 (CEST)
- Postal code: 21100

Casbeno (Lombard: Casben) is a neighbourhood of the city of Varese. Located in the south of the city, overlooking Lake Varese, before the formation of the province of Varese, in the twenties, was the lower limit of the town itself. Initially a rural fraction of the city, Casbeno has seen since the sixties a period of growth, which continues to this day: Casbeno currently has about 4,000 inhabitants, called Casbenàt in Lombard language.

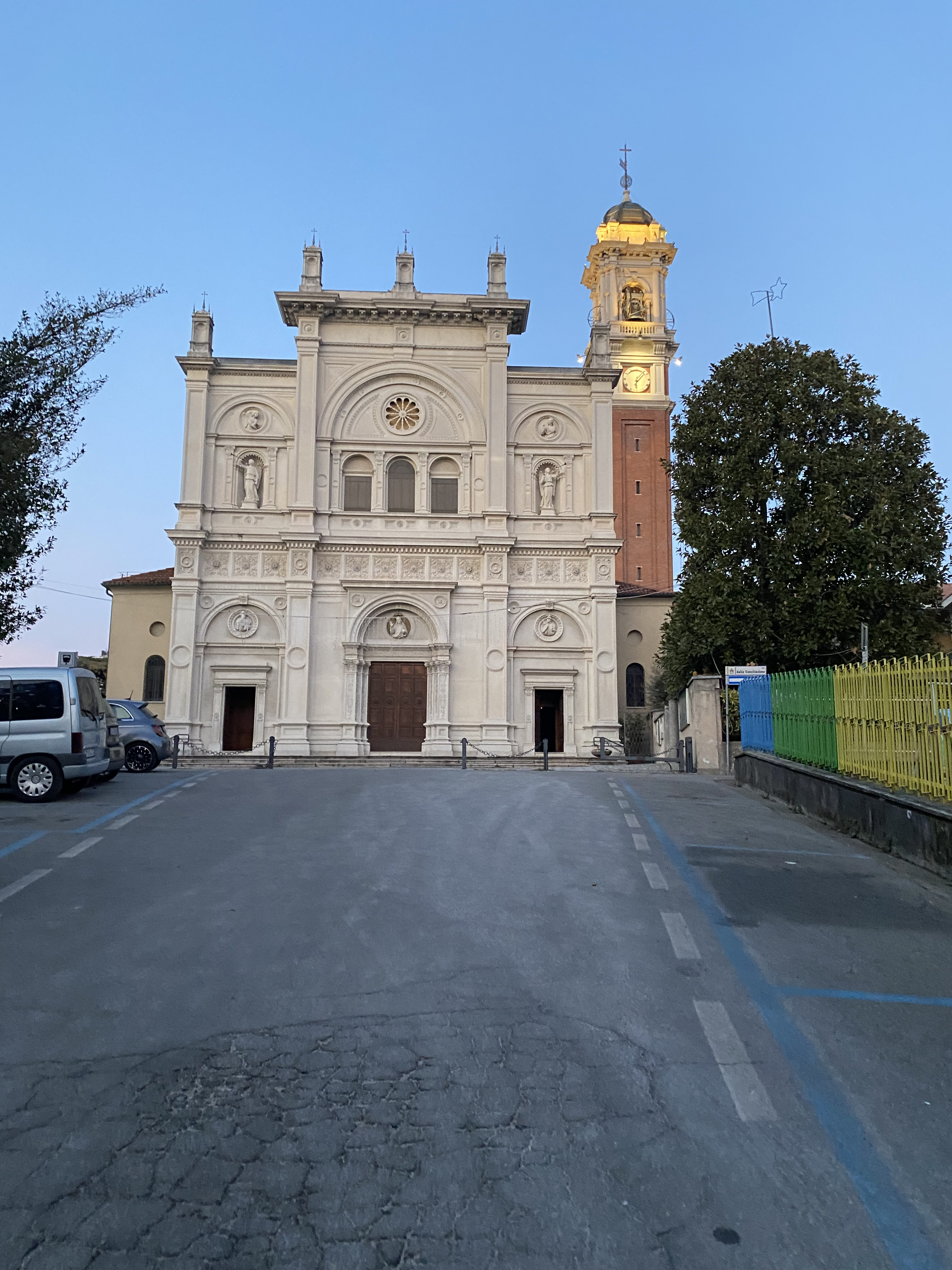
The Church of San Vittore in Casbeno

Despite the limited area, Casbeno is home to several administrative offices: around Piazzale Libertà, there is the provincial police headquarters (Questura di Varese, housed in the former Casa del Fascio) and the official headquarters of the Province. The prefect and the Province of Varese, located at Villa Recalcati, with the adjoining park, are an example of the '800 architecture. Artistically relevant to Casbeno are also the parish church of San Vittore and the sanctuary of Schirannetta (first construction dates back to 1200), carefully restored in the 60's by Giovanni Macchi, after the neglect of the past centuries had reduced its condition to ruin. The architect Simone Cantoni built the neoclassical Villa Recalcati in 1778.

In the neighbourhood, there is the station of Varese Casbeno, on the Milan-Saronno-Laveno railway.
