= Cassero del Sale =

13th-century building in Grosseto, Italy

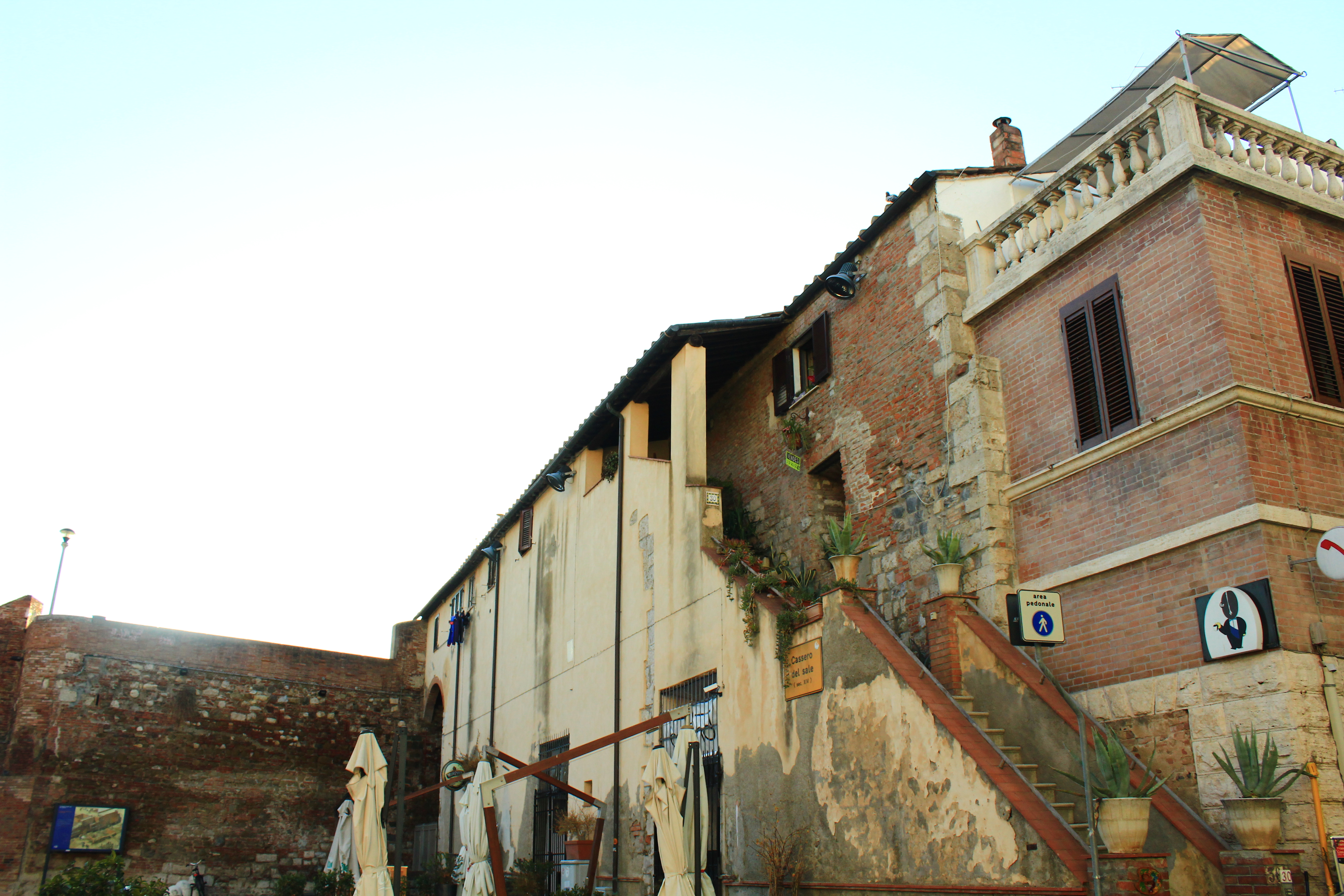
- Interactive map of the Cassero del Sale area

General information
- Location: Piazza del Sale / Via Giuseppe Mazzini; Grosseto, Tuscany
- Coordinates: 42°45′31.8″N 11°06′51.14″E

The Cassero del Sale (Salt Warehouse) is a 13th-century building in Grosseto, Tuscany. It is located in Piazza del Mercato, also known as Piazza del Sale, and was built to store the salt collected from the wetland areas of the region. The building currently houses several commercial activities.

== History ==
The building was erected around the mid-13th century in the terzo of San Giorgio. It functioned as a central hub for collecting and distributing salt harvested along the coast. Salt extraction in the area dates back to the 8th century, using the brackish waters of the Lake Prile. By the early 14th century, salt production had become a major economic driver for the city, with the Sienese establishing control over this profitable trade. The Sienese also built a new salt warehouse next to the existing structure. The significant stockpile of salt in Grosseto was so renowned that it was referenced by the poet Cecco Angiolieri in one of his poems.

The building's present look is the result of various modifications over the centuries. Starting in the 16th century, the Medici added their own fortifying walls, and later, in early 20th century, a new structure was added and an external staircase was installed for access to the first floor.

In the square, the remains of the "new salt warehouse" built by the Sienese in the 14th century to complement the older one are still visible. During the Medici period, the building was largely demolished, but one of its original walls was preserved and incorporated into the new city walls.

== Sources ==
- Innocenti, Elena; Innocenti, Mario (1993). Grosseto: briciole di storia. Grosseto: Innocenti Editore.
- Mariagrazia Celuzza; Mauro Papa, eds. (2013). Grosseto visibile. Guida alla città e alla sua arte pubblica. Arcidosso: Edizioni Effigi.
- Mazzini, Vanessa (1996). Immagine e arredo urbano a Grosseto. L'asse della città da Piazza Fratelli Rosselli a Piazza De Maria. Grosseto: I Portici.
- Parisi, Marcella (2001). Grosseto dentro e fuori porta. L'emozione e il pensiero. Siena: C&P Adver Effigi.
