= Piazza del Sale =

Public square in Grosseto, Italy

Piazza del Mercato
- Piazza del Sale
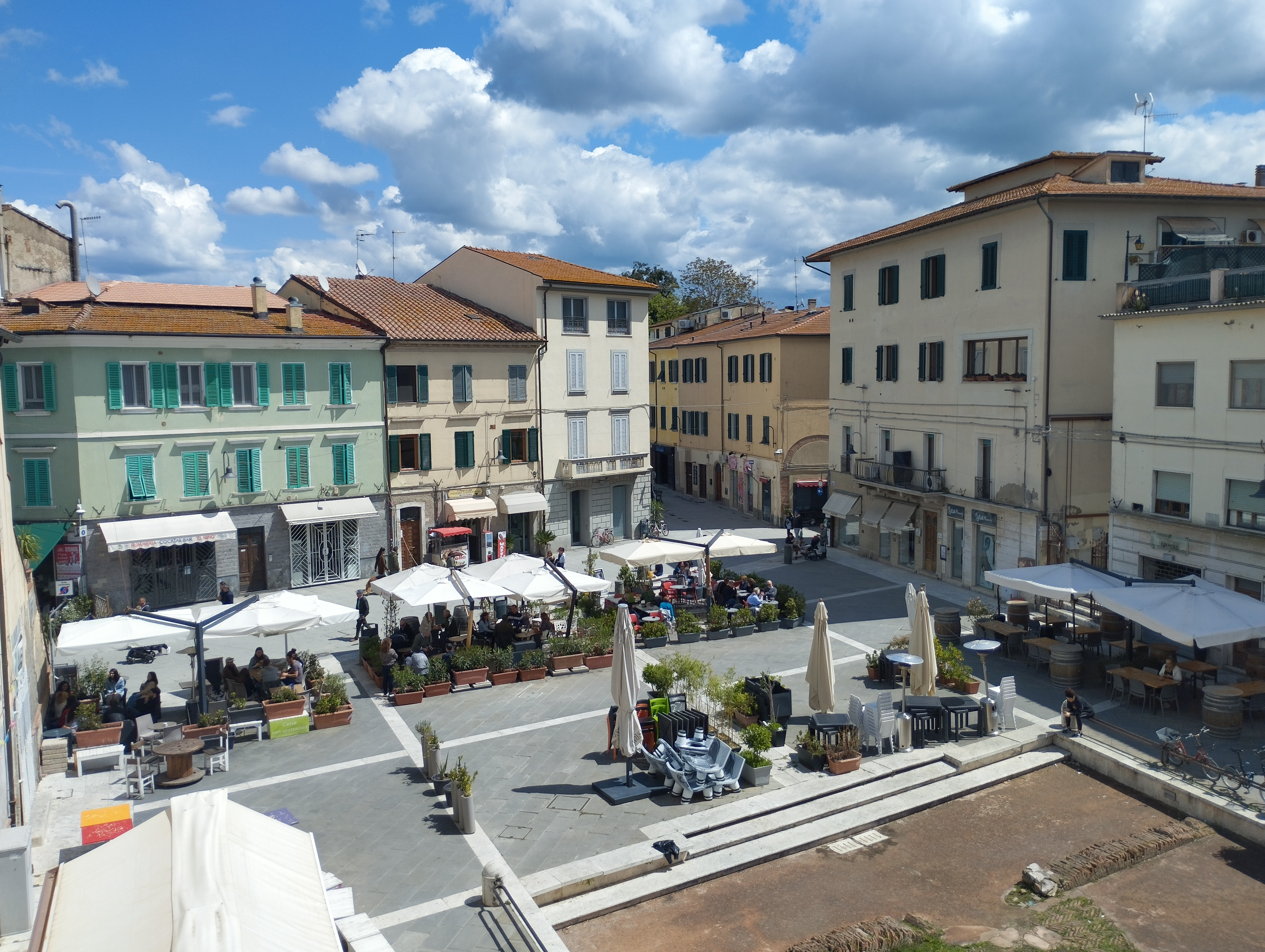

- Location within Tuscany
- Location: Grosseto, Tuscany, Italy
- Coordinates: 42°45′32″N 11°06′51″E

Piazza del Mercato (lit. 'Market's Square'), better known as Piazza del Sale (lit. 'Salt's Square') is a public square in the historic centre of Grosseto, Tuscany, Italy.

Named for its historical role as a medieval salt storage hub, the square has been a key site in Grosseto since the 13th century. Anchored by the Cassero del Sale, where salt from local salines was stored, the square was central to the city's economy. Later shaped by Siena and Medici influences, it evolved into a market and commercial center. Archaeological excavations have revealed, next to the old Cassero, remnants of a Sienese salt depot, which remain visible today.

== History ==
The square has been documented since 1291, originally serving as the center of the "Terzo di San Giorgio", named after the church of San Giorgio. In the 13th century, the construction of the Cassero del Sale made the square pivotal for storing salt essential to the city's economy. Following Siena's conquest, the square underwent major changes, including the creation of a new salt depot in 1430. During the Medici era, the demolition of Sienese walls and construction of Medici fortifications reshaped the square, including the addition of a staircase to the old Cassero del Sale.

In the 19th century, extensive renovations included demolishing towers, transforming the walls into gardens, and establishing the square as "Piazza d'Armi" for military assemblies. By the late 19th century, the square became a vibrant hub, hosting the weekly market and livestock fairs, gaining the name Piazza del Mercato, which it still holds officially.

In the 1970s, the market moved outside the city walls to Piazza De Maria, prompting repaving of the square. Archaeological excavations beginning in 1998 uncovered remnants of medieval structures and the second cassero built by Siena. These findings are preserved in a lowered section of the square, visible near the Medici walls.

== Description ==
The square is bordered to the south and west by Porta Vecchia and the curtain wall extending to the Cavallerizza Bastion, where a pedestrian walkway provides access outside the historic center. The eastern side is defined by the first buildings of Via Ricasoli, which links Piazza del Sale with Piazza Dante, while the northern side is enclosed by the ancient Cassero del Sale, whose facade stands between the inner side of the bastion and the beginning of Via Mazzini.

The eastern side of the square features three early 20th-century buildings, the Palazzetto Cesaroni, Palazzetto Gualandi, and Palazzetto Onorato. At the entrance to Via Ricasoli stands the Palazzo Carmignani, featuring original Art Nouveau decorations from a historic shoemaker's shop.

== Sources ==
- Mariagrazia Celuzza; Mauro Papa, eds. (2013). Grosseto visibile. Guida alla città e alla sua arte pubblica. Arcidosso: Edizioni Effigi.
- Maddalena Corti, ed. (1995). Grosseto post-unitaria. Grosseto: Archivio di Stato di Grosseto.
- Enrico Crispolti; Anna Mazzanti; Luca Quattrocchi, eds. (2006). Arte in Maremma nella prima metà del Novecento. Milano: Silvana Editoriale.
- Roberto Farinelli; Riccardo Francovich (2000). Guida alla Maremma medievale. Itinerari di archeologia nella provincia di Grosseto. Siena: Nuova Immagine.
- Innocenti, Mario; Innocenti, Elena (2005). Grosseto: briciole di storia. Cartoline e documenti d'epoca 1899-1944. Grosseto: Innocenti Editore.
- Innocenti, Mario; Innocenti, Stefano (2003). Grosseto: briciole di storia. Cronaca fotografica della città e della periferia (Ponte Tura, ippodromo del Casalone, il Deposito etc.) dalla seconda metà del XVIII secolo agli anni sessanta del Novecento. Grosseto: Innocenti Editore.
