= Varese Casbeno railway station =

Railway station in Italy

Varese Casbeno
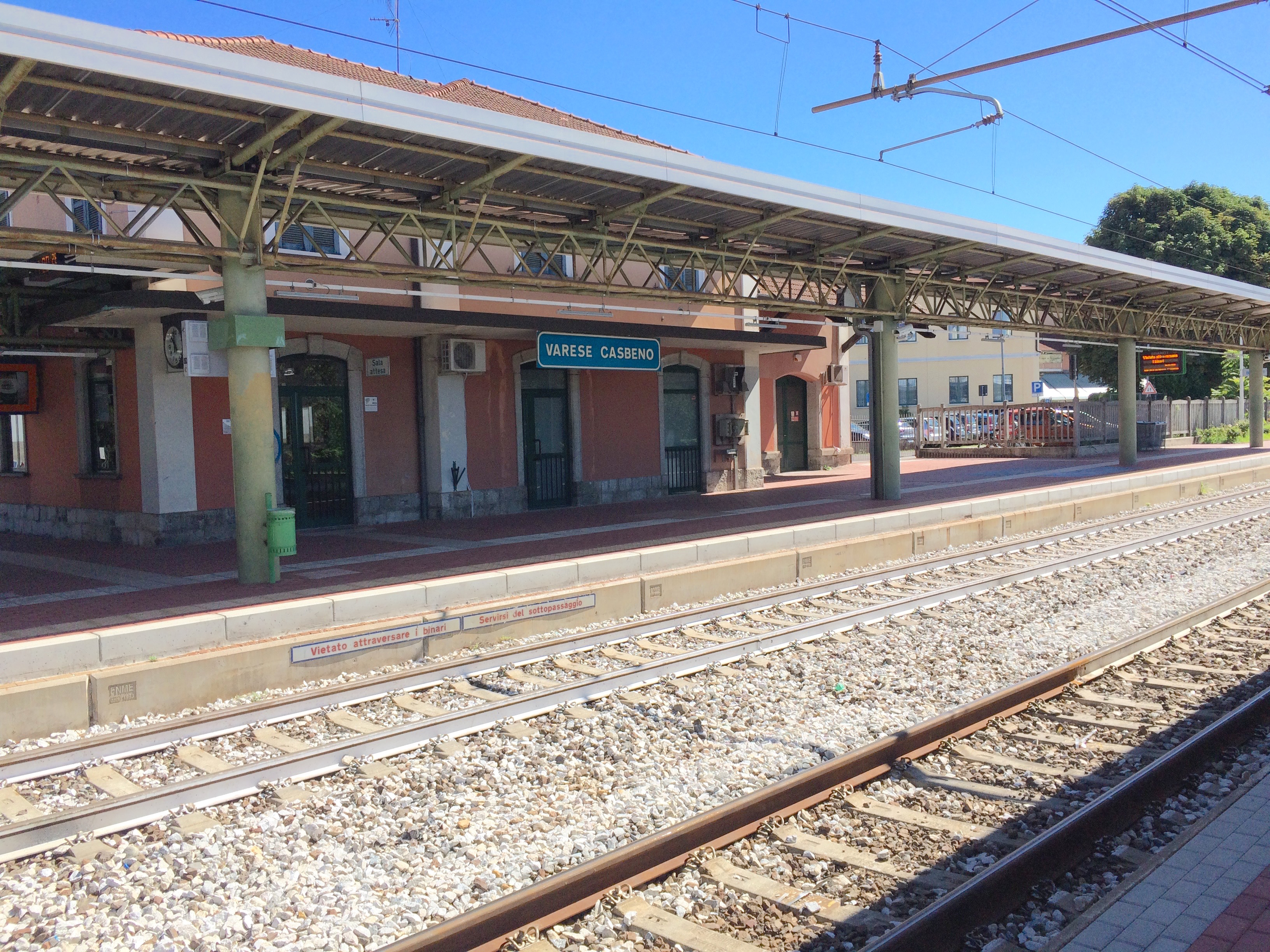

General information
- Location: Piazza Antonio Meucci, 21100 Varese; Varese, Varese, Lombardy; Italy
- Coordinates: 45°48′54″N 08°48′41″E
- Operator: Ferrovienord
- Line: Saronno–Laveno railway
- Platforms: 2
- Train operators: Trenord
- Connections: Urban buses - lines AB, B, N

Construction
- Accessible: yes

Other information
- Website: https://www.trenord.it/en/

History
- Opened: 1886; 140 years ago
Location
- Location within Lombardy Location within Northern Italy Location within Italy

Varese Casbeno railway station (Italian: Stazione di Varese Casbeno) serves the neighborhood of Casbeno in the city of Varese in Lombardy, northern Italy. It is located on the Saronno–Laveno railway. The station is managed by Ferrovienord.

== See also ==
- History of rail transport in Italy
- List of railway stations in Lombardy
- Rail transport in Italy
- Railway stations in Italy
