= Porta Corsica =

City gate in Grosseto, Italy

- Grosseto, Tuscany
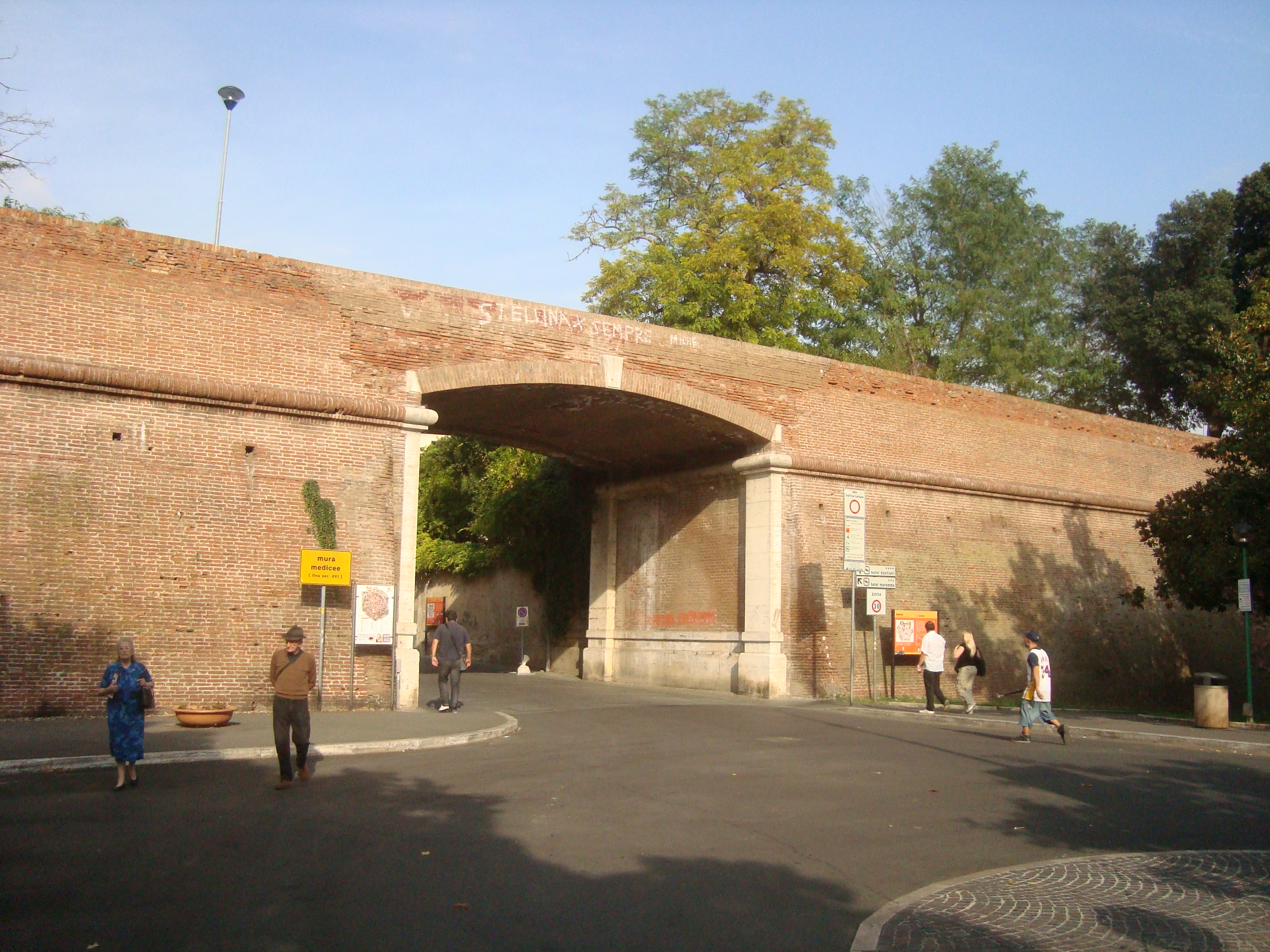
- Porta Corsica in 2009

Site information
- Type: City gate
- Owner: City of Grosseto

Location
- Coordinates: 42.7596°N 11.1122°E

Site history
- Built: 1930–1933
- Built by: City of Grosseto
- Architect: Luigi Sapori

Porta Corsica is a gate along the south-western section of the city walls of Grosseto. Its name is derived from the geographical reference point in that direction, across the sea, towards which the gate faces. It is situated along the stretch of the city wall that connects the Cavallerizza Bastion to the Molino a Vento Bastion.

== History ==
The presence of a western city gate is documented in the medieval city walls of Grosseto, known as Porta di San Michele, named after a nearby church dedicated to Saint Michael. This gate was demolished in the 16th century when the Grand Duchy of Tuscany built the new Medici walls (1565–1593), and a new bastion, the Bastion of San Michele, was constructed on its site. For over two centuries, Grosseto had only one access point, the Porta Reale (later renamed Porta Vecchia) on the southern side of the walls, until Porta Nuova was opened in 1755 on the northern side.

With the city's population growth and urban expansion outside the walls at the turn of the 20th century, a new gateway was deemed necessary. In 1927, under the initiative of the podestà Ado Scaramucci, the city held a national competition for a new city plan and expansion project, which included a new gate. The winning design by architects Cesare Chiodi and Giuseppe Merlo proposed a monumental three-arch gate in the classicism style of Giovanni Muzio and the Novecento group. However, this design was not implemented, and the task was reassigned to engineer Luigi Sapori in 1929. The gate was ultimately built according to Sapori's plan, with construction completed in 1933.

Post-war modifications included the removal of a travertine block with a fascist emblem. In 1961, the area outside the gate along Viale Ximenes was turned into a public park. In 2002, with the transformation of Grosseto's historic center into a limited traffic zone, Porta Corsica became the sole vehicle access point to the center, equipped with an electronic gate installed in 2008.

== Description ==
The gate provides access from Via Gramsci, located outside the city walls, to Via Manin and Via Mazzini in the historic center, and vice versa. It is reserved exclusively for pedestrians and authorized vehicles, serving as the only vehicle-accessible entry to the historic center, subject to permission.

The gate, matching the width of the roadway, features a broad, lowered archway that extends just below the level of the adjacent pedestrian walkway on the walls.

== Sources ==
- Beranger, Eugenio Maria (1987). Fonti per lo studio delle mura di Grosseto dal 1767 al 1950 (PDF). Rome: Paleani Editore. Archived from the original (PDF) on 2020-03-28.
- Boschi, Mariano (2014). Grosseto e le sue mura. Ghezzano: Felici Editore.
- Celuzza, Mariagrazia; Papa, Mauro (2013). Grosseto visibile. Guida alla città e alla sua arte pubblica. Arcidosso: Effigi.
- Enrico Crispolti; Anna Mazzanti; Luca Quattrocchi, eds. (2006). Arte in Maremma nella prima metà del Novecento. Milano: Silvana Editoriale.
- Polito, Concetta; Marri, Alessandro; Perin, Luca (1990). Le mura di Grosseto. Rilievi e studi per il recupero. Florence: Alinea Editrice.

== See also ==
- Porta Vecchia
- Walls of Grosseto
