= Casa del Fascio (Varese) =

Building in Lombardy, Italy

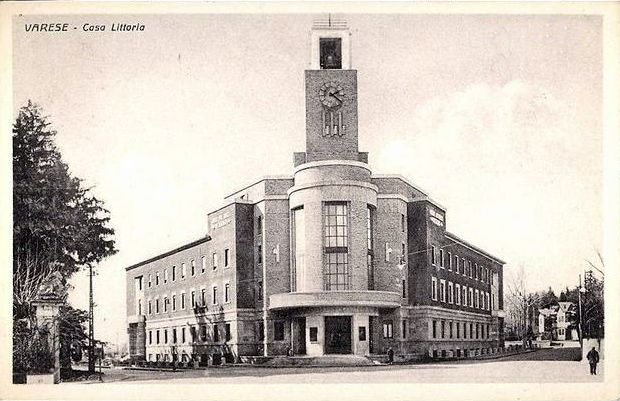
- Main facade

- Location within Lombardy Location within Italy
- Former names: Palazzo del Littorio
- Alternative names: Questura of Varese

General information
- Architectural style: Italian rationalism
- Location: Piazzale della Libertà 2, Varese, Lombardy, Italy
- Coordinates: 45°49′4.4″N 8°48′48.2″E
- Construction started: 1932
- Completed: 1936
- Inaugurated: 28 October 1933
- Owner: Province of Varese

Design and construction
- Architect: Mario Loreti
- Designations: Questura of Varese and Casa del Fascio

The former Casa del Fascio of Varese (Italian pronunciation: [ˈkaːza del ˈfaʃʃo]), (also Palazzo del Littorio) today known as Questura di Varese, is a building located in Varese, Italy.

Inaugurated in 1933, the building was designed by Mario Loreti as Casa del Fascio, the provincial headquarters of the National Fascist Party during Fascist Italy. It is recognized for its architectural significance as a representation of Italian Rationalism.

== Location ==
The Casa del Fascio is located on Piazzale Libertà 2, Varese, in the neighbourhood of Casbeno, near Palazzo del Governo and Villa Recalcati, which houses the provincial government. As with many fascist buildings, the building was located at a crossroads to emphasise its importance.

== History ==
=== Construction ===
The Casa del Fascio was designed by the Roman architect Mario Loreti, in cooperation with the engineer Edoardo Flumiani, who also worked on other buildings in Varese, including the fire station and Palestra XXV Aprile. It was built on a triangular plot of land given by the Province of Varese, which had only recently been established, to serve as the headquarters of the provincial party.

The Casa del Fascio was inaugurated on 28 October 1933, the anniversary of the March on Rome.

During Fascist Italy, the building often changed purpose, design, and use to reflect the fascist government's intentions and priorites. These changes represented how the party wanted to appear to the public. The building was part of the fascist regime's cohesive project of nationwide architectural renovation.

=== Italian Social Republic ===
The Casa del Fascio of Varese played a role in the rounding up and deportation of Jews during the Italian Social Republic, under the command of the Schutzstaffel. Following the promulgation of Italy's racial laws, Varese was sited on a key route for Jews fleeing Italy to reach freedom in neutral Switzerland. The head of the Civil Registry Office in the Casa del Fascio, Calogero Marrone, printed fake identity documents to allow Jews and political opponents of the regime to flee to Switzerland, until his arrest on 7 January 1944.

Between 1943 and 1945, between 173 and 185 Jewish people were deported from the Province of Varese. The final list of names of Jews to be arrested was published on 26 February 1944. The head of the Casa del Fascio slowed the deportation process and incurred complaints from the German occupying forces.

=== Post-war use ===
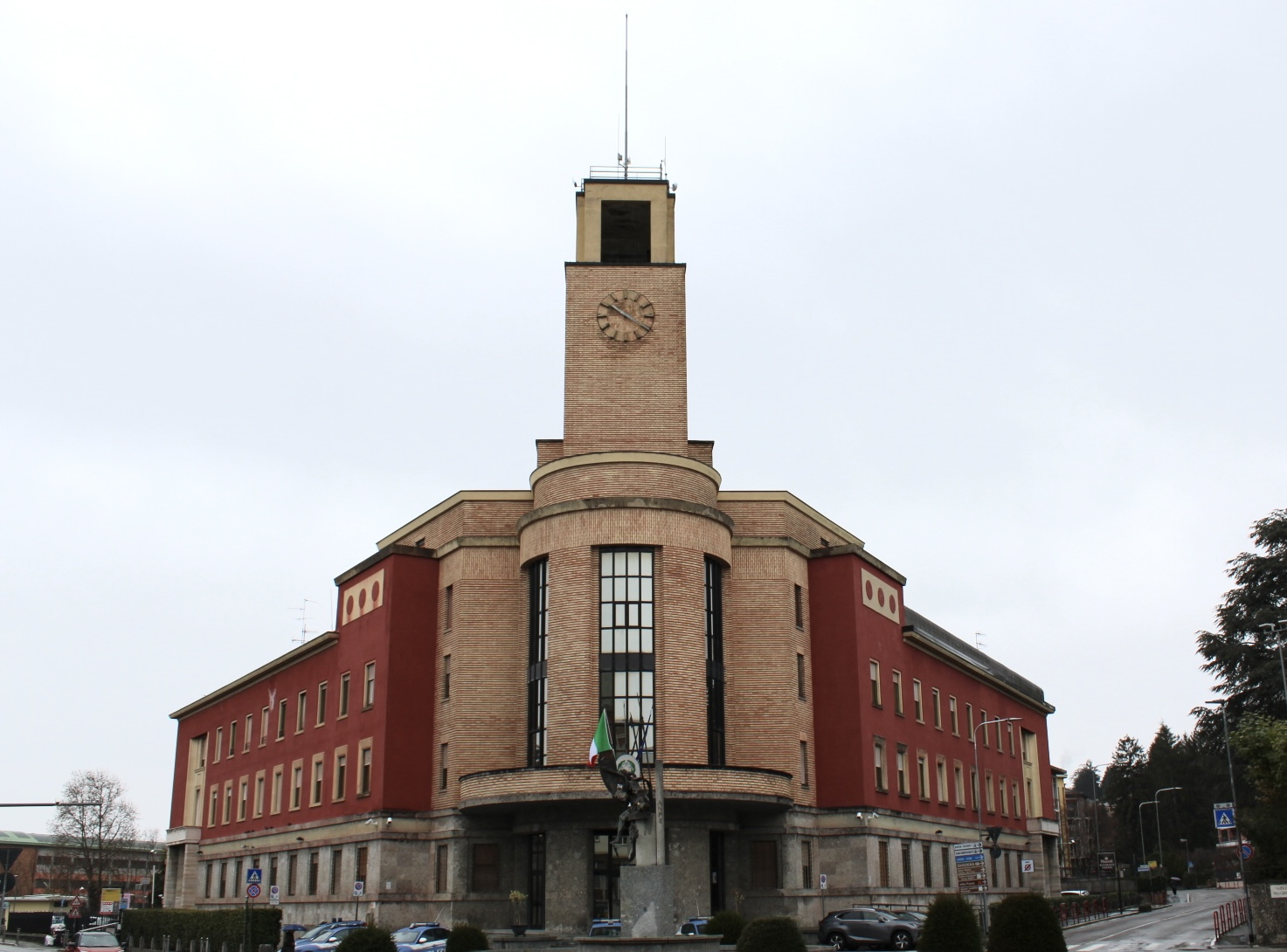
Main facade of former Casa del Fascio of Varese (now Questura) in 2023

The building serves as the police headquarters for the Province of Varese, symbolizing the repurposing of historical landmarks for the community, and integrating heritage and modern functionality.

== Fascist layout ==
The Casa del Fascio has 130 rooms of different sizes. Although the building regulations were not strict and evolved over the years, the building's layout transitioned over time from progressive to authoritarian and then to militaristic. These changes were influenced by decisions regarding religion, culture and foreign policy.

During the fascist era, the commander's office was located on the ground floor in the right wing. This area focused on the Volunteer Militia for National Security. On the ground floor in the left wing were the headquarters of the Associazione Mutilati e Combattenti, the Union of Manual and Intellectual Workers, building trade unions, and Cronaca Prealpina, the provincial party's newspaper, whose printing press was located in the basement.

The federal offices were located on the second floor as well as the Federal Secretariat and affiliated organisations. Among the trade unions located on the second floor were commercial, agricultural, industrial trade unions, as well as the headquarters of the Women's Federation and of Fascist University Groups.

The basement, beneath the Conference and Assembly Hall, accommodated various services to support the building's operations, and included storage rooms and a garage. The basement was spacious and reflected the simplicity of rationalist architecture.

The Conference and Assembly Hall was between the two wings of the building. It had two entrances: the front for people of authority and power, and the back for the public.

== Architecture ==
The Casa del Fascio's architecture is typical of Italian Rationalism, incorporating straight and curved lines and using features such as towers, balconies and memorials.

The materials used to create the structure were sourced from the local areas of Bergamo and Lake Iseo. The bricks consist of a Travertine band and jambs. The walls were plastered with terranova, a means of decorating used in the 1930s that created a polychrome effect. These materials were also used for their cheaper construction technique and a contemporary style.

The offices and conference room form an L-shape, creating an external space for outdoor activities and small-scale assemblies, and providing a vantage point over the city. The clock tower serves as a visual architectural focal point, enhancing the building's character through its geometrical aesthetic and symmetry.

=== Fascist symbolism ===
To represent fascism, the Case del Fascio were decorated with "M"s in honor of Benito Mussolini, Italy's fascist dictator. Recalling the Roman Republic, architects would decorate Case del Fascio with an eagle with the Latin "DVX" (dux, Italian Duce) on it.

Fascist symbols have largely been removed from the Case del Fascio. The structures were repurposed as educational institutions, libraries or police stations.

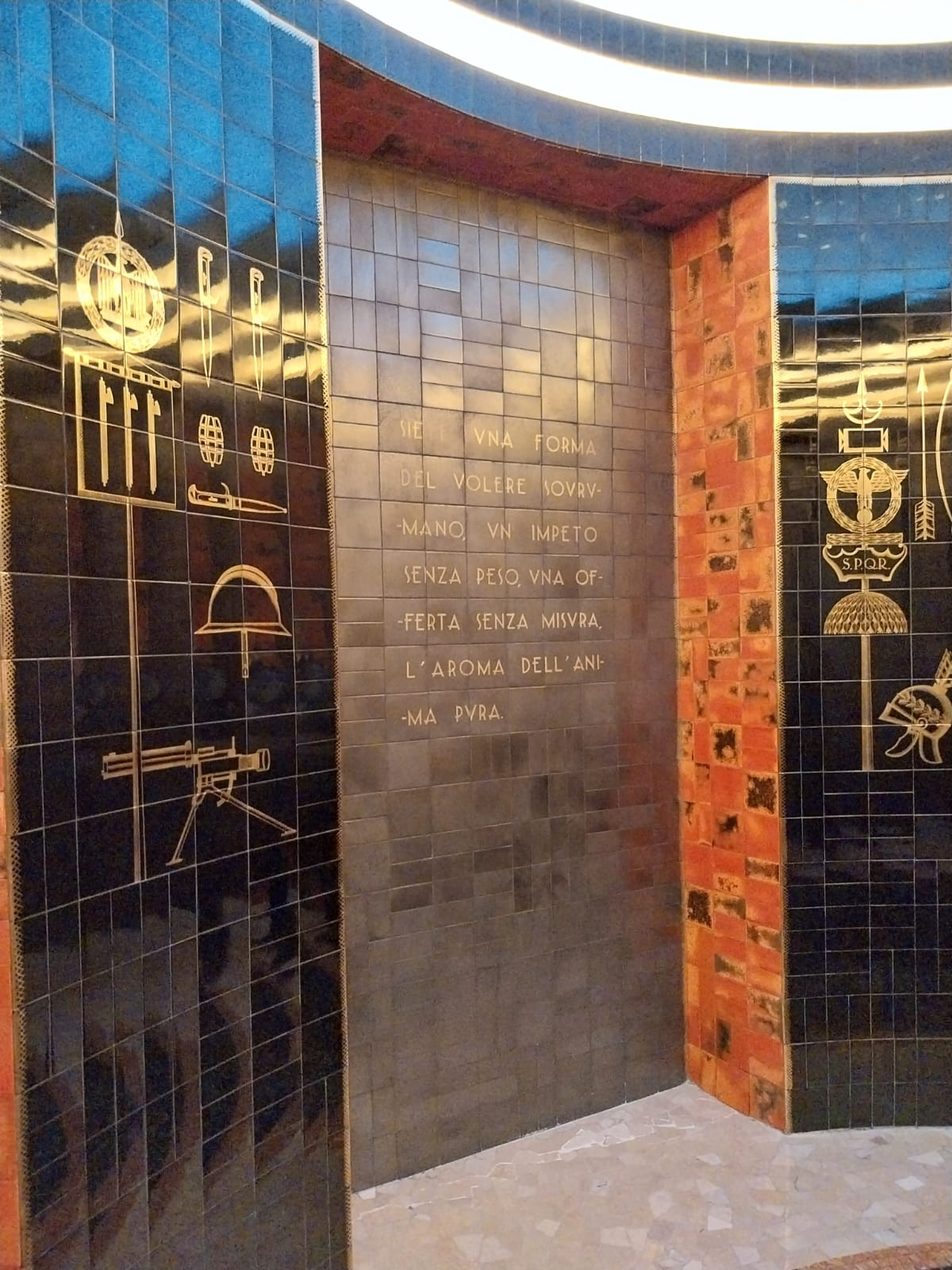
One side of the fascist sacrarium inside Casa del Fascio of Varese

=== Sacrarium ===
Varese's fascist sacrarium is the last surviving one in Italy. It is decorated with pure gold and polished black tiles. The design was created by the Italian Ceramic Society from Laveno Mombello with ceramicist Guido Andlovitz.

Quote written on the Sacrarium
Quotation	Translation
"Nel nome di Dio e dell'Italia, giuro di eseguire gli ordini del Duce e di servire con tutte le mie forze e, se necessario, col mio sangue, la causa della rivoluzione fascista."	"In the name of God and Italy, I swear to carry out the orders of the Duce and to serve with all my strength and, if necessary, with my blood, the cause of the fascist revolution."

=== La Vittoria Alata ===
The emblem "La Vittoria Alata" is situated on the pediment above the entrance to the office of the Police Commissioner, previously designated as the General Directory room,. Nike is represented with the 'Fasci', offering the laurel wreath to the unknown soldier painted on the left side.

At the bottom of La Vittoria Alata are written the dates of the Great War, the March on Rome, and the proclamation of the Italian Empire after the incorporation of Ethiopia. La Vittoria Alata was restored in 2006, when Police Commissioner Matteo Turillo decided to remove the concealing wallpaper. The fresco painting, depicting fascism's history, takes up the classical features and figurative language which were reinterpreted through the regime and its values.

=== Artistic exhibition ===
From 11 November 2022 to 10 June 2023, the exhibition "Art revealed in the Questura of Varese" showcased the art in the Casa del Fascio, including ornaments, marbles, and the embellishing inverted tips of the spears located along the main staircase. It exhibited the craftsmanship of the valuable wood used for the doors and windows of the building. The exposition established the foundation for the prospective role of the Questura as a museum to preserve the cultural and artistic heritage within the premises. The exhibition also displayed frescoes by Giuseppe Montanari, and the tools that were used during the painting process.

== See also ==
- Casa del Fascio (Bolzano)
- Casa del Fascio (Como)
- Questura
