= Cassero Senese =

14th-century fortification in Tuscany, Italy

- Grosseto, Tuscany, Italy
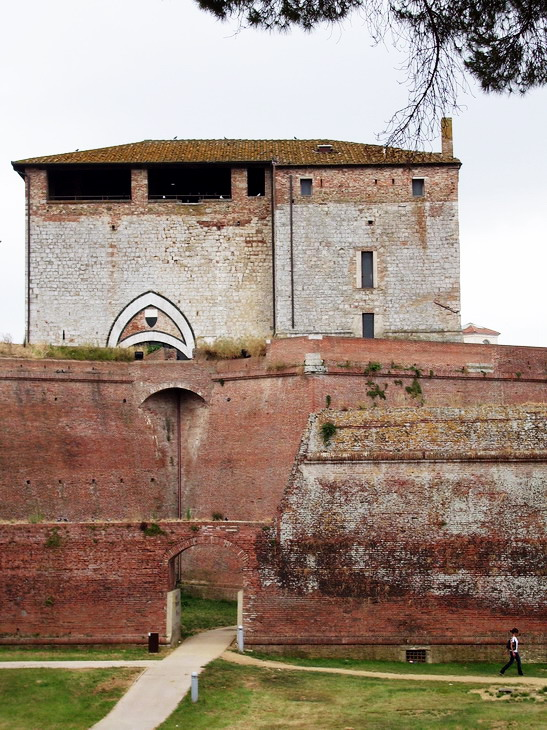
- The keep incorporated in the Bastione Fortezza

Site information
- Type: Keep
- Owner: City of Grosseto
- Open to the public: Daily
- Condition: Well-preserved or intact

Location
- Coordinates: 42.761756°N 11.116467°E

Site history
- Built: 1345
- Built by: Republic of Siena
- Materials: Stone

The Cassero Senese (English: Sienese Keep) is a 14th-century fortification located in Grosseto, Tuscany, Italy.

Built by the Republic of Siena, it survived the demolition of the Sienese fortifications ordered by Cosimo I de' Medici, Grand Duke of Tuscany in 1565 and was incorporated in the Bastione Fortezza (Fortress Bastion) of the Grosseto city walls.

== History ==
Together with Porta Vecchia, the Cassero Senese is the only medieval element of the Grosseto walls that was preserved during the 16th-century reconstruction of the fortifications. For many centuries it represented the central structure of the city's defensive system. From the mid-19th century until the Second World War, the building housed the Military District of Grosseto. In the final decades of the 20th century, restoration and renovation works were carried out, allowing for the recovery and reuse of the entire structure.

== Description ==
The Cassero Senese is a low but imposing rectangular tower clad in travertine. The 16th-century terrace at the top is covered and features a brick parapet. On the outer side of the walls, facing the modern ring road, are the black-and-white coat of arms of Siena and a distinctive double arch, with a pointed Gothic arch set above a lower round arch. These architectural details are decorated with travertine and black marble. The double gate once formed the medieval Porta di Santa Lucia, which served as an access point into the historic center of Grosseto.

== Present use ==
Today, the Cassero Senese is primarily used as an exhibition space for art and photography. It regularly hosts events such as the annual Festival Resistente, held on April 25 to mark Italy's Liberation Day.

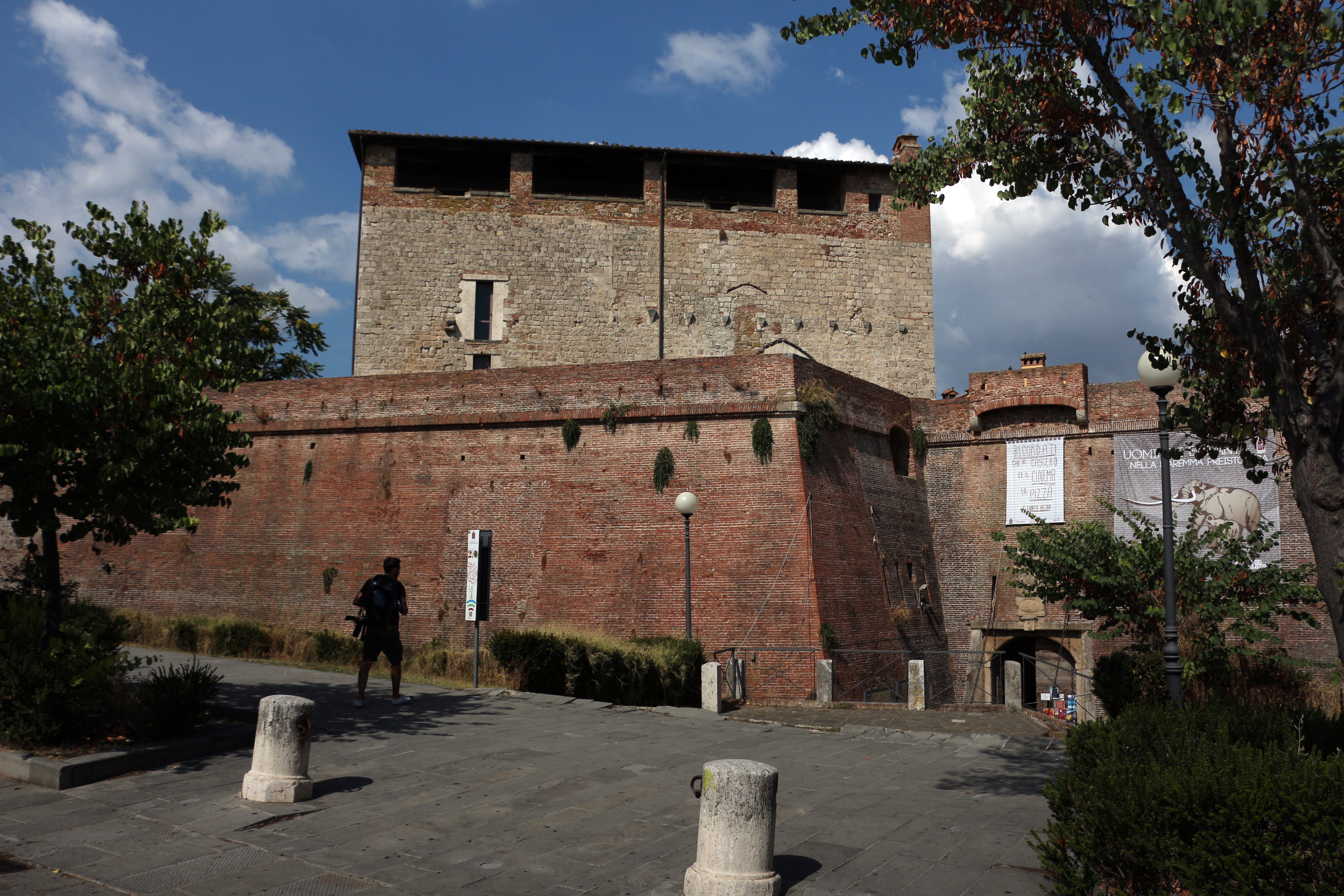
The entrance with the drawbridge

== Sources ==
- Beranger, Eugenio Maria (1987). Fonti per lo studio delle mura di Grosseto dal 1767 al 1950 (PDF). Rome: Paleani Editore. Archived from the original (PDF) on 2020-03-28.
- Boschi, Mariano (2014). Grosseto e le sue mura. Ghezzano: Felici Editore.
- Polito, Concetta; Marri, Alessandro; Perin, Luca (1990). Le mura di Grosseto. Rilievi e studi per il recupero. Florence: Alinea Editrice.
- Giorgio Spini (1983). "I Medici e l'organizzazione del territorio". Storia dell'arte italiana. Momenti di architettura. Turin: Giulio Einaudi. pp. 202–207.
