= Casa del Fascio (Grosseto) =

Building in Grosseto, Italy

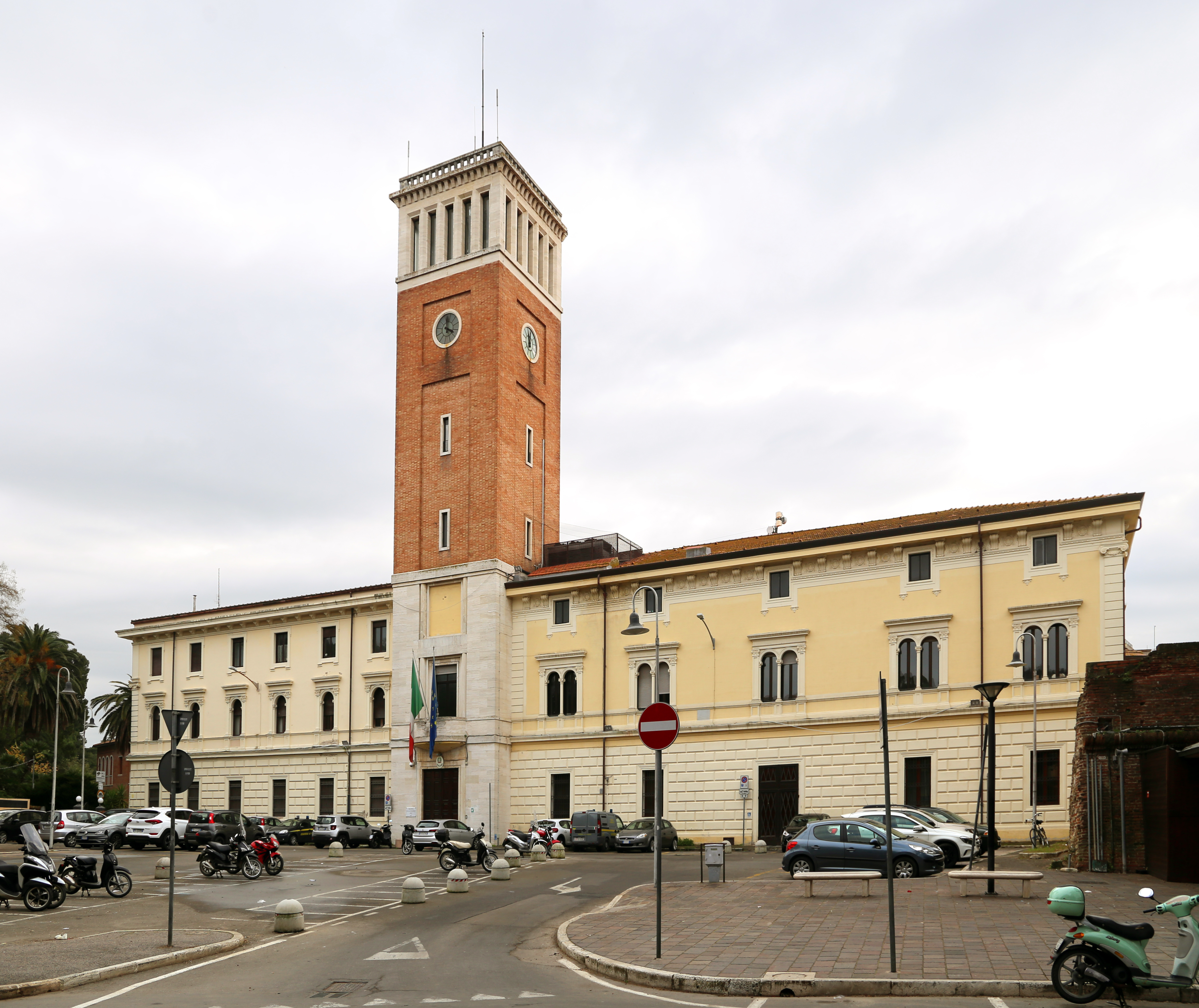
- Interactive map of the Casa del Fascio area

General information
- Architectural style: Eclectism; Rationalism
- Location: Piazza del Popolo 1 Grosseto, Tuscany
- Coordinates: 42°45′45.55″N 11°06′48.55″E
- Construction started: 1925
- Completed: 1939
- Opened: 1927; 99 years ago
- Client: National Fascist Party
- Owner: Guardia di Finanza

Design and construction
- Architects: Renato Della Rocca, Ugo Giovannozzi

The former Casa del Fascio (Fascist House), also known as Palazzo Littorio, is located in the center of Grosseto, in Piazza del Popolo.

The building is a hybrid example of eclecticism and Italian Rationalism typical of the Fascist era. It forms the southern side of Piazza del Popolo, situated between the Rimembranza Bastion and the Porta Nuova gateway. The site where the building stands was once crossed by a section of the Medicean walls of Grosseto, which were demolished between 1939 and 1941. It currently houses the Grosseto headquarters of the Guardia di Finanza.

== History ==
The design for the Casa del Fascio in Grosseto was proposed in 1925 by engineer Renato Della Rocca, with the building officially inaugurated in 1927. It exemplified the eclectic style and architectural elements characteristic of early 20th-century. In 1929, Della Rocca also designed the adjacent Corporations' Building, maintaining the same architectural language.

The building acquired its final form in 1939 when a new wing was constructed to unite the two original structures, crowned by a monumental tower in Rationalist style, created by Ugo Giovannozzi. Between 1939 and 1941, a segment of the city walls was demolished, integrating the structure more seamlessly with the Piazza del Popolo, which was then dedicated to the "Martyrs of Fascism".

In the post-war period, the building was repurposed as the headquarters of the Guardia di Finanza.

== Description ==
The building features a rectangular layout, prominently distinguished by its massive square-section tower, which makes it easily recognizable.

Inside, the focal point is a striking central staircase that splits at the mezzanine level. The two new flights extend laterally within a square-shaped area. The most prominent room, the "Salone delle Bandiere" (Flags' Room), served as the venue for assemblies of the National Fascist Party.

== Bibliography ==
- Grosseto fuori Porta Nuova. Lo sviluppo di Grosseto a nord delle mura dalla metà dell'Ottocento al secondo dopoguerra. Grosseto: Innocenti Editore. 2009.
- Letizia Franchina, ed. (1995). Tra Ottocento e Novecento. Grosseto e la Maremma alla ricerca di una nuova immagine. Soprintendenza per i beni ambientali e architettonici per le province di Siena e Grosseto.
- Innocenti, Mario; Innocenti, Elena (2005). Grosseto: briciole di storia. Cartoline e documenti d'epoca 1899-1944. Grosseto: Innocenti Editore.
- Mariagrazia Celuzza; Mauro Papa, eds. (2013). Grosseto visibile. Guida alla città e alla sua arte pubblica. Arcidosso: Edizioni Effigi.
- Enrico Crispolti; Anna Mazzanti; Luca Quattrocchi, eds. (2005). Arte in Maremma nella prima metà del Novecento. Milano: Silvana Editoriale.
