= Villa Recalcati =

Historical building in Varese, Italy

Coordinates: 45.816885°N 8.812859°E

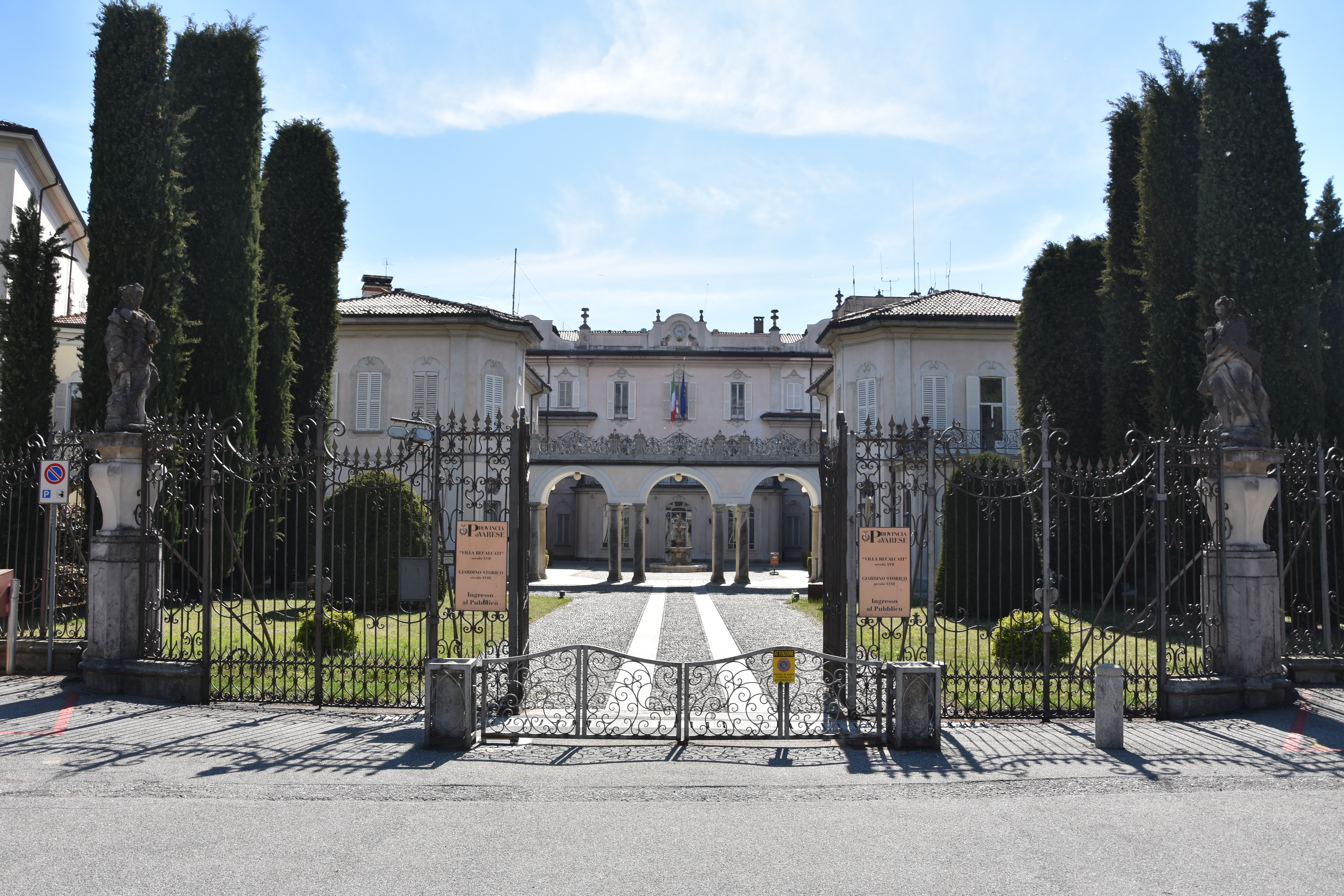
Villa Recalcati in Varese, Italy

Villa Recalcati is a Baroque palace in Varese, in the neighborhood Casbeno, in Italy. It is the headquarter of the Province of Varese and one of the two locations of the Prefecture of Varese.

Villa Recalcati was built in the first half of the eighteenth century next to an existing structure by Marquis Milanese Gabrio Recalcati, heir to an ancient lineage which was also part of Francesco Recalcati, Secretary of Ludovico il Moro.

Antonio Luigi Recalcati commissioned an enlargement of the structure between 1756 and 1776. The villa's illustrious guests included composer Giuseppe Verdi.

At the beginning of the 20th century, the villa and its grounds were purchased by Giacomo Limido, Gerolamo Garoni, and Eugenio Maroni Biroldi that transformed the building in the Varese's Grand Hotel Excelsior. Varese in 1927 became the capital of the Province and in 1931 the provincial institution bought the entire building.
