= Walls of Grosseto =

Brick wall in Grosseto, Tuscany, Italy

- Mura di Grosseto
- Grosseto, Tuscany, Italy
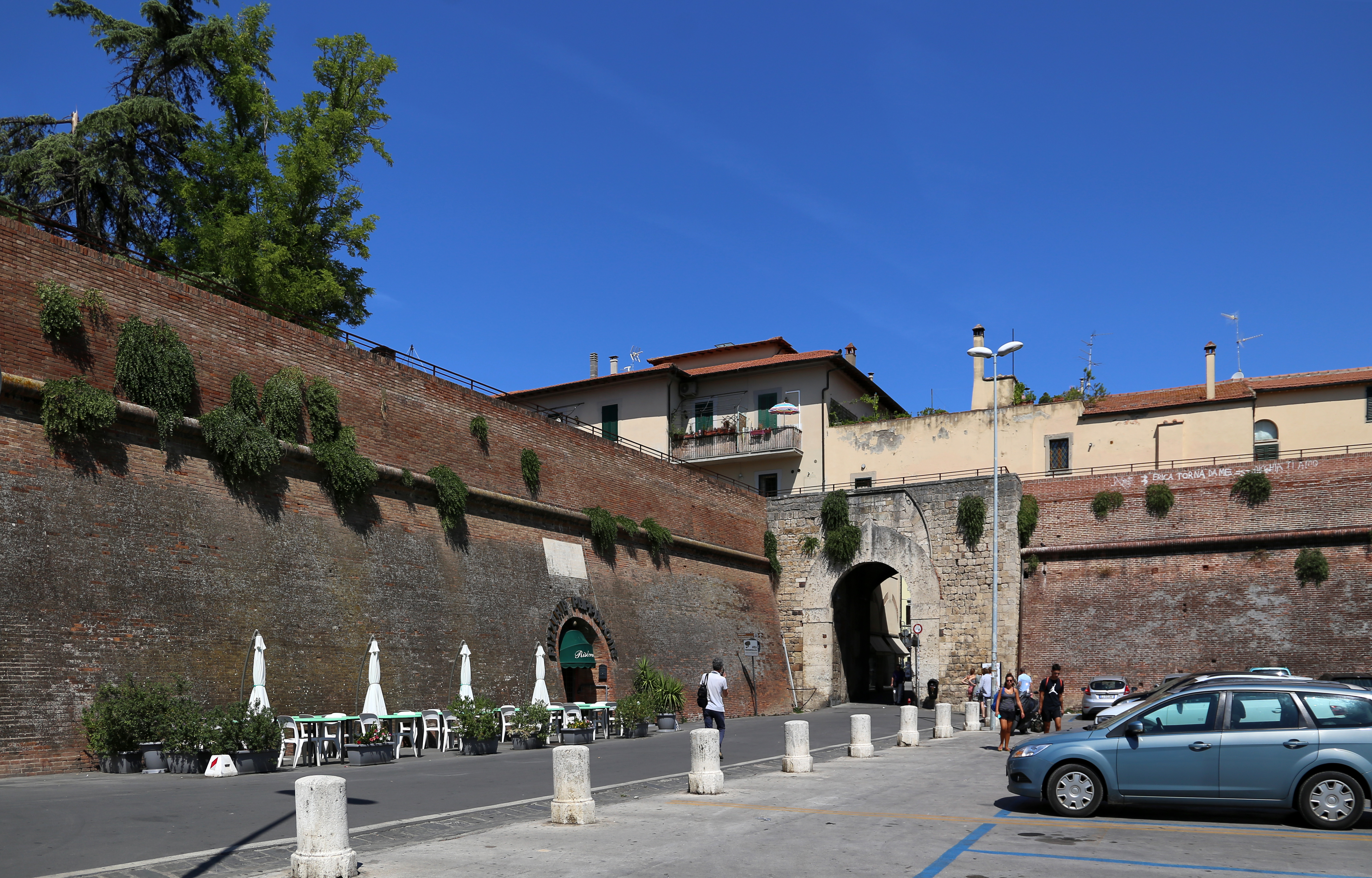
- Porta Vecchia

Site information
- Type: Defensive walls
- Owner: City of Grosseto
- Controlled by: Grand Duchy of Tuscany (1565–1859)
- Open to the public: yes
- Condition: Well-preserved or intact

Location
- Coordinates: 42.761806°N 11.1175°E

Site history
- Built: 1565–93
- Built by: Cosimo I de' Medici, Grand Duke of Tuscany; Architects involved: Baldassarre Lanci (1565–71); Marino Lanci (1571–74); Simone Genga (1574–82); Alessandro Pieroni (1587–93)
- Materials: Brick

The Walls of Grosseto (Italian: mura di Grosseto), known also as Medicean Walls (Italian: mura medicee), are a series of defensive brick walls surrounding the city of Grosseto in Tuscany, Italy.

The city walls, spanning approximately 3 kilometers, form a hexagonal shape and are a notable example of late-Renaissance bastion fort architecture, featuring six bastions (Rimembranza, Fortezza, Maiano, Cavallerizza, Molino a Vento, Garibaldi), a citadel, and gates.

The fortifications were commissioned by Cosimo I de' Medici, after the conquest of the Republic of Siena and its annexation to the Grand Duchy of Tuscany. The walls were designed by engineer-architect Baldassarre Lanci in 1564. Construction began in 1565 and was completed in 1593. During the 19th century, under the rule of Leopold II, the walkways of the walls were demilitarized and transformed into gardens and promenades.

The Renaissance walls of Grosseto incorporate two medieval structures from the old Sienese fortifications: Porta Vecchia and the Cassero Senese. The walls remain largely intact and are fully walkable, except for a brief section to the north where Porta Nuova was originally located.

== History ==
From its early days, the city of Grosseto was fortified, and by 953 it was documented as a "curtis cum castrum". At that time, the city had at least two defensive perimeters: a wooden fortification to protect the settlement and another stone fortification for the Aldobrandeschi castle.

The original fortifications of Grosseto, which were repeatedly dismantled after the city's submission to Siena in the 13th century, have left no surviving remnants. The Sienese rebuilt the walls, constructing the Cassero Senese in 1345. The medieval city walls featured four gates: Porta Cittadina to the south, Porta di San Pietro to the north, Porta di Santa Lucia to the east near the Cassero Senese, and Porta di San Michele to the west.

After the annexation of the Republic of Siena into the Grand Duchy of Tuscany in the mid-16th century, Cosimo I de' Medici commissioned engineer Baldassarre Lanci to design and build a new city wall. Work on the project began in 1565 under Lanci's direction and continued for nearly thirty years, concluding in 1593. Upon Lanci's death, his son Marino took over the project until 1574, after which Simone Genga and later Alessandro Pieroni supervised its completion. During this period, other significant projects were also undertaken to ensure the city's water supply: a series of underground cisterns were built in the city center to collect rainwater and distribute it.

The new hexagonal walls were equipped with substantial defensive bastions at the corners, mostly in a pentagonal shape, each featuring guard posts―known as "garitte" or "casini"―at the outermost points. The Cassero Senese Citadel (Fortezza) was further protected by a pair of smaller inward-facing bastions. Today, service galleries, storage rooms, and smaller defensive structures are still preserved. The only entrance to the city was from the south, known as Porta Reale, later renamed Porta Vecchia. It was not until 1755, nearly two centuries later, that the northern gate, Porta Nuova, was opened. Until 1757, the walls were surrounded by an external moat and an earthen embankment.

Under Leopold II of Tuscany, nearly all of the small towers and most of the "garitte" were demolished in the first half of the 19th century. This work softened the walls' appearance and transformed the area into a public tree-lined promenade.

In 1933, Porta Corsica was opened to the west, towards the sea. Between 1939 and 1941, the Fascist municipal administration demolished a short section of the walls in the Porta Nuova area to expand the Casa del Fascio. In 1943, a bombing raid destroyed one of the last remaining "garitte", the Casino delle Palle, located on the Maiano Bastion and containing several frescoes.

== Bastions, or bulwarks ==
=== Rimembranza ===
The bastion Rimembranza ("Remembrance"), originally known as the Baluardo di San Francesco, occupies the northern corner of the walls near Porta Nuova. It was built between 1576 and 1577, close to the nearby convent of San Francesco, under the direction of Simone Genga. A monument to Giuseppe Garibaldi was erected there in 1884, though it was later moved elsewhere on the walls. In 1924 the bastion was redesigned as the Parco della Rimembranza, a memorial park dedicated to the fallen soldiers of the World War I, officially inaugurated in 1927. The area later gave its name to the bastion itself. Some of the underground galleries housed the municipal aquarium between 1993 and 2016.

=== Fortezza ===
The bastion Fortezza ("Fortress") occupies the north-eastern corner of the defensive circuit between the Rimembranza and Maiano bastions. Built between 1571 and 1593 as the final and most complex section of the Medici fortifications, it forms Grosseto's fortified citadel. The pentagonal structure incorporates the smaller bastions of Santa Lucia and Vittoria and encloses the medieval Cassero Senese, integrated into the later defensive system. Originally, the fortress featured corner sentry boxes and a monumental drawbridge entrance leading to an internal courtyard with military buildings and a well. Historically used as Grosseto's military district from the 19th century until World War II, the fortress complex has since undergone extensive restoration and redevelopment. Today, the former citadel functions as a cultural and exhibition venue hosting public events and local festivals.

=== Maiano ===
The bastion Maiano, originally known as the Baluardo delle Palle ("bastion of the balls"), is located at the south-eastern corner of the walls between the Fortezza and Cavallerizza bastions. It was the first bastion completed during the Medici reconstruction of the walls, finished in 1566 to a design by Baldassarre Lanci. Its original name derived from the Medici coat of arms displayed beneath a hexagonal sentry box. A military powder warehouse known as the Casino delle Palle was also built on the bastion. Between 1870 and 1872 the Maiano water reservoir, designed by Loresindo Pruneti, was constructed there as the terminal point of Grosseto's first aqueduct. The original Medici sentry box and adjacent military structures were destroyed during Allied bombings in World War II, although the marble Medici emblem survived.

=== Cavallerizza ===
The bastion Cavallerizza ("Equestrian"), originally known as the Baluardo dell'Oriolo, stands at the southern corner of the walls beside Porta Vecchia. Built between 1574 and 1575, it was designed by Lanci and completed under the supervision of Simone Genga. The bastion later took the name "Oriolo" (orologio in current Italian) from the clock tower once located above the gate. Because of its strategic position at the city's principal entrance, the bastion underwent numerous alterations over the centuries. In 1882, part of the bastion's left orillon was demolished to enlarge the space in front of the gate, making Cavallerizza the only bastion of Grosseto to lose its original arrowhead shape. During the late 19th and 20th centuries, the central area of the bastion was adapted for public events, including performances and open-air cinema screenings.

=== Molino a Vento ===
The bastion Molino a Vento ("Windmill"), originally known as the Baluardo di San Michele, is located at the south-western corner of the fortifications near Porta Corsica. It was built in 1571 and originally took the name San Michele, from the nearby medieval gate and church (both lost). In the 19th century it became known as Molino a Vento due to the presence of a windmill still recorded until 1823. A decorative fountain was added at the centre of the bastion, embellished in 1950 with bronze sculptures depicting Maremma's typical animals by Tolomeo Faccendi. Other additions include a Roman column placed in 1938 and removed in 2018, and a bronze bust of Giuseppe Mazzini by Ivo Pacini.

=== Garibaldi ===
The bastion Garibaldi, originally known as the Baluardo delle Monache, is located at the north-western corner of the walls near Porta Nuova. Constructed in 1577, it was designed by Lanci and completed under the direction of Genga. Its original name derived from the demolition of nearby religious buildings required for its construction. In 1930 it received the monument to Giuseppe Garibaldi by Tito Sarrocchi, transferred from another bastion, giving the structure its present name. During the 1930s the central area of the bastion was redeveloped as a leisure venue with the construction of the dance hall "Eden", later expanded during the Fascist period and modified again after the World War II.

== City gates ==
=== Porta Nuova ===
Porta Nuova ("New Gate") is the northern access point to the historic centre, created in a gap in the walls between the Garibaldi and Rimembranza bastions after the original gate was demolished in 1866. The site corresponds to the medieval Porta di San Pietro, the city's northern entrance who took its name from the nearby church of St. Peter. When the Medici rebuilt the fortifications in the 16th century, the gate was closed and absorbed into the new circuit. It was reopened in the mid-18th century as Porta Nuova following a petition from local residents and a project by engineer Edward Warren, quickly becoming the city's main entrance. In the 19th century the gate was progressively modified and finally demolished in 1866, when the current urban access was created with a widened opening in the walls and adjacent customs buildings.

=== Porta Vecchia ===
Porta Vecchia ("Old Gate") is the oldest surviving gate in the walls of Grosseto, originally the southern entrance to the medieval city (14th century). It was preserved and incorporated into the Medici fortifications in the 16th century, becoming the main city gate until the opening of Porta Nuova in the 18th century. The medieval tower above the gate was demolished in 1854 during the 19th-century transformation of the walls into public gardens. The gate still retains its double-arched structure and continues to provide access to the historic centre.

=== Porta Corsica ===
Porta Corsica is located in the south-western section of the walls, between the Cavallerizza and Molino a Vento bastions. It was built in 1933 on the site of a former medieval western gate (Porta di San Michele), which was demolished during the 16th-century Medici reconstruction. Today, it serves as the main regulated access point to the historic centre for both pedestrians and authorised vehicles within the traffic-limited zone.

== See also ==
- Bastion fort
- House of Medici

== Sources ==
- Beranger, Eugenio Maria (1987). Fonti per lo studio delle mura di Grosseto dal 1767 al 1950 (PDF). Rome: Paleani Editore.
- Boschi, Mariano (2014). Grosseto e le sue mura. Ghezzano: Felici Editore.
- Celuzza, Mariagrazia; Papa, Mauro (2013). Grosseto visibile. Guida alla città e alla sua arte pubblica. Arcidosso: Effigi.
- Enrico Crispolti; Anna Mazzanti; Luca Quattrocchi, eds. (2006). Arte in Maremma nella prima metà del Novecento. Milano: Silvana Editoriale.
- Polito, Concetta; Marri, Alessandro; Perin, Luca (1990). Le mura di Grosseto. Rilievi e studi per il recupero. Florence: Alinea Editrice.
- Giorgio Spini (1983). "I Medici e l'organizzazione del territorio". Storia dell'arte italiana. Momenti di architettura. Turin: Giulio Einaudi. pp. 202–207.
