= Death of Jesus (disambiguation) =

The death of Jesus refers to the crucifixion of Jesus.

The Death of Jesus may also refer to:

- The Death of Jesus, a 2019 novel by J. M. Coetzee
- The Death of Jesus, a 1963 book by Joel Carmichael
