= Cecil Pinsent =

British garden designer and architect (1884–1963)

- Born: Cecil Ross Pinsent; 5 May 1884; Montevideo, Uruguay
- Died: 5 December 1963 (aged 79); Hilterfingen, Switzerland
- Occupation: Architect
- Known for: Garden designs

Cecil Ross Pinsent FRIBA (5 May 1884 – 5 December 1963) was a British garden designer and architect, noted for the innovative gardens which he designed in Tuscany between 1909 and 1939. These imaginatively re-visited the concepts of Italian 16th-century designers.

== Biography ==
Cecil Ross Pinsent was born in Uruguay on 5 May 1884, at Montevideo, the son of Ross Pinsent (a businessman with railway interests) and Alice Pinsent. He studied architecture in Britain.

Between 1901 and 1906 he spent some time making topographic drawings of churches and houses in Britain and France; and by 1906 he was making similar drawings in Italy. He and his friend Geoffrey Scott, when touring Tuscany, met the American art historian, Bernard Berenson, and his wife, Mary Berenson. Berenson employed Scott as his librarian, and Pinsent assisted with work on Berenson's Villa I Tatti. Through Berenson, Pinsent gained access to a rich clientele, drawn from the English-speaking community in Tuscany. His clients included Charles Alexander Loeser, Charles Augustus Strong; Mrs Alice Keppel; Prince Paul of Yugoslavia; Lady Sybil Cutting and her daughter, the historian Iris Origo.

Pinsent began by making alterations to connoisseur Charles Alexander Loeser's Villa Torri Gattaia, in 1907; and went on to design gardens at Berenson's Villa I Tatti (1909–1914), Strong's Villa Le Balze (1911–1913), the Origos' La Foce (1927–1939) and Villa Capponi (from 1939). At Brdo Castle near Kranj, Pinsent created the gardens' baroque screen and plan for avenues and hedges.

From 1939 to the late 1950s Pinsent lived in Britain – apart from a short visit to Italy in 1944–5.

During this time in Italy, he worked on the restoration of villas and gardens damaged by the War.

In the late 1950s he settled in Switzerland.

Pinsent died on 5 December 1963, at Hilterfingen, Switzerland.

Some of Pinsent's drawings are held in London in the library of the Royal Institute of British Architects.

== Other sources ==
- B. Origo, La Foce - a garden and landscape in Tuscany (2001).
- M. Fantoni, H. Flores, J. Pfordresher, eds., Cecil Pinsent and his gardens in Tuscany: papers from the symposium, Georgetown University, Villa Le Balze ... (1999. Edifir, Florence) ISBN 88-7970-079-0
- E. Clarke, 'A Biography of Cecil Ross Pinsent, 1884–1963', in Garden History; 26:2 (1998 Winter), pp. 176–191
- V. Shacklock, D. Mason, 'Survey and investigation of a 20th-century Italian garden', in Garden History; 23:1 (1995 Summer), pp. 113–124 [on Villa Le Balze]
- V. Shacklock, D. Mason, 'Villa Le Balze ...', in Journal of Garden History; 15:3 (1995 Jul–Sep), p. 179–187
- P. Bowe, 'Designs on Tuscan soil', in Country Life; 184:27 (1990 July 5), pp. 90–95
- E. Neubauer, 'The garden architecture of Cecil Pinsent, 1884-1964', in Journal of Garden History; 3:1 (1983 Jan–Mar), pp. 35–48. Published online 2012
