= Elizabeth Rockefeller Strong =

Eldest daughter of JDR

- Rockefeller Strong c. 1889
- Born: Elizabeth A. Rockefeller; August 23, 1866; Cleveland, Ohio, U.S.
- Died: November 14, 1906 (aged 40); Cannes, France
- Education: Vassar College
- Spouse: Charles Augustus Strong (m. 1889)
- Children: Margaret Rockefeller Strong
- Parent(s): John D. Rockefeller; Laura Spelman Rockefeller
- Relatives: Rockefeller family

Elizabeth "Bessie" Rockefeller (August 23, 1866 – November 14, 1906) was the eldest child of Standard Oil co-founder John Davison Rockefeller (1839–1937) and school teacher Laura Celestia "Cettie" Spelman (1839–1915).

== Early life and education ==
Strong was born Elizabeth Rockefeller on August 23, 1866, in Cleveland, Ohio, the eldest of five children, to John D. Rockefeller, co-founder of Standard Oil, and Laura Celestia Spelman Rockefeller. She attended Vassar College from 1886 to 1888 as special student. Strong Hall, the school's first dormitory, was named in her honor in 1893 by her father who contributed $35,000 toward the expense of the construction.

== Personal life ==
On March 22, 1889, she married philosopher and psychologist Charles Augustus Strong and had one daughter:

- Margaret Rockefeller Strong (1897–1985), who married George de Cuevas, a Chilean ballet businessman.

They were residents of Lakewood, New Jersey. She died of a stroke in Cannes, France on November 14, 1906, at age 40, after a long illness.

== See also ==
- Rockefeller family
- John D. Rockefeller
- Vassar College
