= Villa Le Balze =

Villa in Tuscany, Italy

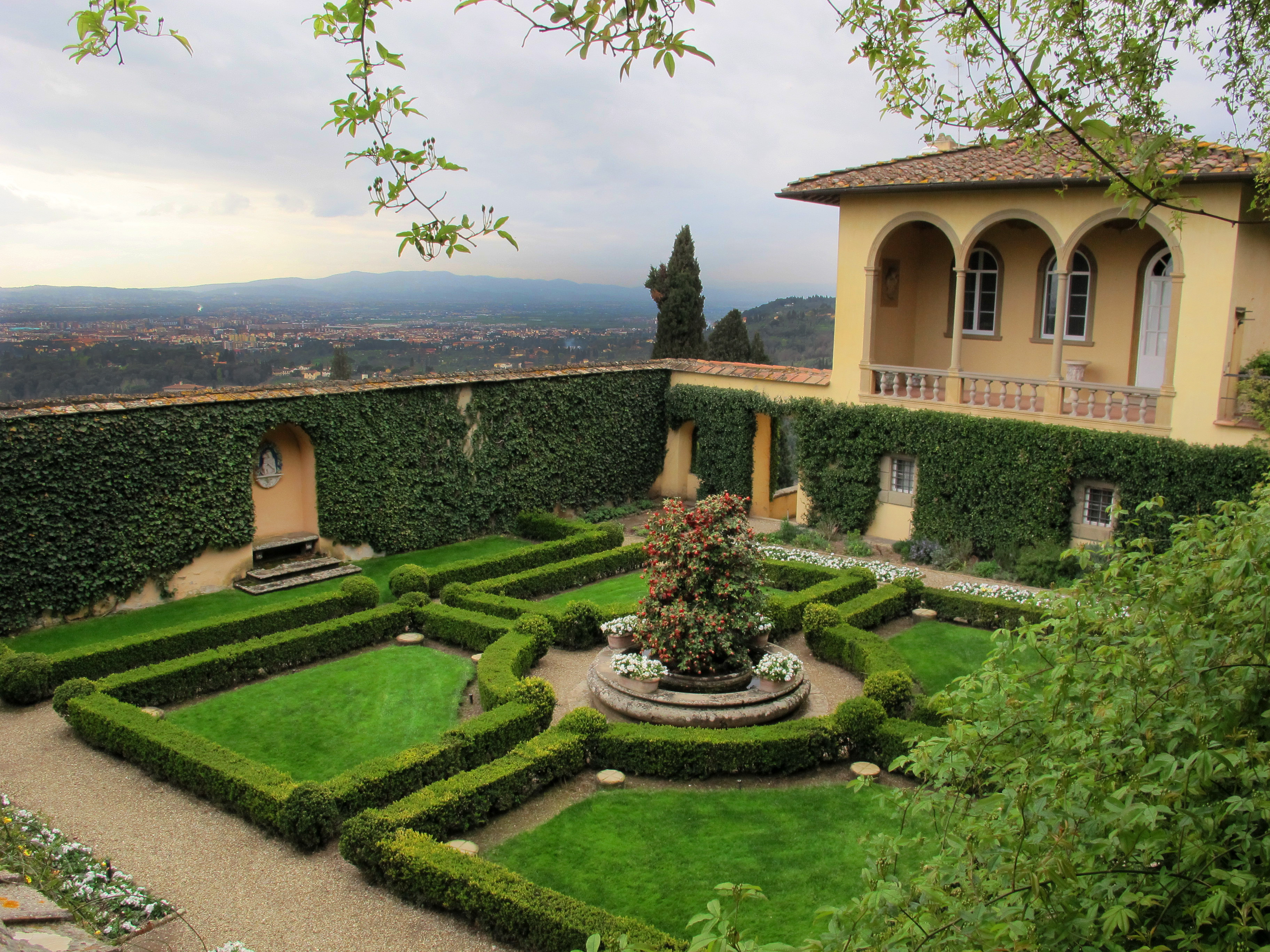
- Villa Le Balze and one of its formal gardens

General information
- Architectural style: Renaissance
- Location: Via Vecchia Fiesolana, 26, Fiesole, Tuscany, Italy
- Coordinates: 43°48′23.1″N 11°17′16.4″E
- Year built: 1912–1913
- Owner: Georgetown University

Design and construction
- Architects: Cecil Pinsent; Geoffrey Scott

Villa Le Balze is a garden villa in Fiesole, a comune of the Metropolitan City of Florence and the region of Tuscany in central Italy. The villa was commissioned and built by Charles Augustus Strong in 1913, where he spent much of his life. It was then embroiled in the fighting of the Second World War and came into the possession of Margaret Rockefeller Strong. The villa is today owned by Georgetown University and hosts year-round study abroad students focused on interdisciplinary study of Italian culture and civilization, as well as such other subjects as politics and history.

== History ==
=== During Strong's lifetime ===
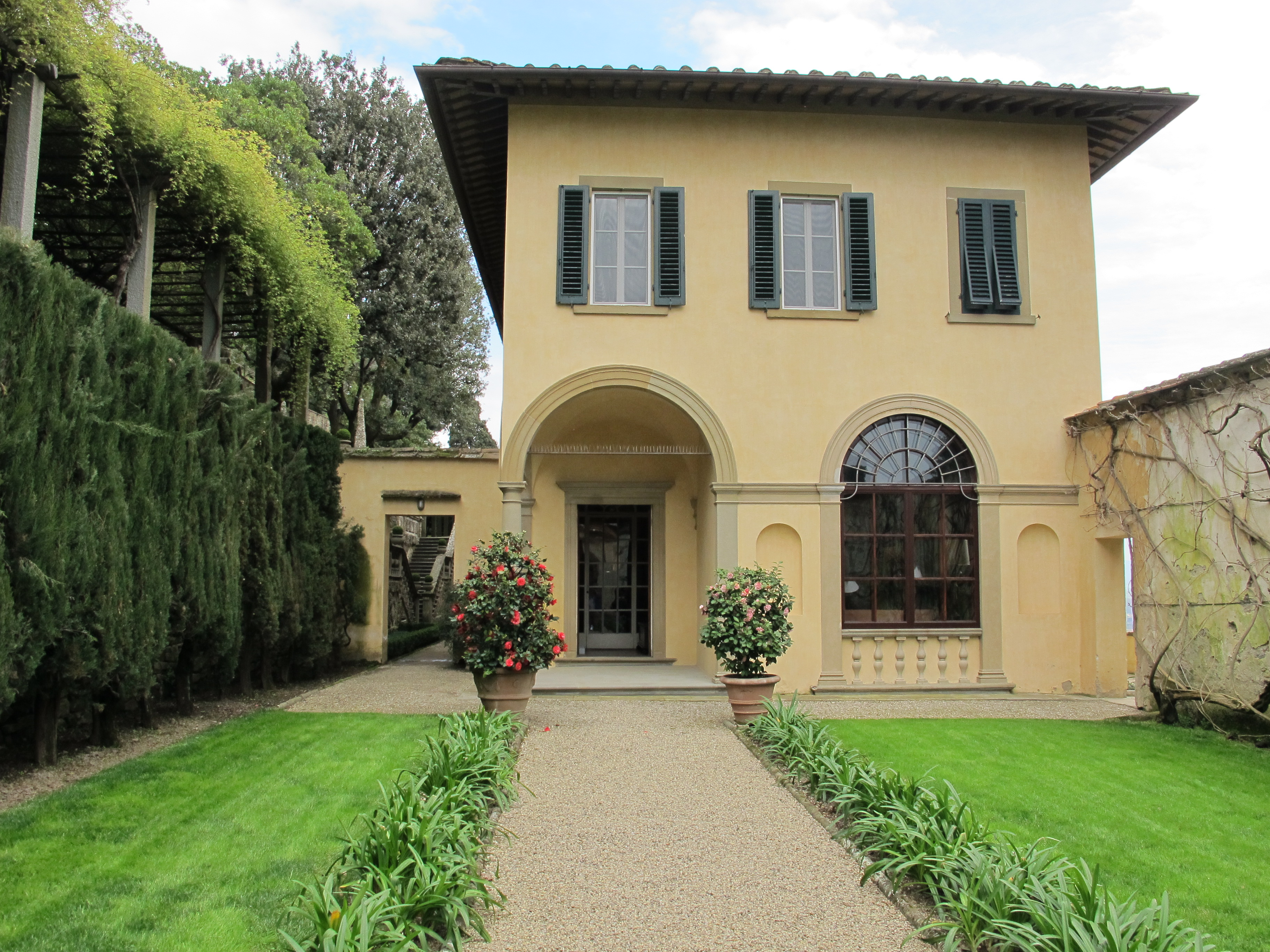
Rear of the villa

Villa Le Balze was planned in 1911 by English architects Cecil Pinsent and Geoffrey Scott for the American philosopher Charles Augustus Strong. It was built in a tight space among the Tuscan hills overlooking the city of Florence. Across the street, to the east, is the 15th century Villa Medici and to its north is Villa San Girolamo. Strong briefly stayed in Villa San Girolamo in 1911 and was impressed by its views of Florence, prompting him to build Villa Le Balze just below it on the hill. In Italian, balze means cliffs, referring the villa's physical situation, which in some areas rests on a 50 degree incline.

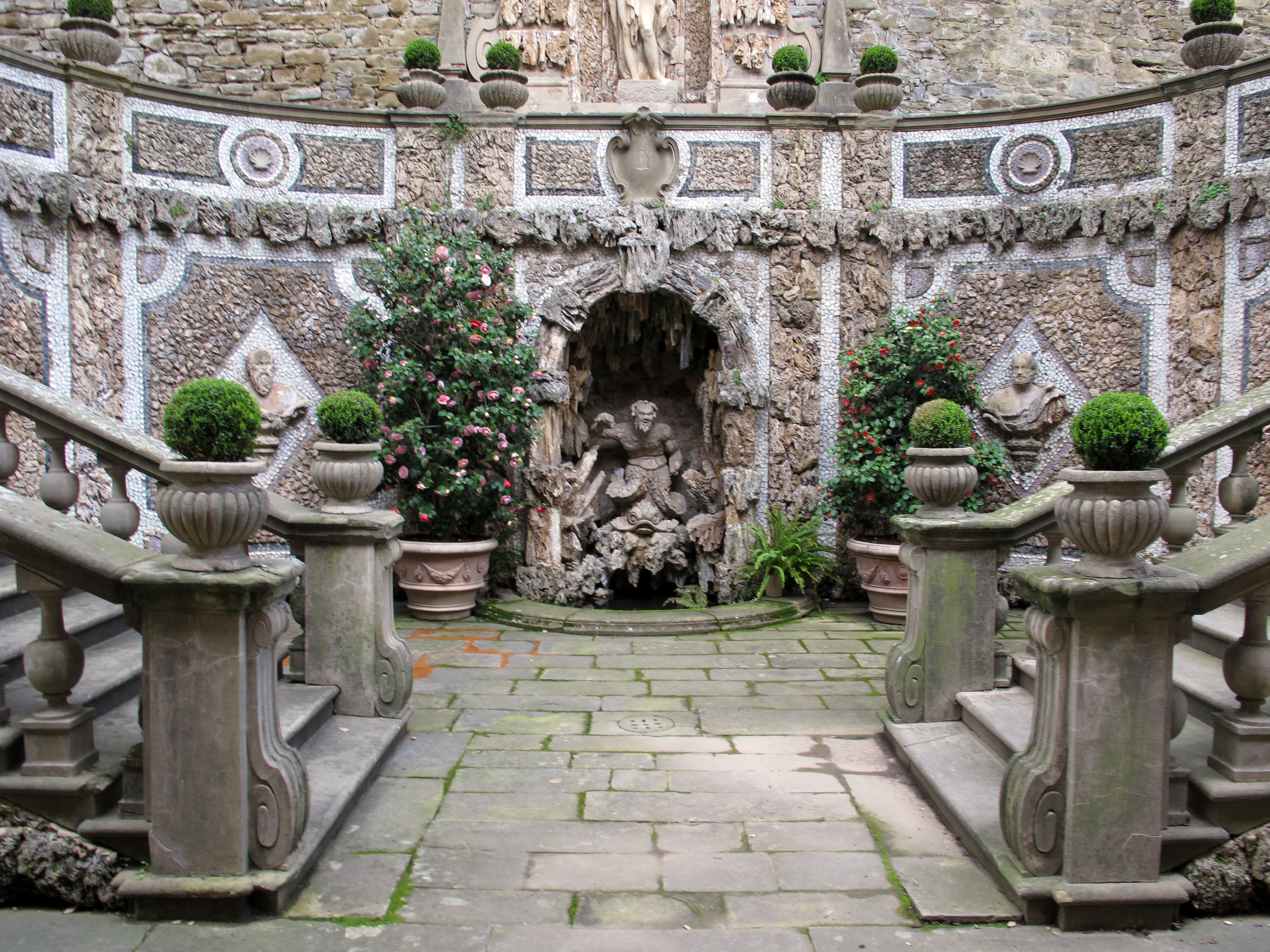
Fountain made of coral and seashells

Construction of the villa began in 1912. In order for the steep, narrow land to accommodate the villa, 1,200 tons of earth had to be removed from the site, which allowed the villa complex to be integrated into the hillside. A retaining wall was also built to support the main building as well as control runoff water, which could be stored and used to water the gardens. Bernard Berenson from Villa I Tatti and Strong's Harvard classmate George Santayana were on-site to observe construction. During the winter, a storm washed away part of the construction. It was completed in 1913 in the Renaissance architectural style along with its seven formal gardens.

Following the death of his wife, Elizabeth Rockefeller Strong, in 1906, Charles wrote six books and numerous philosophical essays in the form of letters at the villa. Plagued by loneliness in his later years, he hosted his philosopher colleagues at the villa, including his Harvard classmate, George Santayana. Many of the statues throughout the terrace gardens and villa depict the great philosophers, reflecting Charles' study during reclusion at the villa. The villa was joined with its neighboring villino to create the three-acre campus that it now is, including two acres of olive groves. Upon his death in 1940, Strong left the villa to his daughter Margaret Rockefeller Strong de Larrain.

=== During the Second World War ===
The villa was the subject of significant attention during the Second World War. Initially used as the main office of the Bank of Tuscany, the villa was seized by German forces and used as a military headquarters. Under the control of Nazi Germany, in 1944, the villa underwent bombardment by machine gun and artillery fire of the Allied forces, causing significant damage to the house and gardens. At one point, a German mortar shell penetrated the roof of the villa and became lodged without detonating in the library.

=== Academic center ===
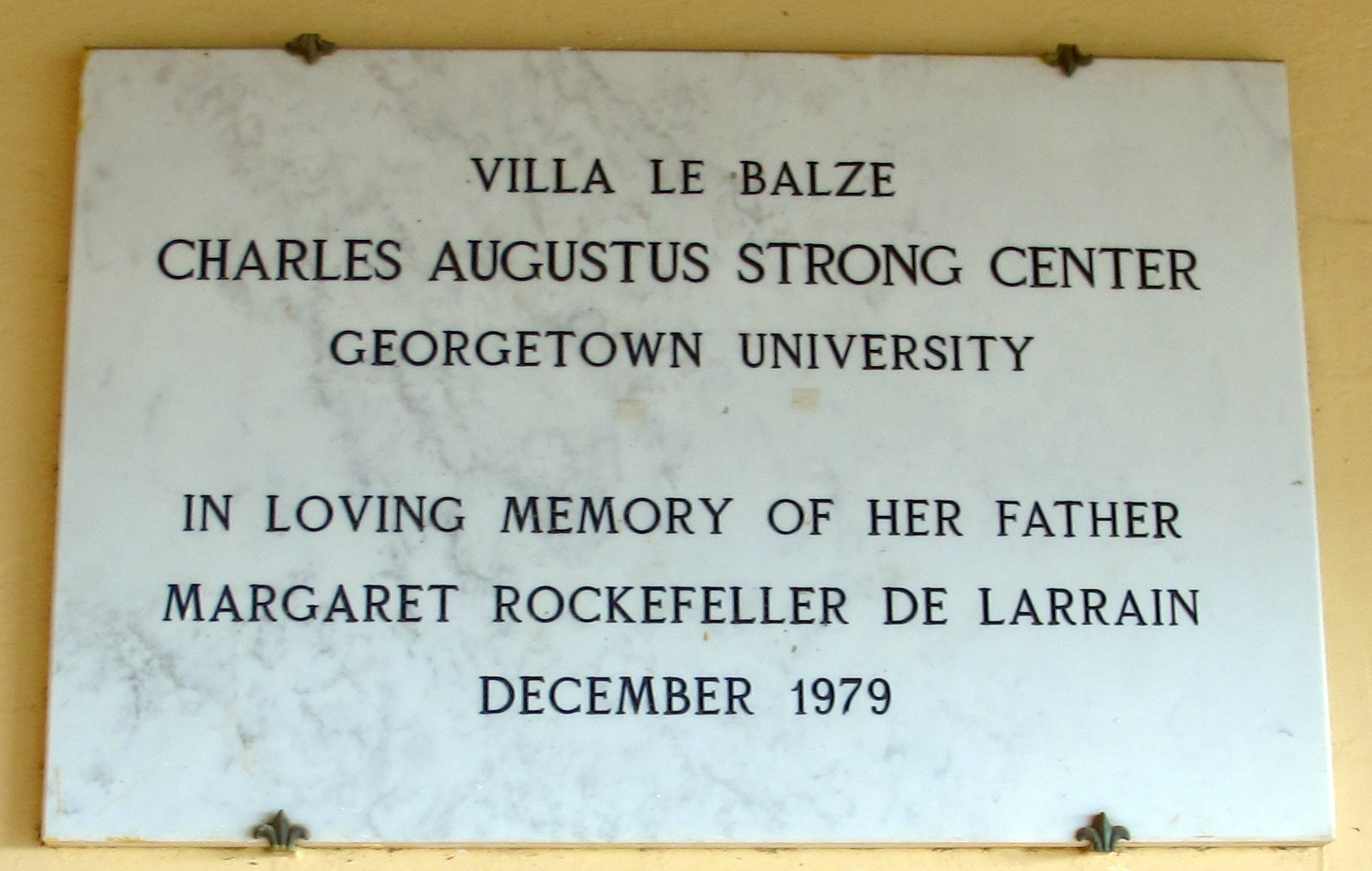
Marble plaque commemorating its academic purpose

Following the end of the war, Margaret retained the villa for 35 years by employing a minimal maintenance staff before gifting Villa Le Balze to Georgetown University in December 1979, where it would become the Charles Augustus Strong Center and would allow students to study Italian culture and history. Margaret's decision to donate the villa to Georgetown was the result of the provost of the university, Fr. J. Donald Freeze, S.J., who promised that the university would pay the fee to keep a light at her son's grave lit, as he had died and was buried in Fiesole. Upon its donation, Freeze was responsible for creating its academic programs and ran the program in 1991 upon resigning as provost.

Today, the villa hosts students during the academic year and the summer as well as faculty from the main campus of Georgetown University. A small contingent of faculty and staff, including cooks, permanently remain at the villa. It is able to house 20 students and accommodate 10 to 13 homestay students. In the course of a year, the villa hosts an average of 70 to 80 students. Due to its age and delicacy, the villa is continually undergoing a process of preservation and restoration by the university.

== Garden layout ==
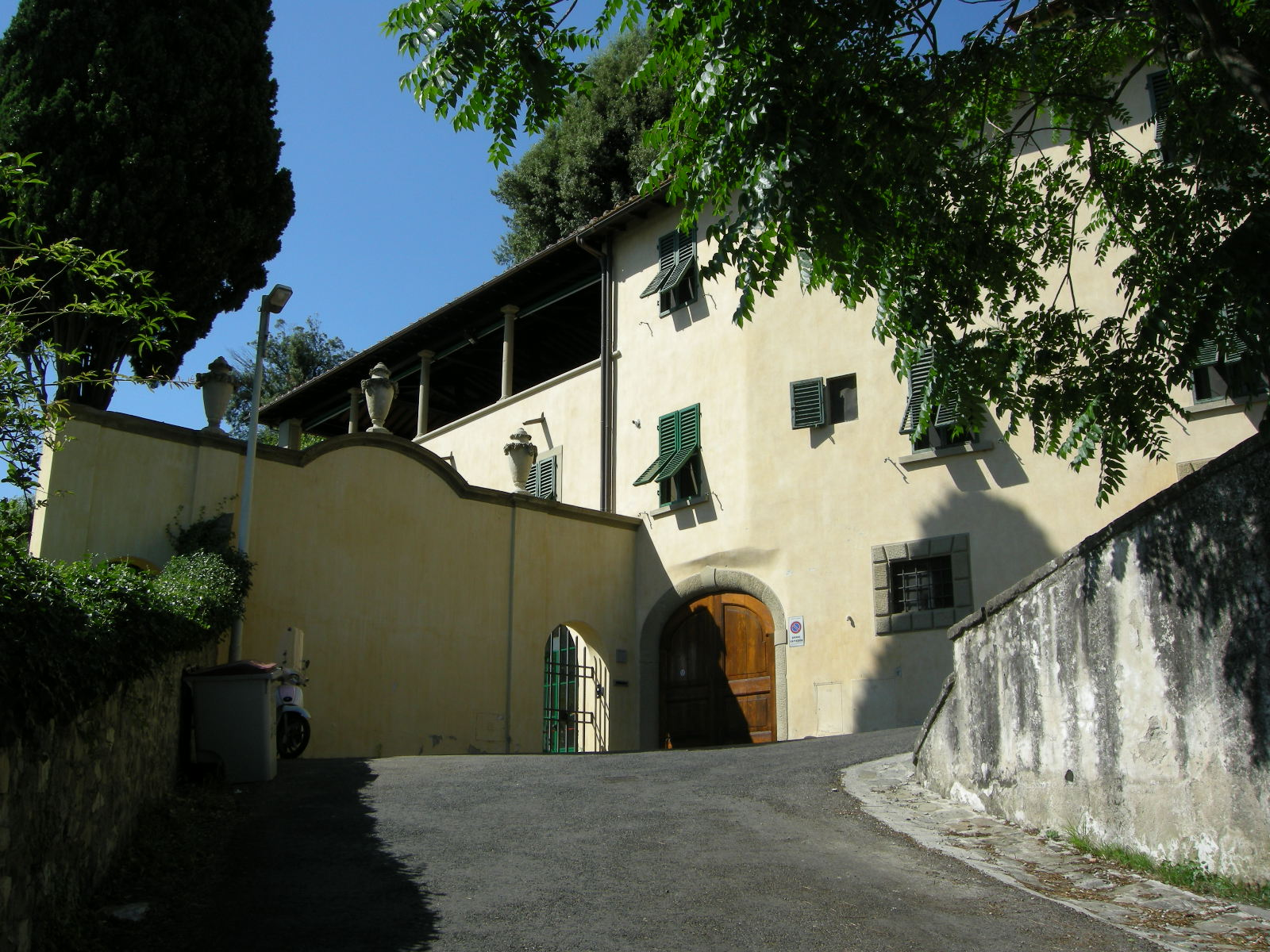
Gate attached to the villino, which is used as the main entrance today

Pinsent designed the gardens of Villa Le Balze to have a coherence and flow about them. To accomplish this, he had to depart from the traditional Italian Renaissance garden style of the 15th century due to the steep grade on which the villa was built and the narrow strip of land he had available to him. Pinsent drew inspiration for this accomplishment from the nearby Villa Gamberaia.

The primary gate used to enter the villa today was merely a side entrance during Strong's lifetime. Instead, visitors would enter through the more elaborate portal from the north, which take them into the villino's loggia and would allow them to proceed through the gardens and across the various levels as Pinsent intended.

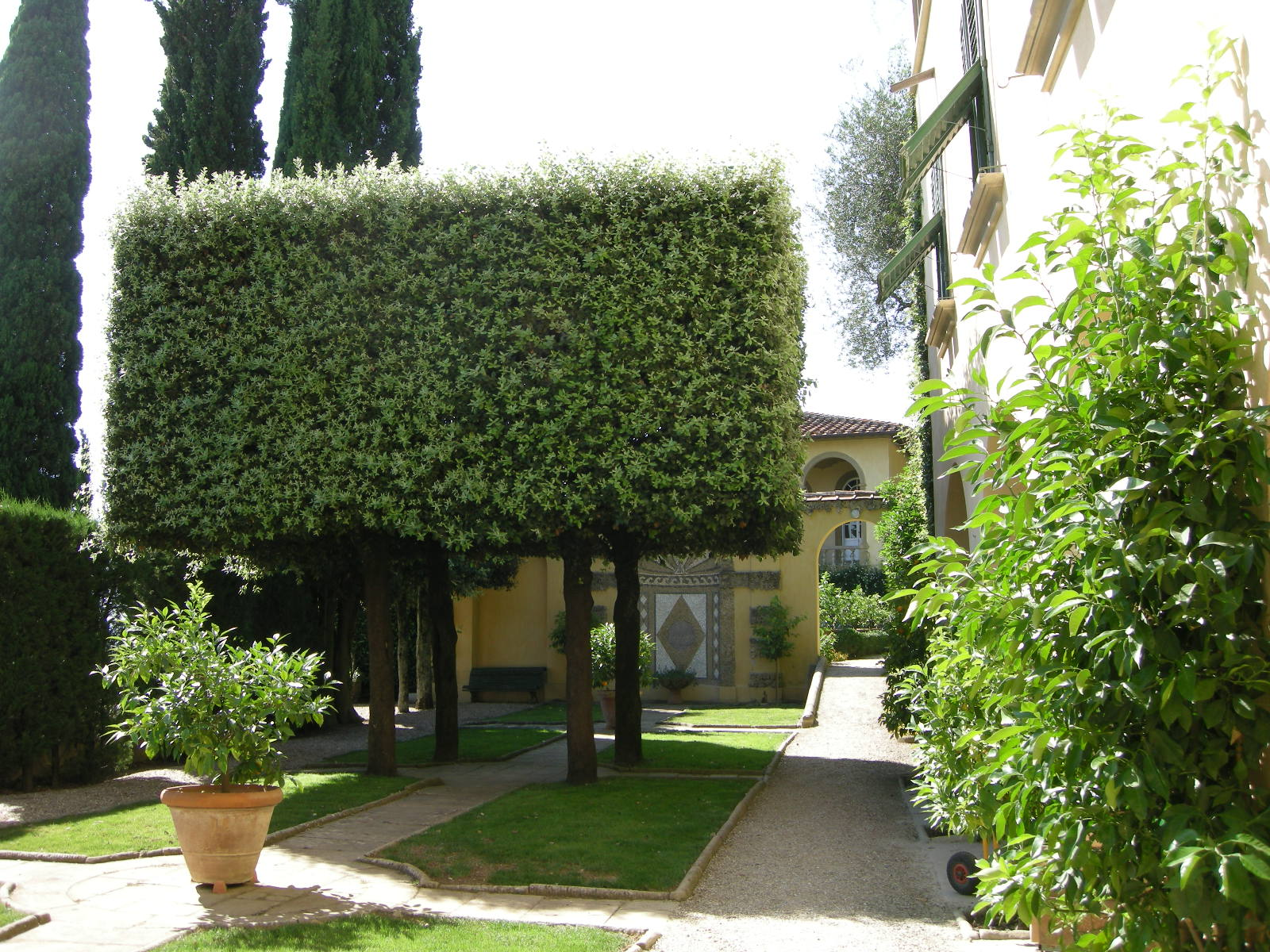
The orange garden

Upon entering through the villa's gate, one comes upon the orange garden. There, citrus trees were once planted, but were later replaced by ivy geraniums wrapped around metal nets. Proceeding then through two arches in the west wall, one enters the winter garden. This garden is organized along a formal layout, with it being divided into geometric shapes bordered by boxwood. In the center of this garden is a circular stone basin. Perennial and seasonal plants, potted lemon trees and jasmine, which covers the wall under the balcony, decorate this part of the garden.

This path continues past the villa building and ends in a grove of holm oaks planted in rows, which culminates in a rusticated grotto. Parallel to this path runs another bordered by iris, lavender, and roses, which separates the green space designed by Pinsent from the open countryside. A pergola of Lady Banks' roses allows one to enjoy a view of the garden from above. This pergola is reached by double-stepped stone stairs facing the north side of the villa.

Beside the villa is a cave decorated with coral and seashells and a fountain. On either side of the fountain are two pebble mosaic walls with four high reliefs depicting the busts of ancient philosophers. Above the fountain is a statue of Venus inside a niche in the wall.

This layout represented Pinsent's vision of gardens, in which one would be able to pass gradually from an architecturally organized space to the natural landscape of meadows and olive groves at its borders.

== Image gallery ==
Villa building
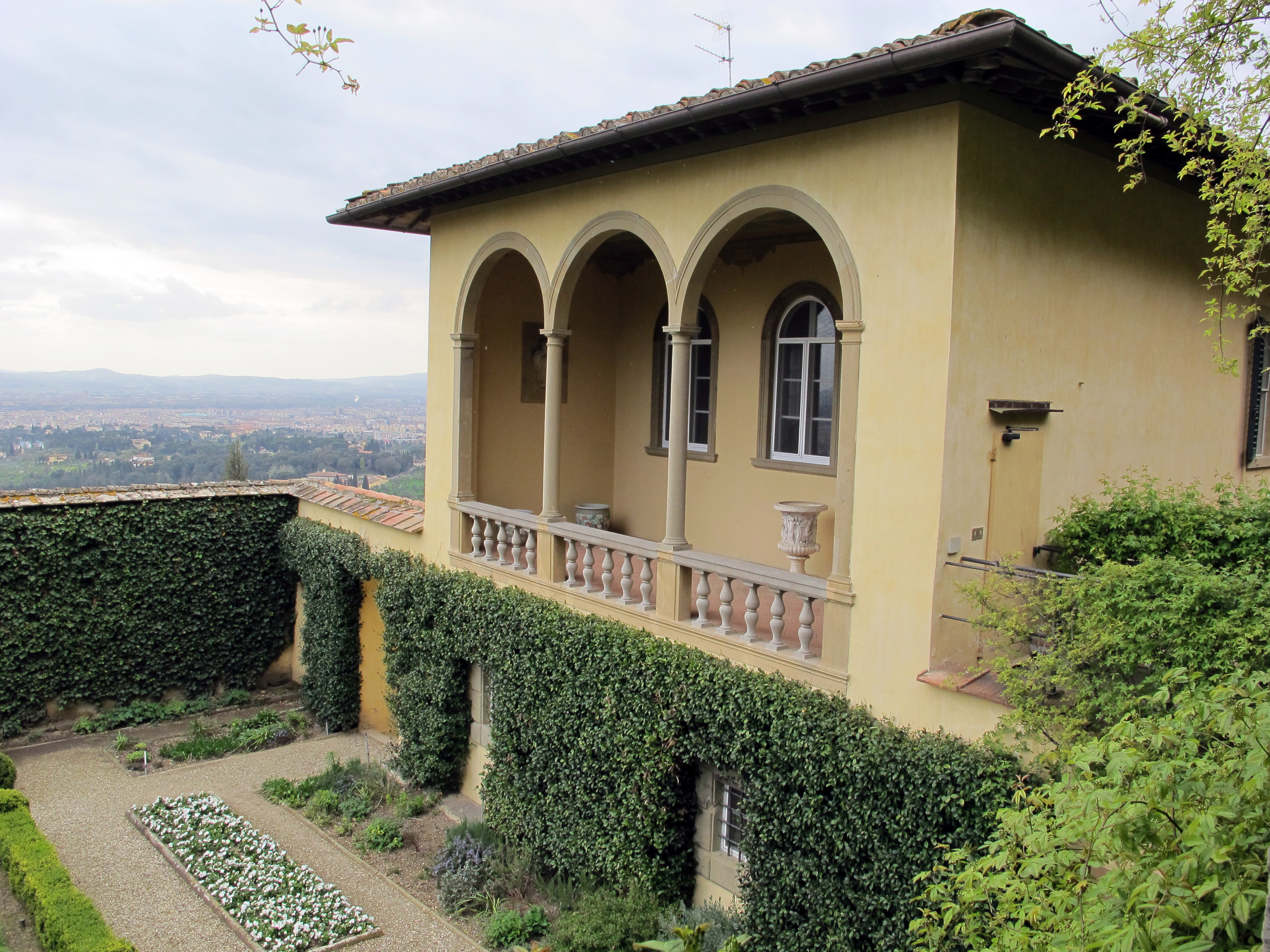
Loggia on the eastern side of the villa

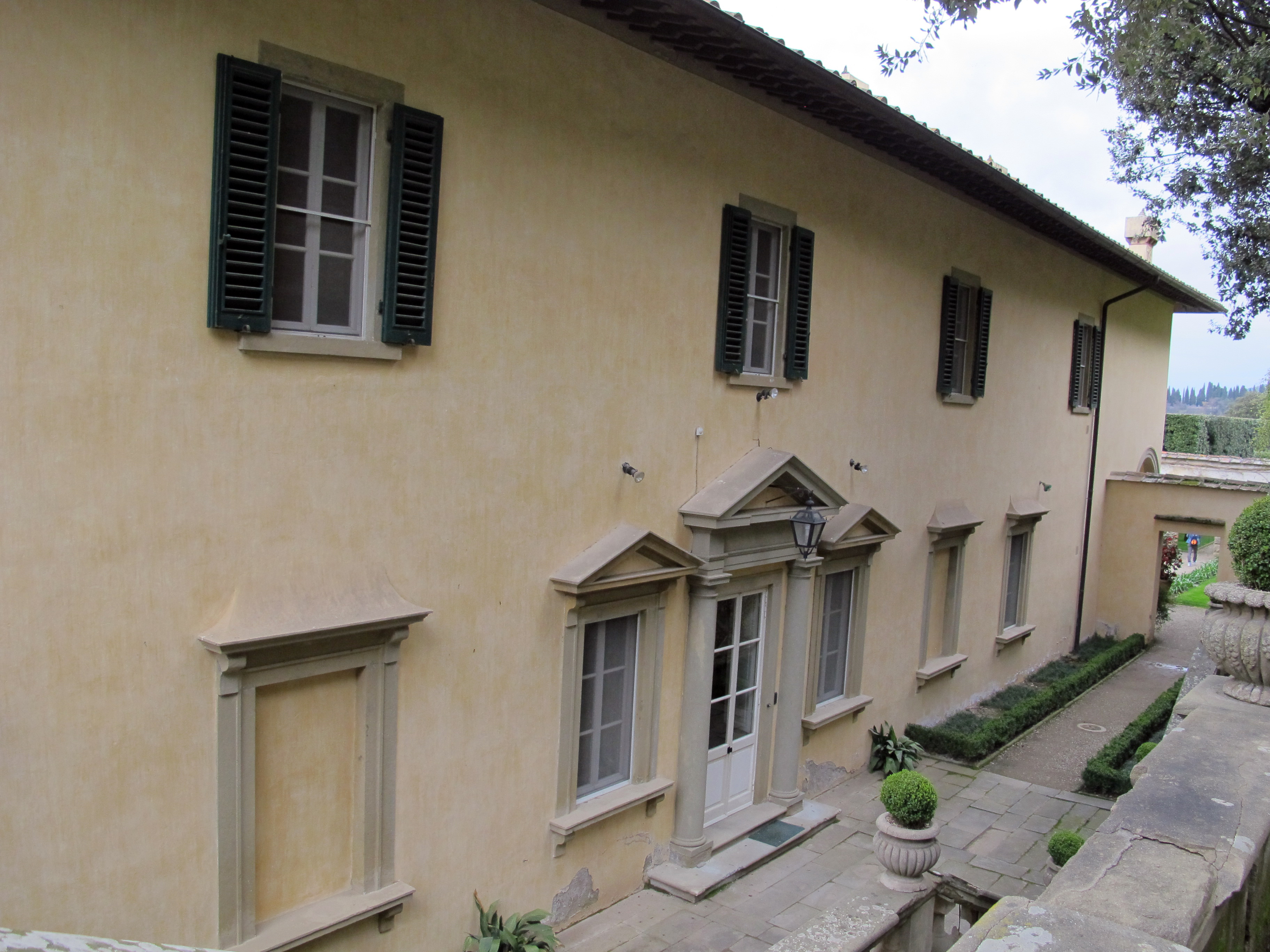
Northern side of the building

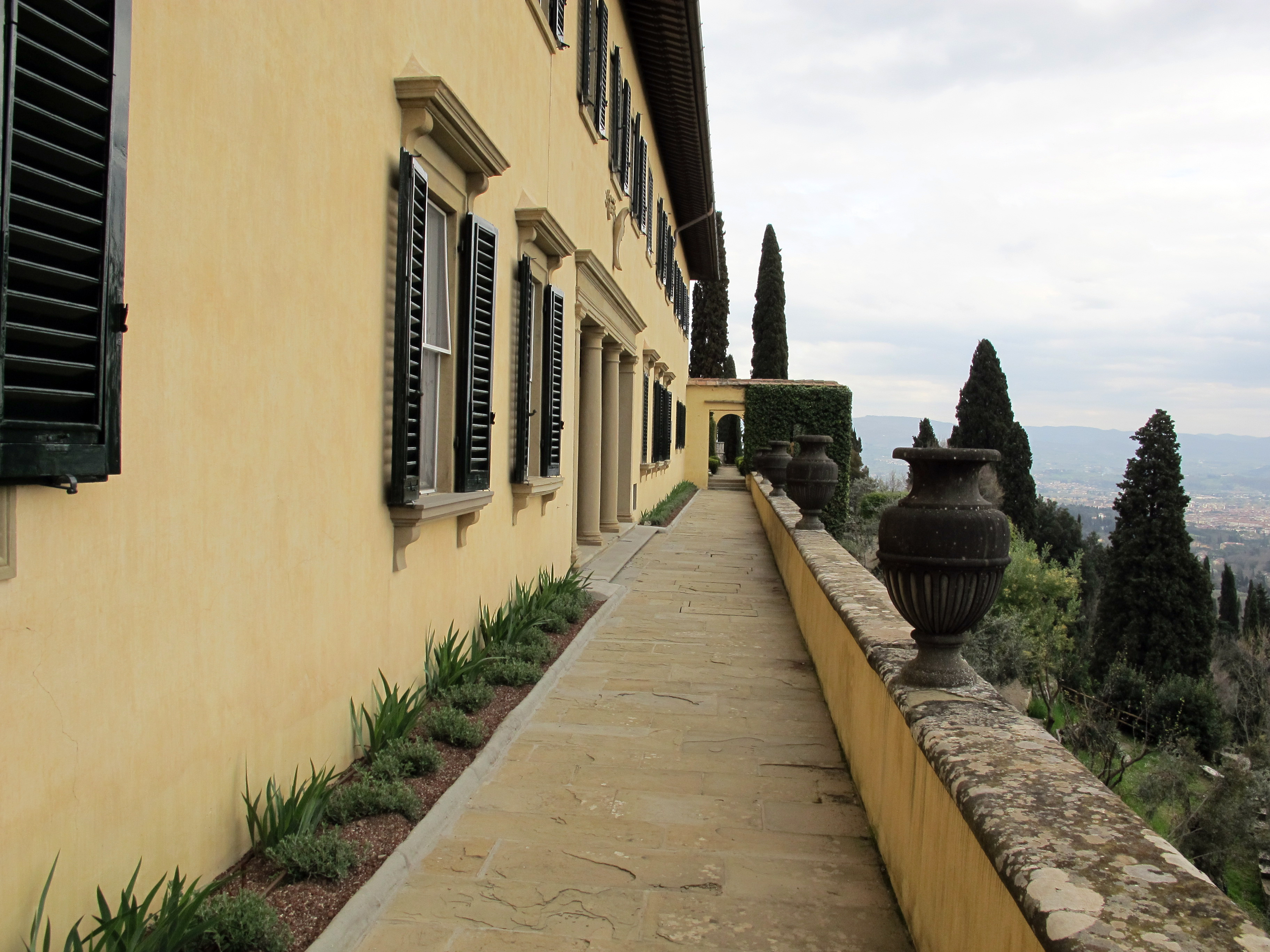
Southern side of the building overlooking Florence

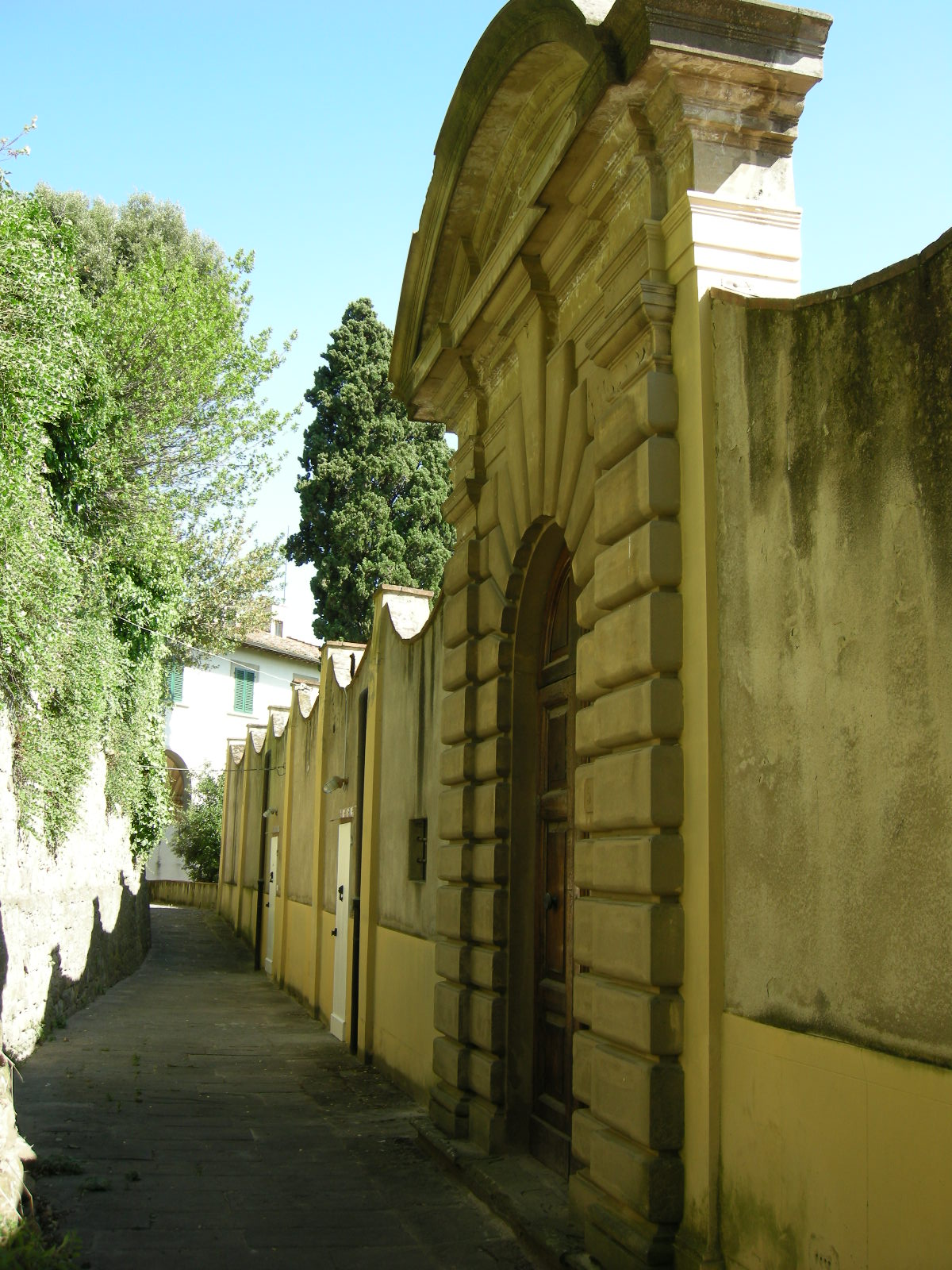
Original grand entrance to the villa

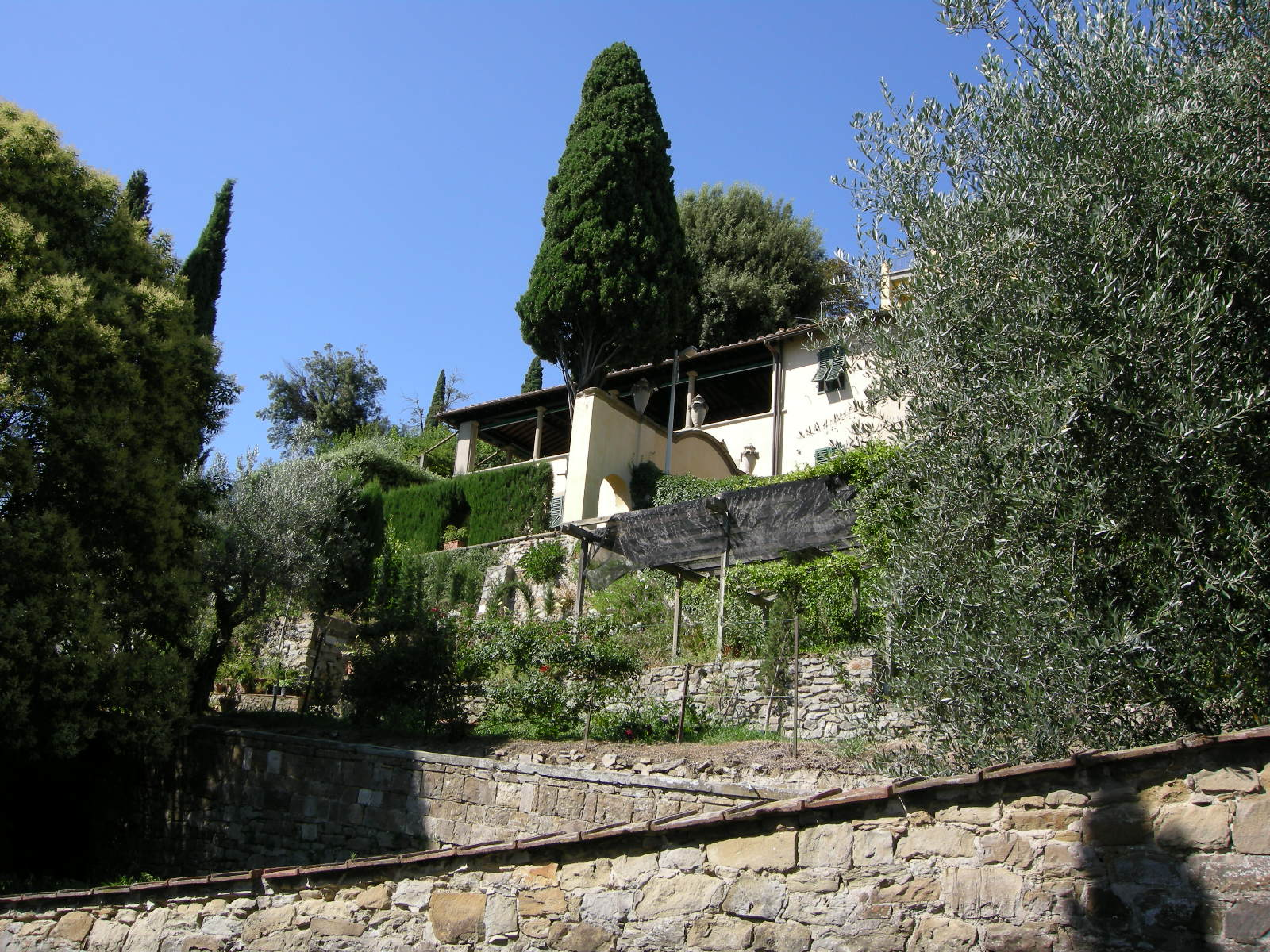
View of the villa from a lower terrace

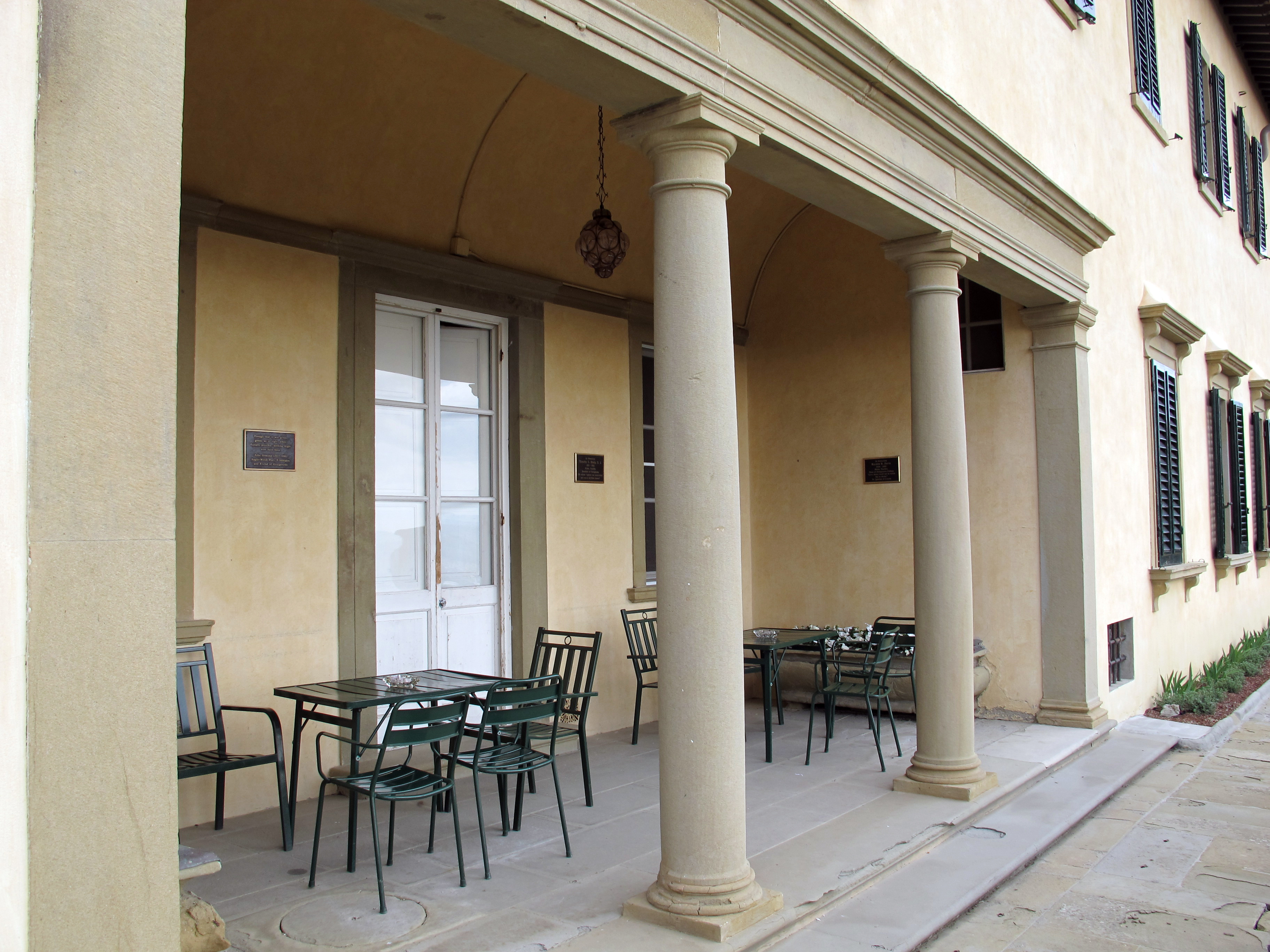
Portico on the southern side of the building

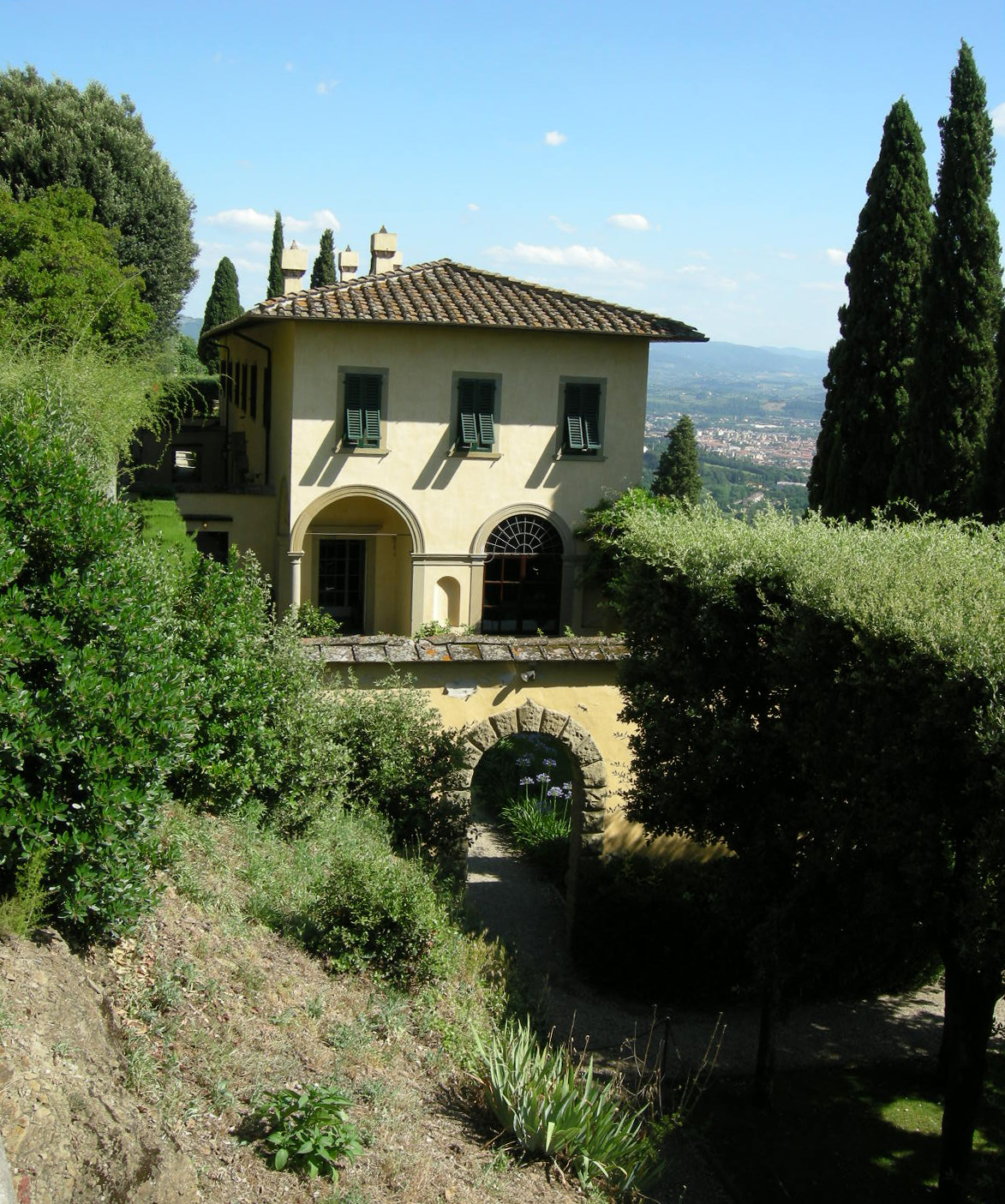
Rear of the villa on the west

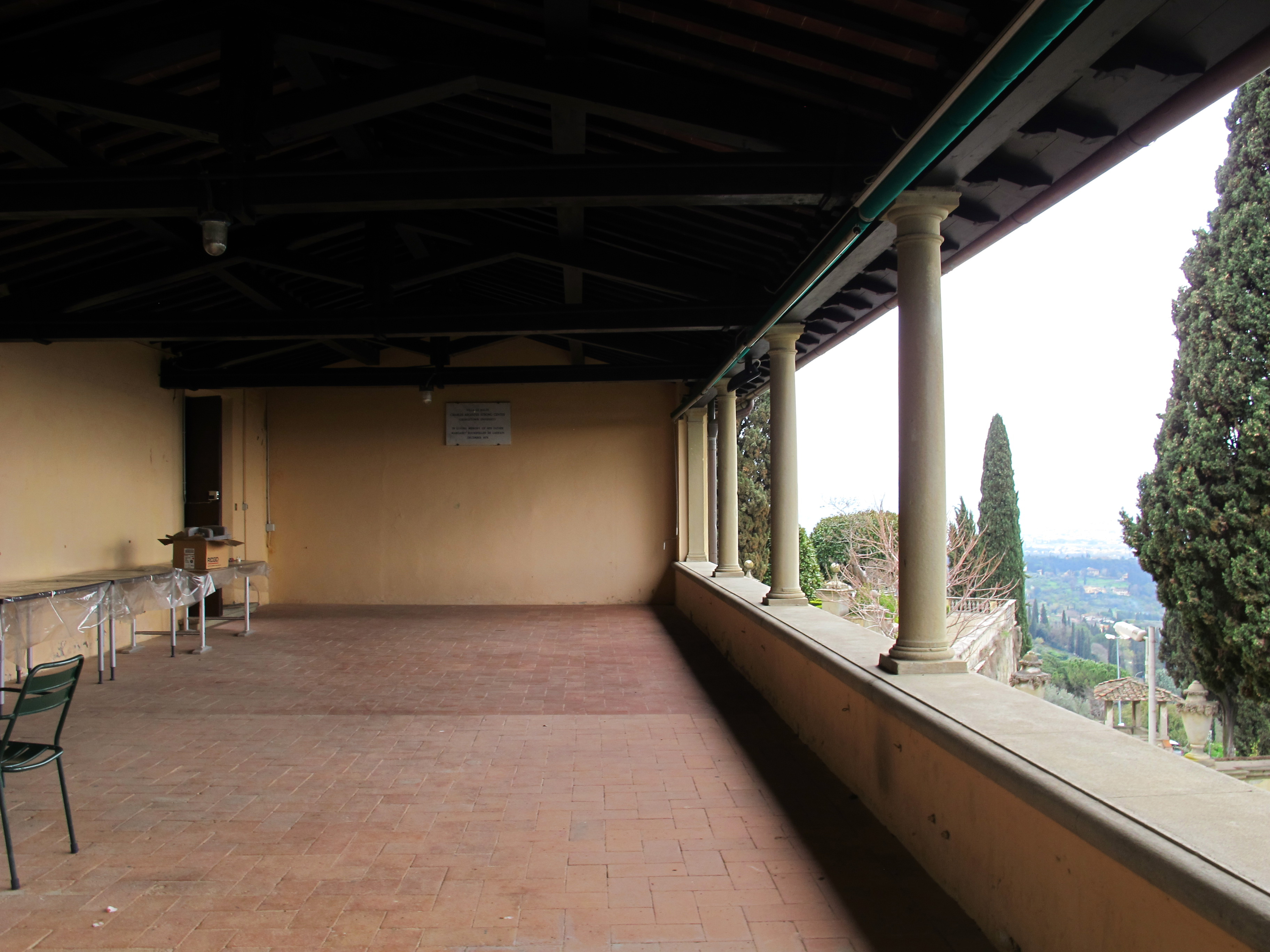
The original entrance leads into the loggia above the villino

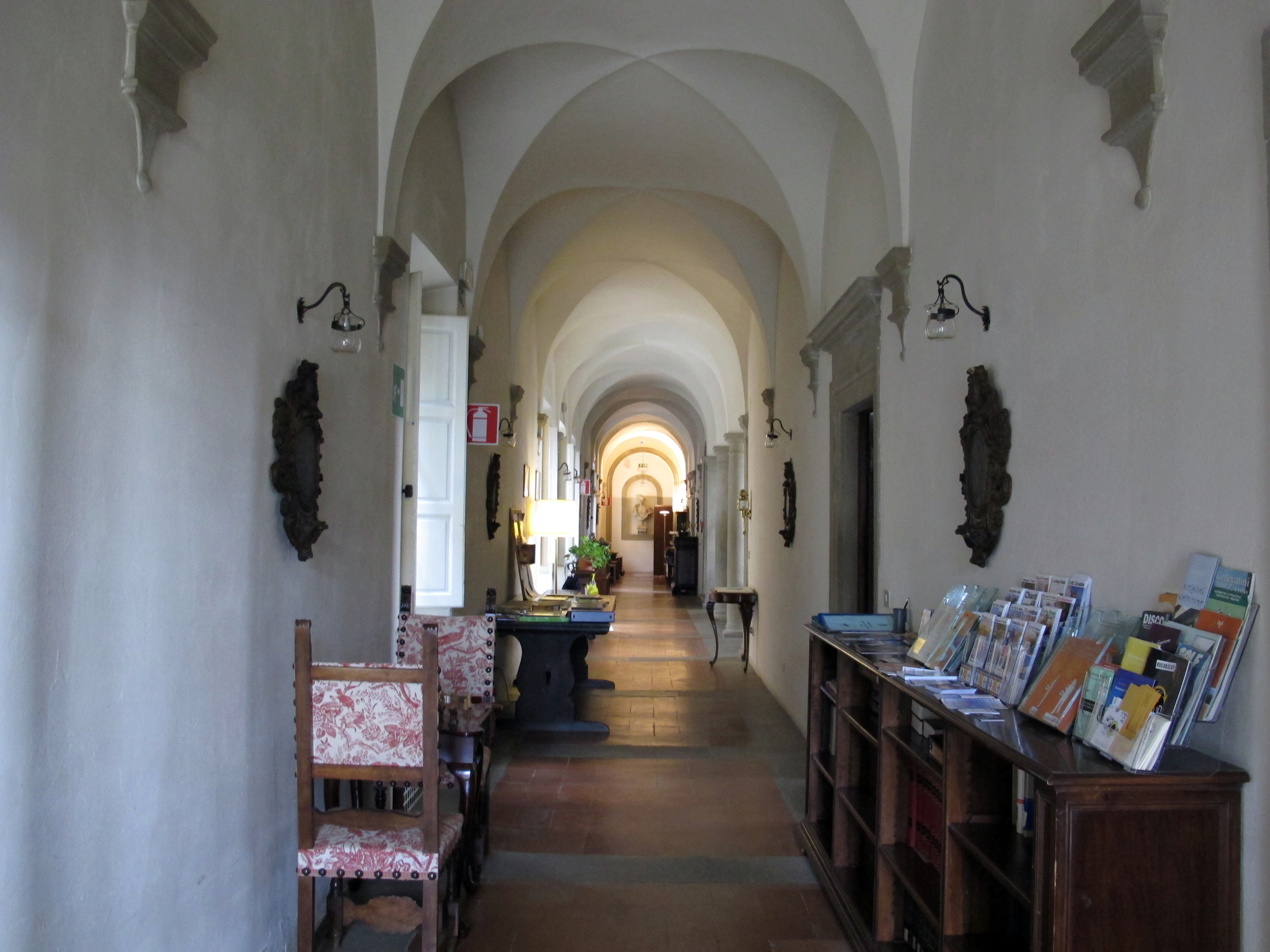
Interior hallway
Gardens
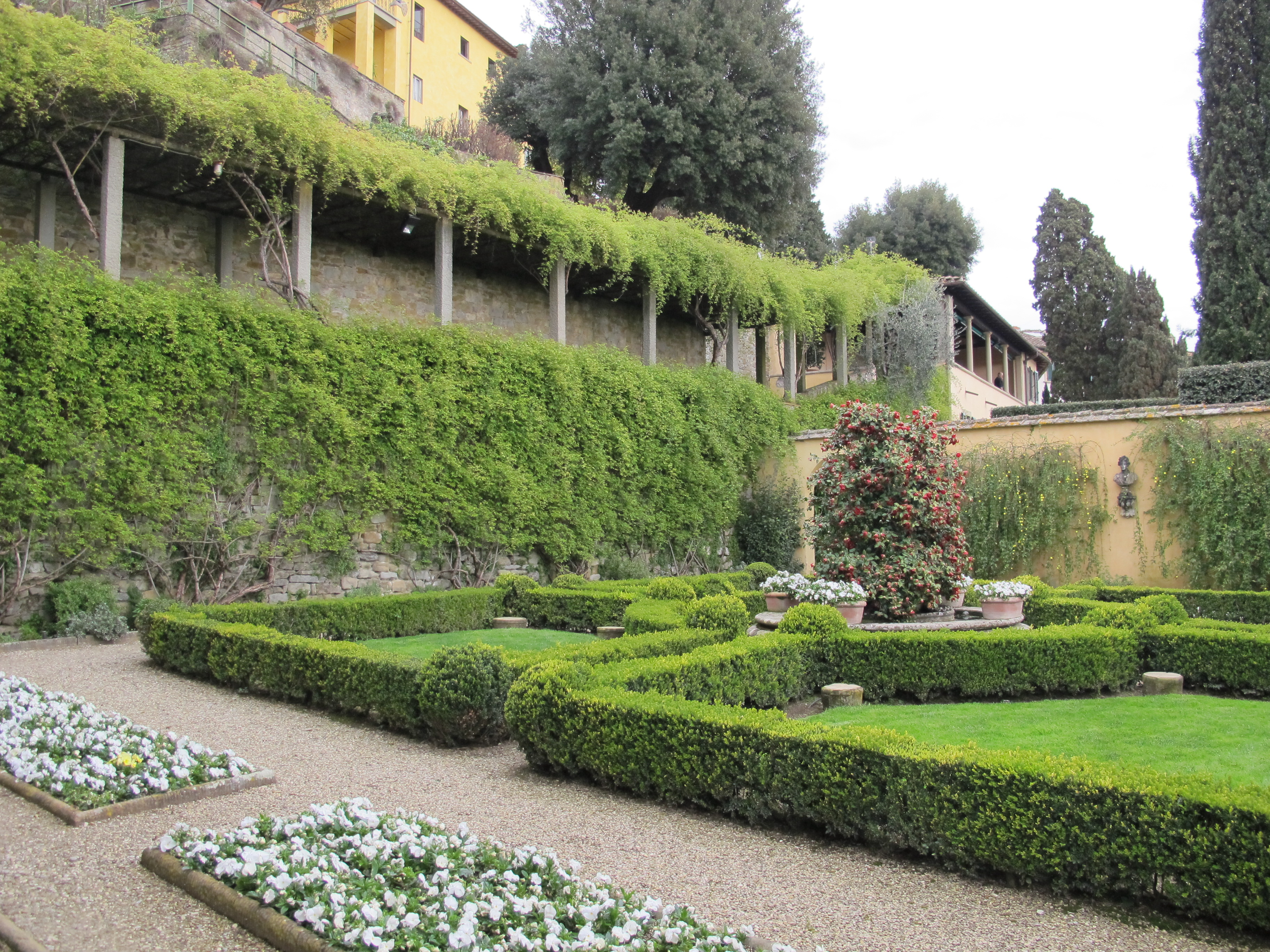
Winter garden easterly adjacent the house

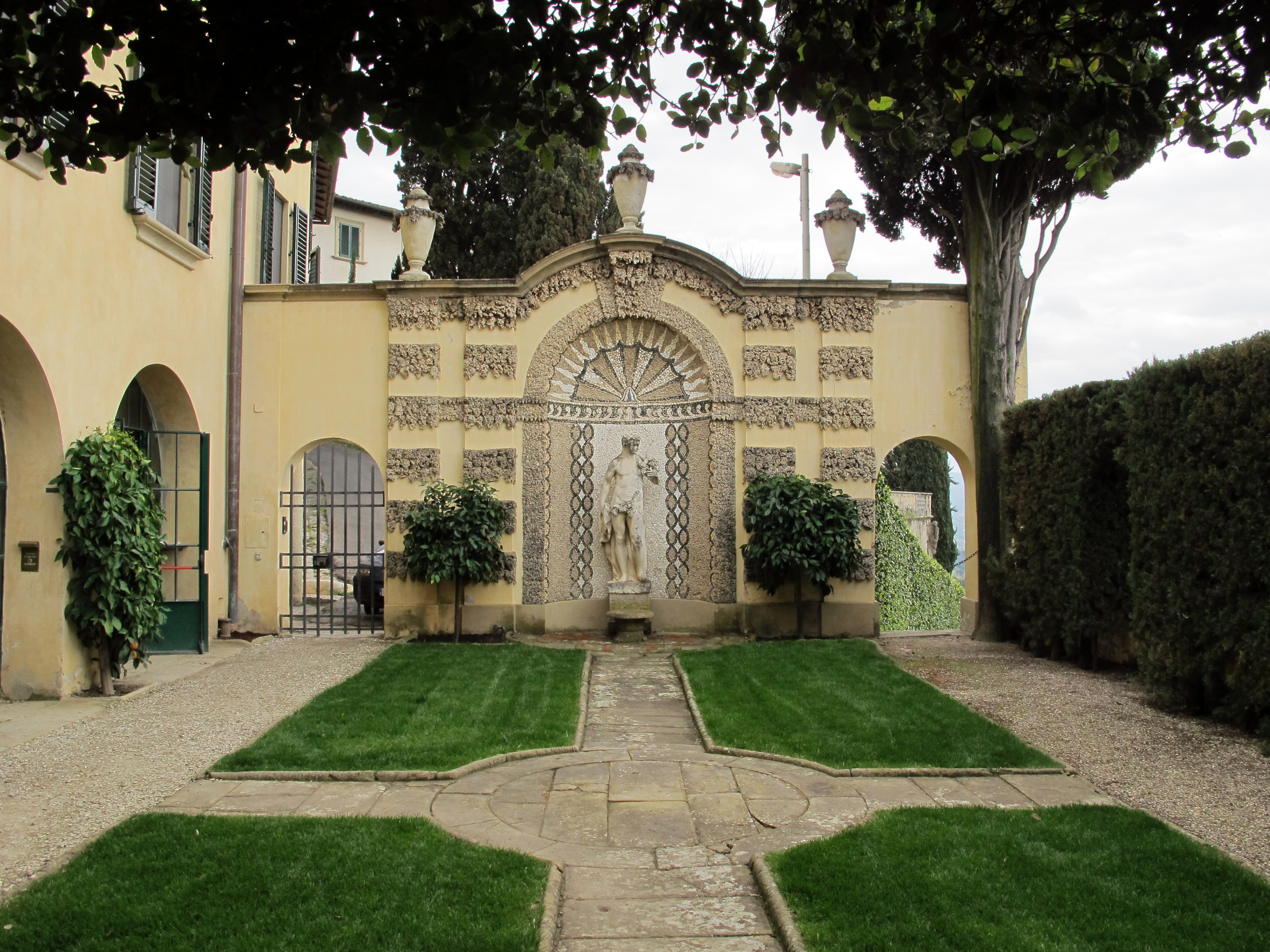
Orange garden with entrance at lefthand side

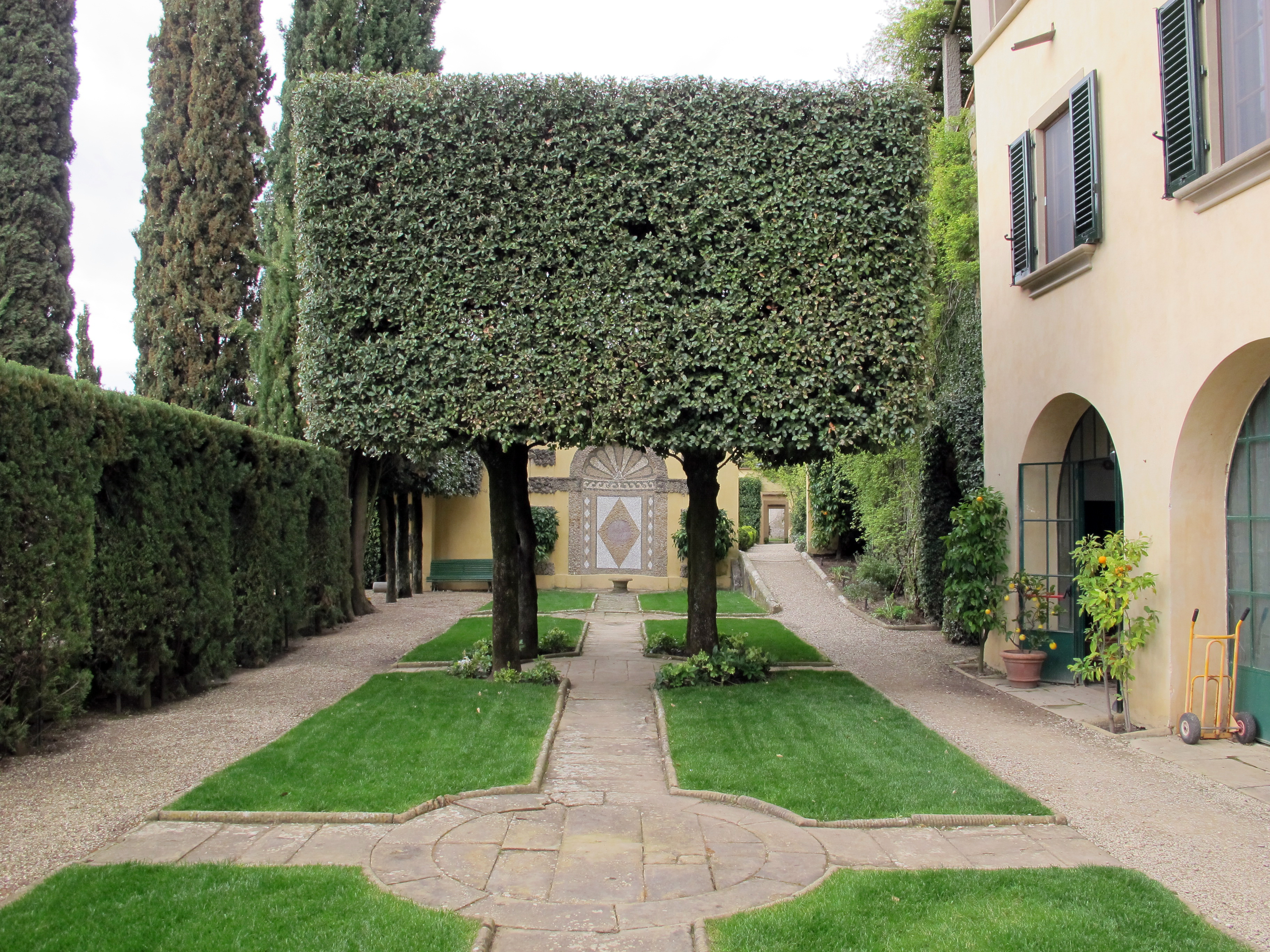
View of the orange garden from the entrance

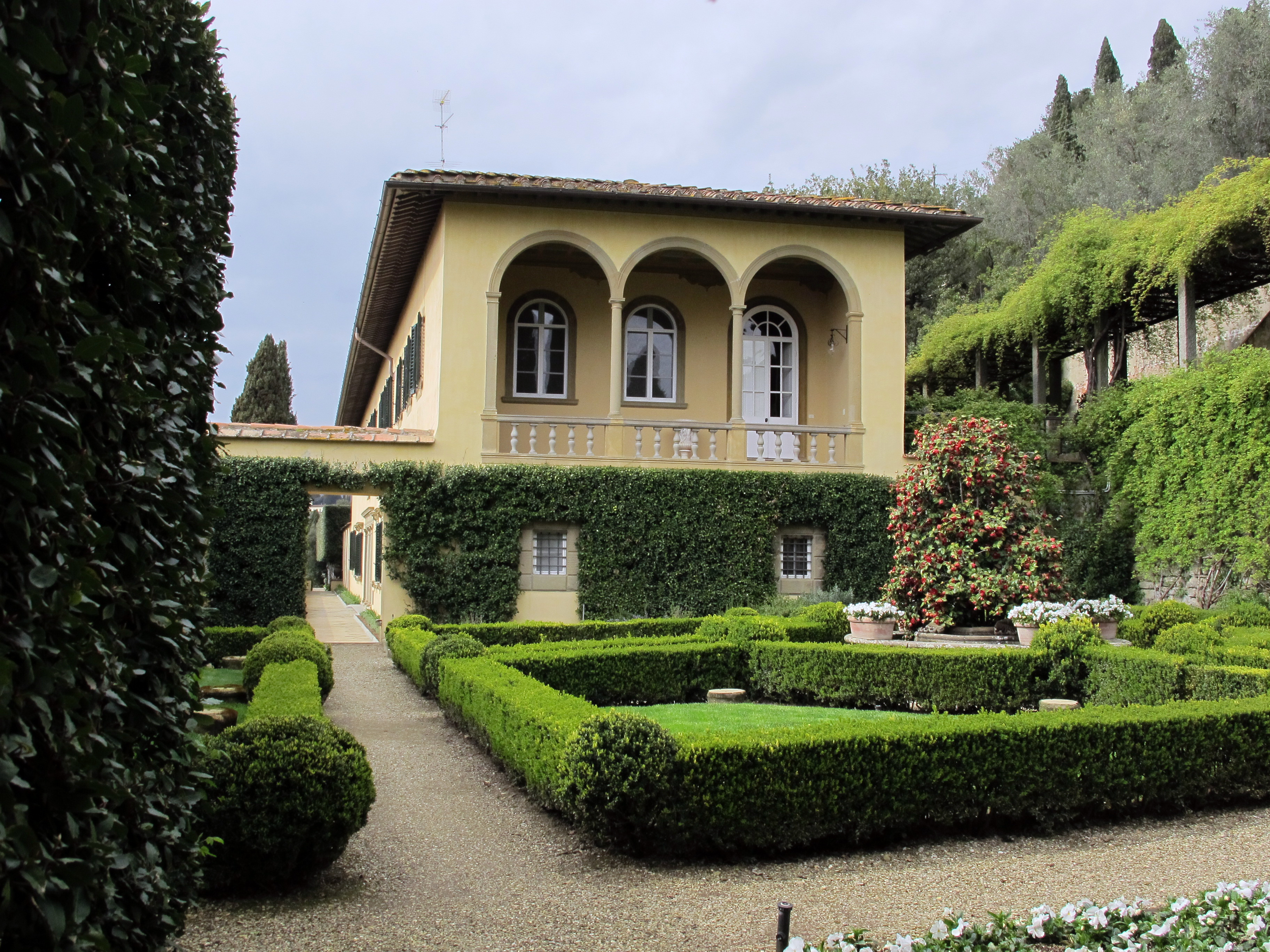
Loggia from the winter garden

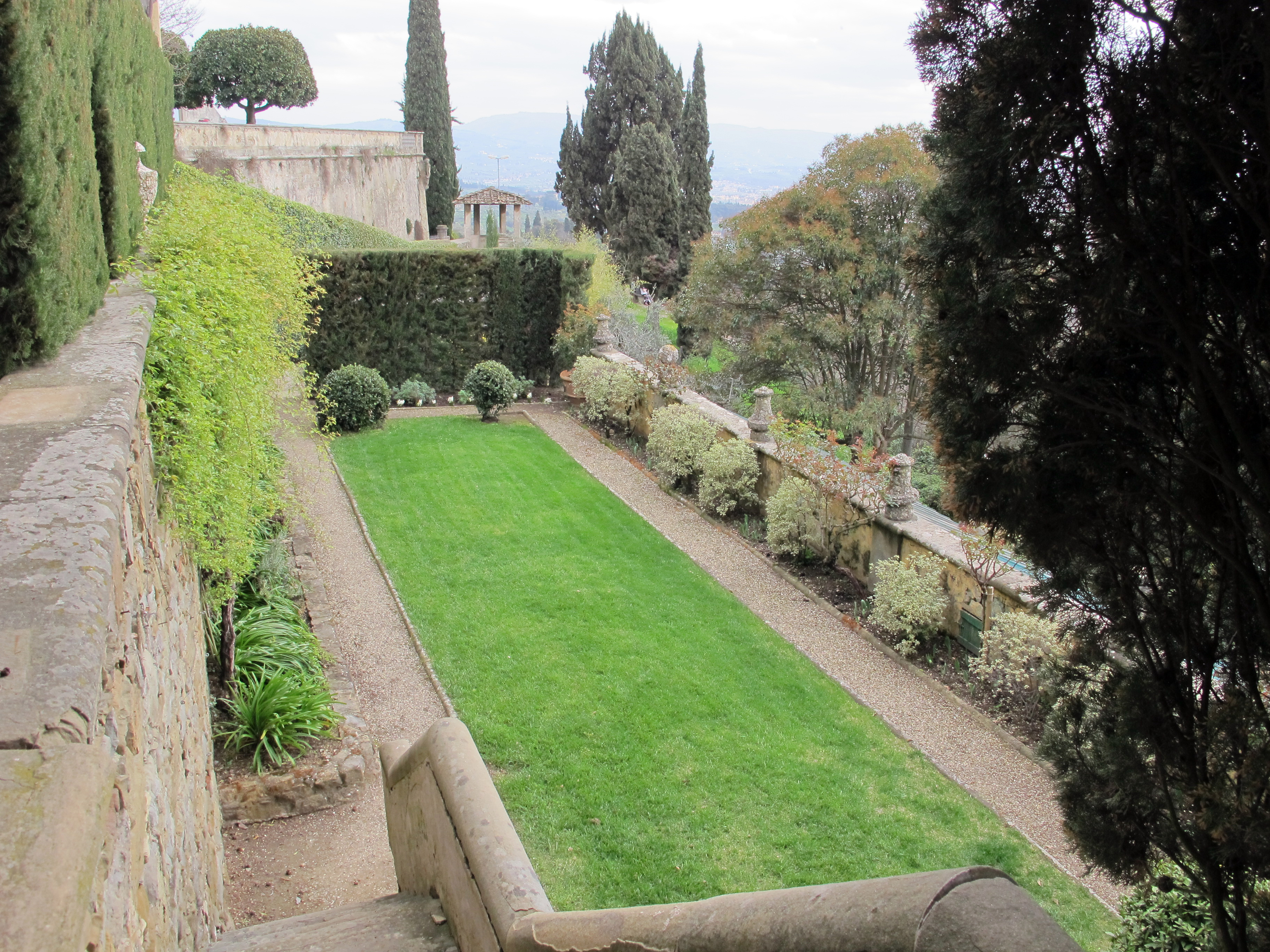
Lower terrace garden

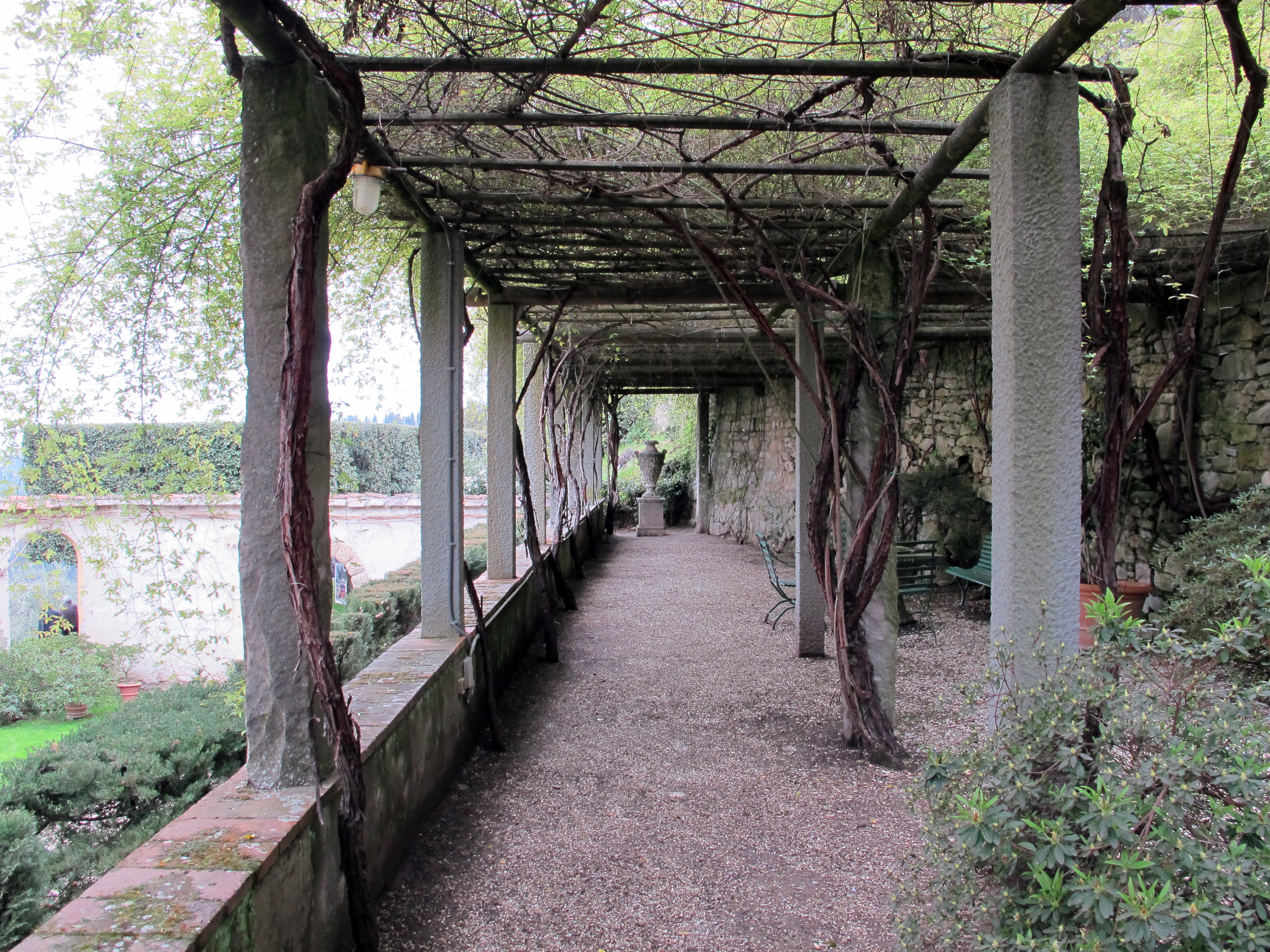
Pergola

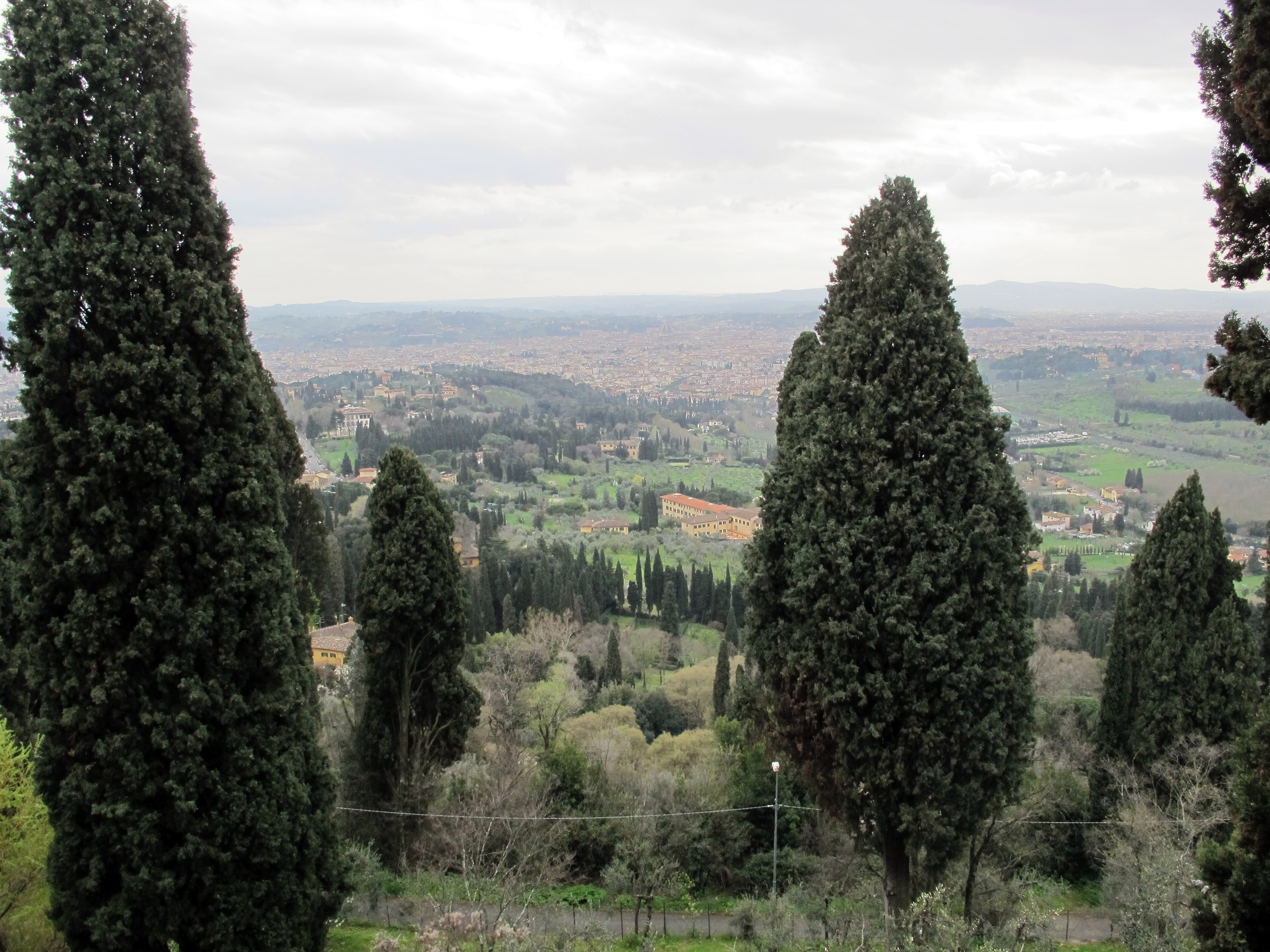
Panorama of the city of Florence from the villa

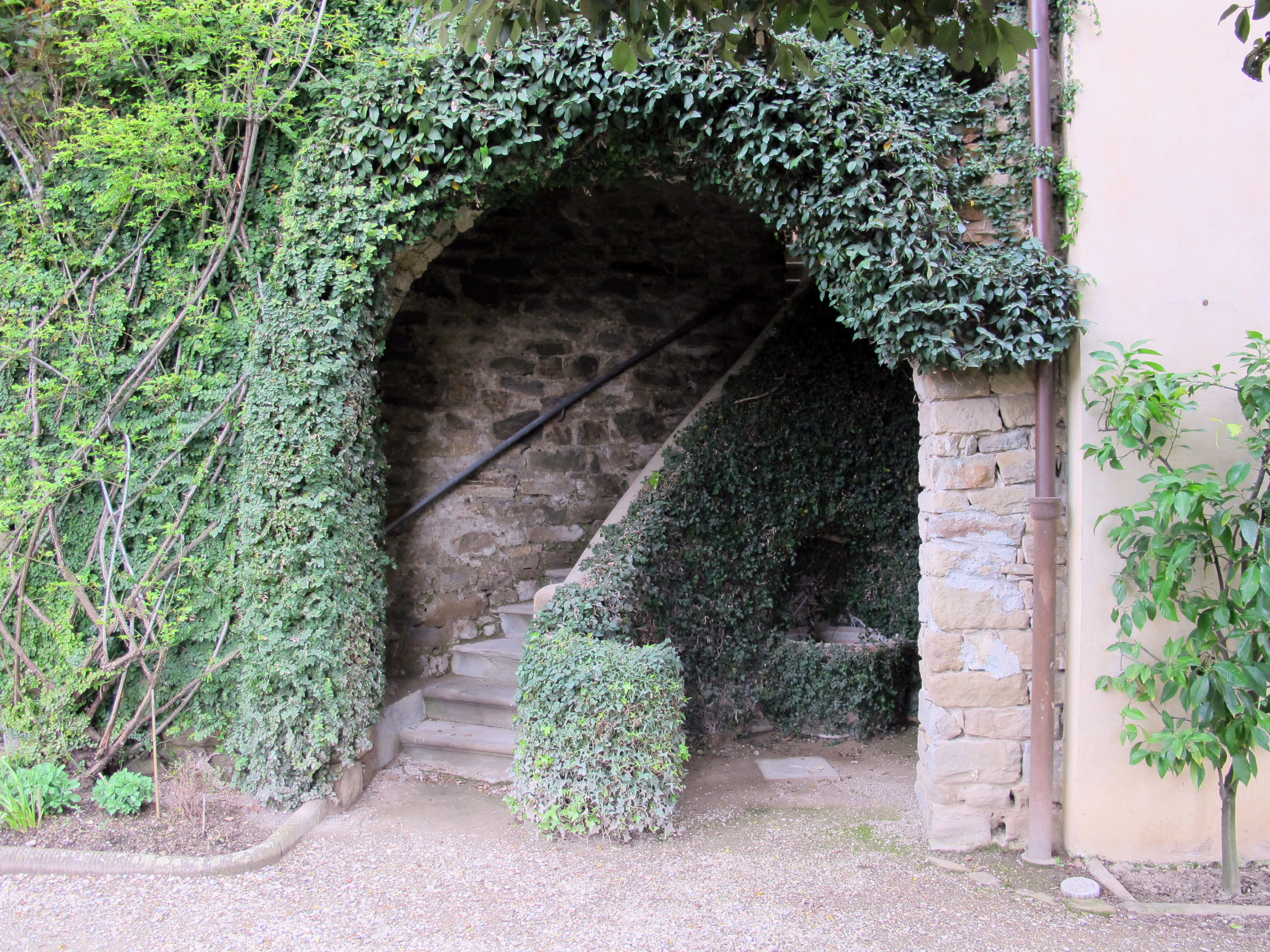
Staircase to the larger loggia

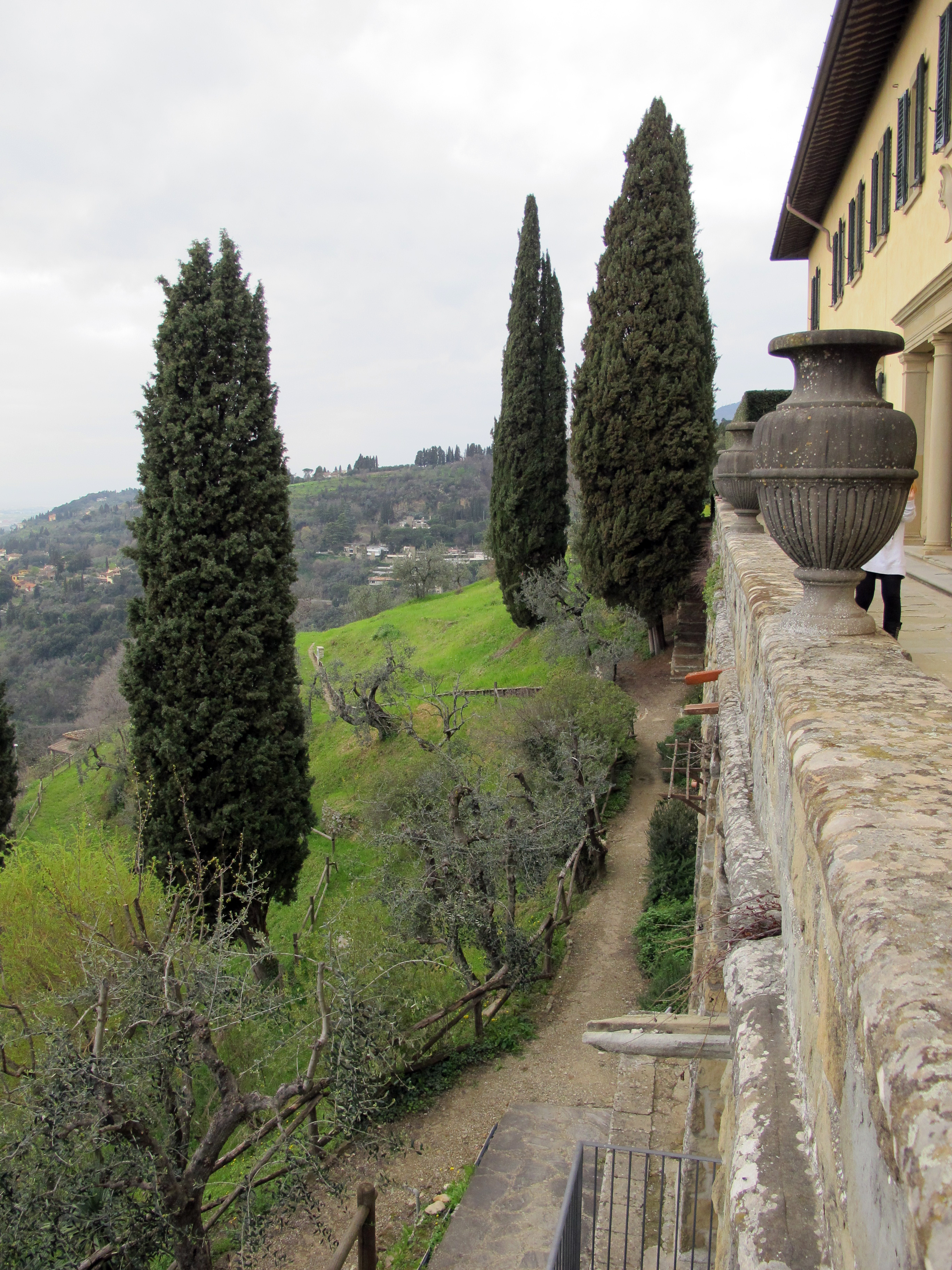
Steep cliff on which the villa is perched

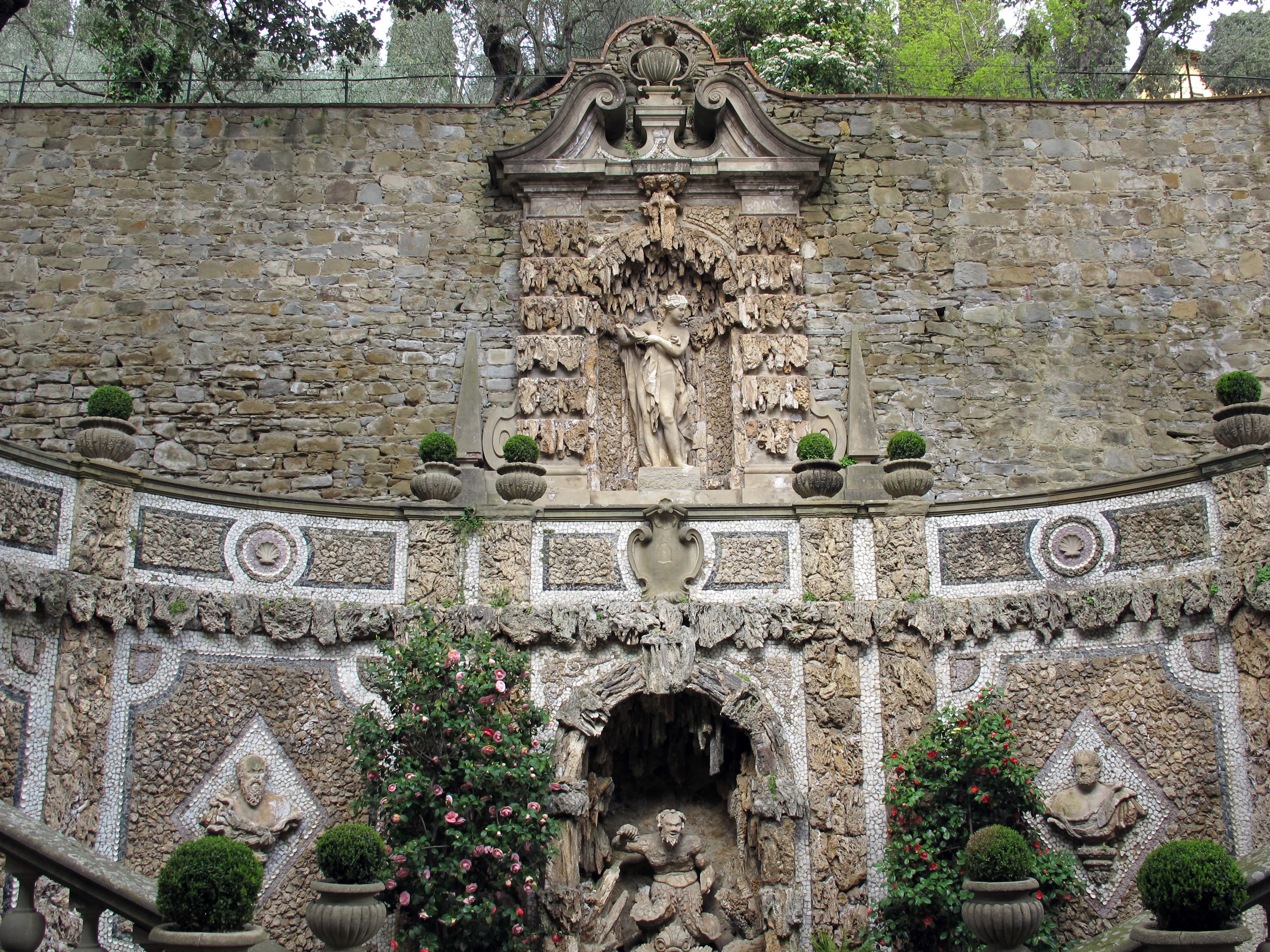
Top of the main fountain

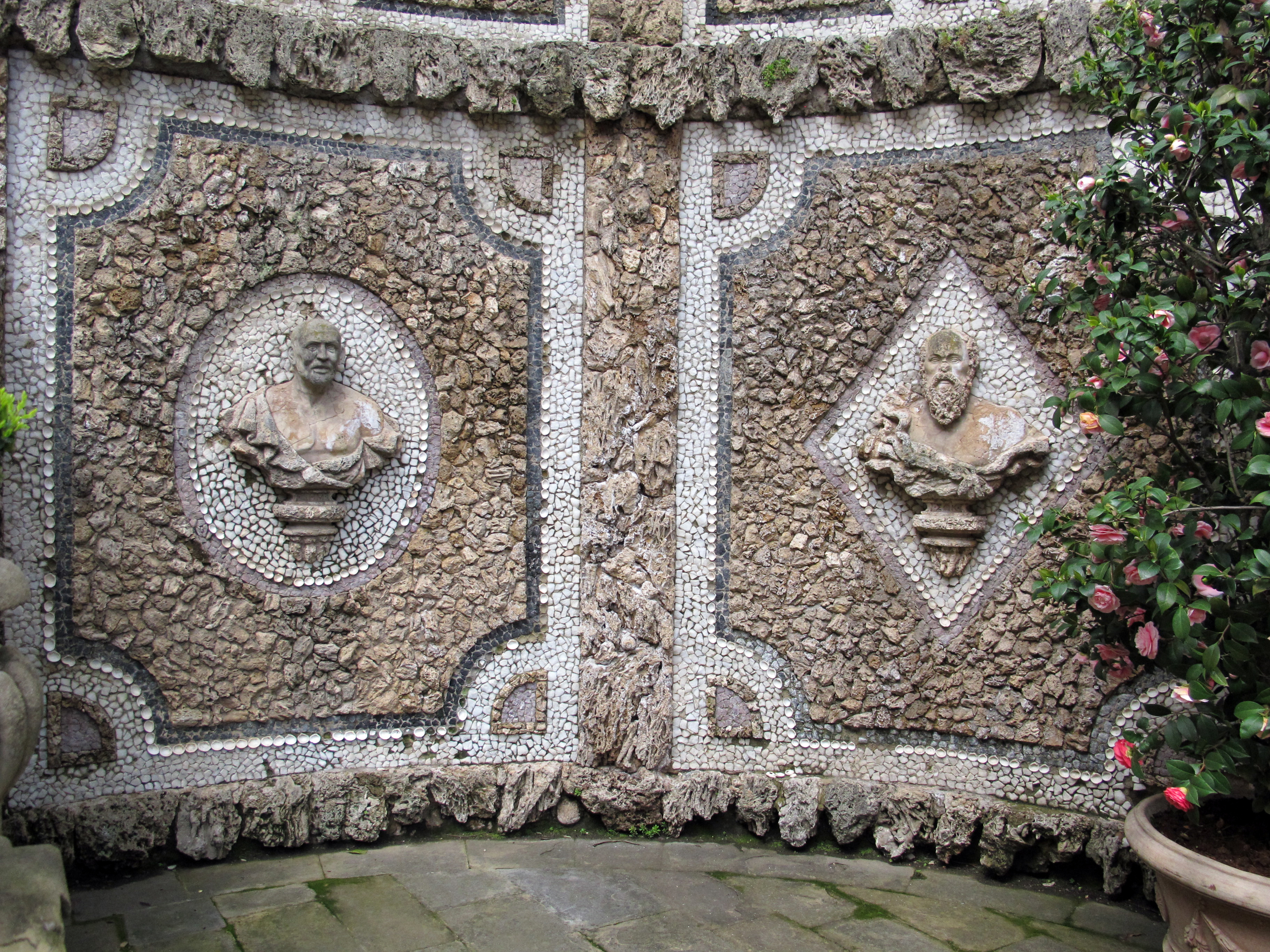
Busts of philosophers

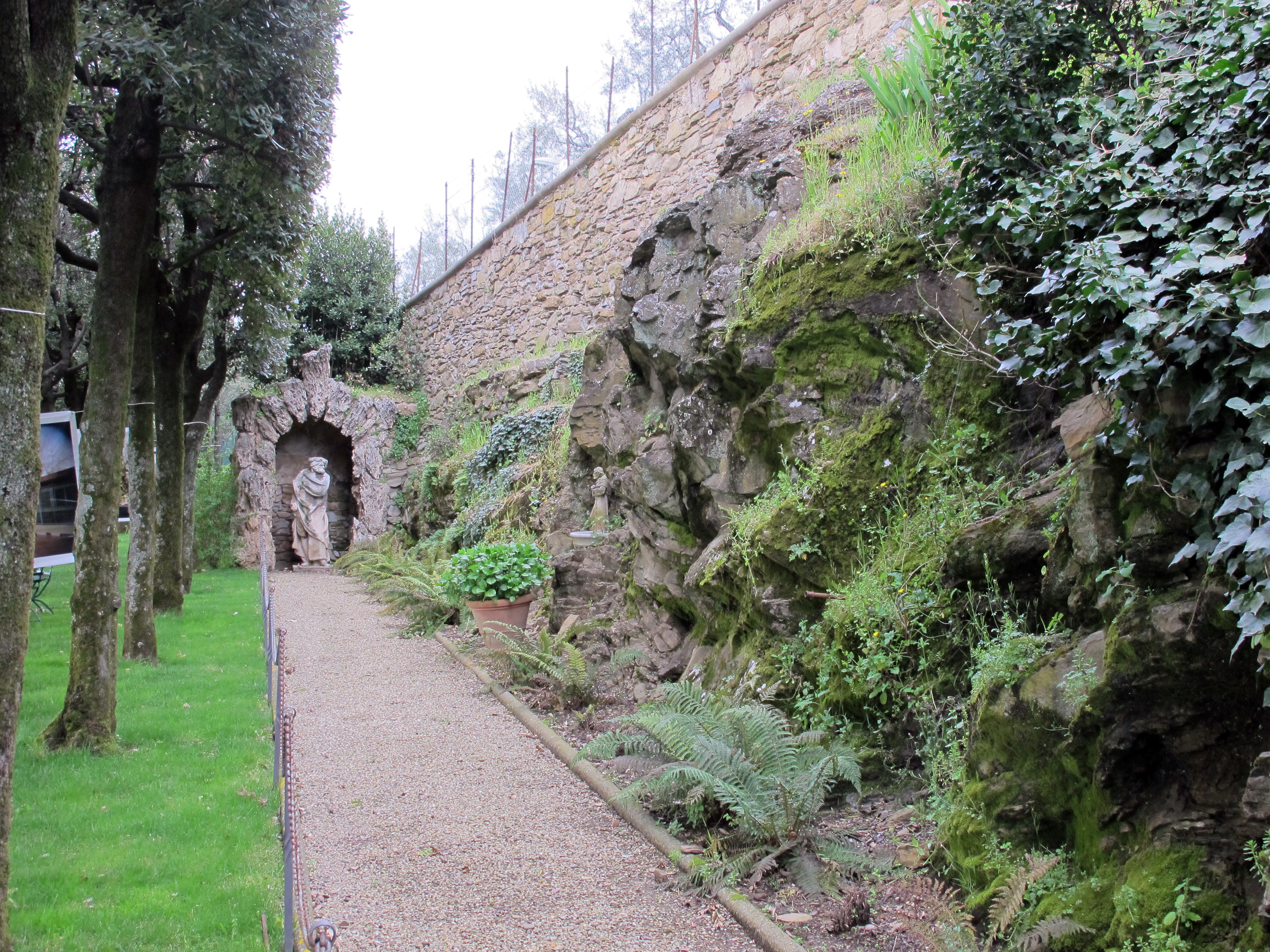
Grotto on the western side

== See also ==
- John Glavin, The Good New: A Tuscan Villa, Shakespeare and Death (New Academia 2018). Book based on his time teaching at the Villa Le Balze.
- Villa Medici in Fiesole
- Fiesole Cathedral
- San Francesco Monastery (Fiesole)
- Villa San Girolamo
