= Mystical union =

Mystical union may refer to:

- Mysticism, religious traditions of human transformation aided by various practices and religious experiences

== Christianity ==
- Hypostatic union, a technical term in Christian theology employed in mainstream Christology to describe the union of Christ's humanity and divinity in one hypostasis
- Mystical theology, the branch of Christian theology that deals with the divine encounter and self-communication of God with the faithful
- Sacramental union, the Lutheran theological doctrine of the real presence of the Body and Blood of Christ in the Eucharist
- Union with Christ, the relationship between the believer and Jesus Christ

== Other uses ==
- Henosis, the classical Greek word for mystical "oneness", "union" or "unity"
