= Margaret Rockefeller Strong =

American activist

- Born: June 11, 1897
- Died: December 5, 1985 (aged 88)
- Occupation: Philanthropist
- Spouses: George de Cuevas (m. 1927; died 1961) Raymundo de Larraín (m. 1977)
- Children: 2, including Elizabeth de Cuevas
- Parent(s): Charles Augustus Strong; Elizabeth Rockefeller Strong

Margaret Rockefeller Strong (June 11, 1897 – December 5, 1985) was an American heiress and prominent member of the Rockefeller family. She was the maternal granddaughter of John D. Rockefeller and his wife Laura Spelman Rockefeller.

== Early life and education ==
She was the daughter of Elizabeth "Bessie" Rockefeller (1866–1906) and Dr. Charles Augustus Strong (1862–1940). Her maternal grandfather was Standard Oil co-founder John D. Rockefeller (1839–1937).

== Career ==
Strong saved a row of Neo-Federal townhouses on Park Avenue designed by McKim, Mead & White from destruction by purchasing the property and giving one of the townhouses to the Queen Sofía Spanish Institute in 1965. She then donated the corner townhouse to her cousin, David Rockefeller, who there founded the Center for Inter-American Relations, now the Americas Society. In December 1979, Margaret donated her father's estate, Villa Le Balze in Fiesole, Tuscany, Italy, to Georgetown University which operates an overseas campus there.

== Personal life ==
She married Chilean ballet businessman George de Cuevas on August 3, 1927. They had two children:

- Elizabeth de Cuevas (1929–2023) who married Joel Carmichael, a writer, in 1960. They had one daughter; Deborah Carmichael.
- John de Cuevas (October 6, 1930 – December 6, 2018), an educator and philanthropist, who married three times. His first marriage to his boyhood sweetheart Phyllis Nahl Van Wyck was in 1951. He remarried in April 1962 to Silvia Maria Bartucci having one daughter; Margaret de Cuevas and two granddaughters. In 1988, he married a third time to Sue Lonoff.

By the time her husband, George de Cuevas, died in 1961, they had been separated.

On April 25, 1977, she married his protégée, Raymundo de Larrain (Raimundo Larraín Valdés), who was over thirty years her junior. Although several newspapers reported that de Larrain was the nephew of her late husband—and he even referred to him as his uncle—they were not related by blood. He was a descendant of the Chilean aristocratic Larraín family. He choreographed, designed sets and costumes for de Cuevas's ballet company and was later a photographer.

== Death and estate ==
Following her death in 1985, there was a dispute about her estate between her husband and children, which ended in a court settlement in 1987.
