= Elizabeth de Cuevas =

American sculptor (1929–2023)

- De Cuevas c.1970s
- Born: January 22, 1929; Saint-Germain-en-Laye, France
- Died: March 19, 2023 (aged 94)
- Other names: Elizabeth Strong Cuevas, Strong-Cuevas
- Education: Art Students League of New York
- Known for: Monumental sculpture
- Style: Modernism
- Spouse: Joel Carmichael (m. 1960; died 2006)
- Children: 1
- Parents: George de Cuevas (father); Margaret Rockefeller Strong (mother)
- Website: strongcuevassculpture.com

Elizabeth de Cuevas (January 22, 1929 – March 19, 2023) was a French-born American sculptor born in Saint-Germain-en-Laye. She was known for her monumental sculpture work. She also known as Elizabeth Strong Cuevas, Elizabeth Strong de Cuevas, and by the moniker Strong-Cuevas.

== Early life and education ==
De Cuevas was born on January 22, 1929, to Margaret Rockefeller Strong (who was a grandchild of John D. Rockefeller) and George de Cuevas, a Chilean ballet promoter. She was raised in Saint-Germain-en-Laye, France, Florence, Italy and New York City.

She studied sculpture at the Art Students League of New York, with instructor John Hovannes, who encouraged her to carve.

De Cuevas married Joel Carmichael, a writer, in 1960. The couple had a daughter.

== Career ==
She worked under the moniker Strong-Cuevas (not using her first name). Early in her career she became known for producing figurative sculptures of large heads, many of which were in profile. Later her highly abstract, cubistic and totemic works consisted of human faces rendered from multiple angles.

Her early work involved stone and wood carving. In the 1970s she became associated with Marcel (Toto) Meylan who assisted her in developing her work on a monumental scale and cast works in stainless steel and bronze. Some of these were produced at Tallix Foundry (later Polich Tallix).

Starting in the late 1970s de Cuevas widely exhibited her work at galleries and museums, and public art venues such as Grounds for Sculpture, where several of her works are in their permanent collection.

Her influences included physics and spiritual concepts. She wrote of her work, "I am trying to show the underlying unity of minds. In my negative spaces, I am showing spirit beyond matter, idea before material form.”

== Collections ==
De Cuevas' work is held in the permanent collections of Grounds For Sculpture, the Guild Hall of East Hampton, the Bruce Museum, the Heckscher Museum of Art, the Long Island Museum in Stony Brook, among other venues.

== Legacy ==
Two monographs on her work have been published by Abrams. A documentary was produced on her life and work in 2002, and a sequel to the film premiered in 2021. She was a frequent donor and supporter of the New York Public Library, the Morgan Library and Museum, and the Metropolitan Museum of Art.
