= Union with Christ =

Relationship between the believer and Jesus Christ

In Christianity, the phrase "union with Christ", in its broadest sense, refers to the relationship between the believer and Jesus Christ. In this sense, John Murray says that union with Christ is "the central truth of the whole doctrine of salvation". The expression "in Christ" (en Christo, en kyrio, en Christo Iesou, en auto etc.) appears frequently in the New Testament: according to Albert Schweitzer, "'being-in-Christ' is the prime enigma of the Pauline teaching: once grasped it gives the clue to the whole." Given the large number of occurrences and the wide range of contexts, the phrase embodies a breadth of meaning.

According to the narrower sense of the phrase used in Christian theology, union with Christ is a step in the ordo salutis ("order of salvation"), and the basis of the believer's justification. In this sense, union with Christ follows faith and precedes adoption (Galatians 3:26-27). Augustus Strong describes it in this way: "union with Christ logically precedes both regeneration and justification; and yet, chronologically, the moment of our union with Christ is also the moment when we are regenerated and justified."

== Theological content ==
=== Basis ===
In Christian theology, the union of Christ is built on the a priori assumption of Adam's union with humanity (Romans 5:12-21). Also according to the Apostle Paul, Christ's death and resurrection is a prerequisite for believers to be identified with Christ (Romans 6:8-10). In other words, the vicarious death of Jesus is the basis for incorporation into Christ.

The expression "in Christ" (en Christo, en kyrio, en Christo Iesou, en auto etc.) occurs 216 times in the Pauline letters and 26 times in the Johannine literature. Paul uses the phrase "en Christo" as a synonym for a Christian (Romans 16:7) and the phrase "en emoi" to describe the intimate identification of Christ with the believer (Galatians 2:20). The New Testament teaches that union with Christ is precipitated by faith and baptism, i.e. those who believe are baptized "into" Christ (John 3:16, Romans 6:3). Both the apostle John and Paul employ the Greek preposition eis rather than en in these passages to convey the notion of union with Christ. The ESV Study Bible explains the use of this particular preposition in its note on John 11:25, "The preposition translated "in" (Greek: eis) is striking, for eis ordinarily means "into", giving the sense that genuine faith in Christ in a sense brings people "into" Christ, so that they rest in and become united with Christ. (This same expression is found in 3:16, 18, 36; 6:35; 7:38; 12:44, 46; 14:12; 1 John 5:10.)"

=== Nature ===
I am the vine; you are the branches.
Whoever abides in me and I in him,
he it is that bears much fruit,
for apart from me you can do nothing.

— John 15:5, ESV

There are a number of ways of describing the nature of the union with Christ. Roman Catholic theology holds that believers actually imbibe the physical body and blood of Christ when they partake in the Eucharist. Reformed theology using the model of federal headship, where humanity is covenantally represented by Adam, sees Christians represented covenantally by Christ. Pietist theology see a union with Christ as mystical, "hidden" in the spiritual dimension. Evangelical theology contains the idea of an experiential union, where Jesus having gone through life, death and resurrection, shares these experiences with believers. Both Reformed and Evangelical theology acknowledges that union with Christ is the subjective application of God's objective work in Salvation. In Protestant theology the phrase union with Christ means a mutual indwelling (John 14-15), of Christians and the triune God, without affirming that Christians are absorbed into God. Several biblical themes are expressed within concept of being "in Christ." For example, the Old Testament notion of God dwelling among the Israelites (Exodus 25:8) is expressed by Jesus in the New Testament as the triune God dwelling with believers (John 14:23).

Augustus H. Strong describes the nature of the believer's union with Christ using five adjectives. This union is:

1. An organic union – in which believers become members of Christ and enjoy a mutual, reciprocal dependence on Christ for life and He on them for expression (Eph. 5:29–30).
2. A vital union – in which Christ operates within believers as their life and becomes the dominating principle within them (Gal. 2:20; Col. 3:3–4).
3. A spiritual union – that is, a union originating from and sustained by the Holy Spirit in their spirit (Rom. 8:9-10; Eph 3:16–17).
4. An indissoluble union – that is, a union which, by virtue of Christ's eternal, divine, and incorruptible power and grace, can never be dissolved (Matt. 28:20; Rom. 8:39; Heb. 7:16).
5. An inscrutable union – that is, a divine and mystical union of knowledge-surpassing intimacy and value (Eph. 3:19; 5:32; Col. 1:27).

== Denominational interpretations ==
=== Roman Catholic ===
Traditional Roman Catholic theology centres the union with Christ in a substantial sense on the unity of the institutional church, past and present. "The communion of saints is the spiritual solidarity which binds together the faithful on earth, the souls in purgatory, and the saints in heaven in the organic unity of the same mystical body under Christ its head." Christians, according to Roman Catholic theology, are united to Christ through the sacraments.

Medieval conceptions of union with Christ were influenced in large part by mysticism, such as in the preaching of St. Bernard of Clairvaux. St. Bernard applied the concept of bridal love in the Hebrew Bible's Song of Songs to a "mystical union" with Christ, wherein Jesus was bridegroom and the worshipper/church (humanity) was His bride. In this conception, Jesus’ love for humanity was manifested in his sacrifice on the cross, something that was reenacted everyday in the Eucharist. In medieval mystical union theology, the sacrament of the Eucharist was the foremost conduit with which humanity found union with Christ.

Adopting the theology put forward by Pope Pius XI, Pope Francis reflects that the believer's union with Christ transcends all boundaries of time and space: believers can be "with" Christ at the hour of his redemptive sacrifice on the cross as well as united with the risen Jesus who now reigns in heaven.

=== Reformed ===
In Reformed theology, union with Christ is understood to be a comprehensive category that runs through the entire doctrine of Salvation. John Murray observes: "Union with Christ is a very inclusive subject. It embraces the wide span of salvation from the ultimate source in the eternal election of God to its final fruition in the glorification of the elect."

Sinclair Ferguson distinguishes six categories of union with Christ. Union with Christ is federal or covenantal in the sense that Christ's obedience is accounted to believers. It is carnal or fleshly in the sense that Christ became incarnate and thus became one with humanity. Union with Christ is also a faith union in which by faith Christians depend on Christ for nourishment. It is a spiritual union because Christians are united to Christ by the agency of the Holy Spirit. It is an extensive union in that Christians are united with Christ in everything he has done, including his life, death, burial, resurrection, ascension, and session. It is finally a union of life because Christ lives in Christians and he is visible in their lives.

As a step in the order of salvation, union with Christ was seen by John Calvin to be the basis for both justification and sanctification. Alister McGrath notes that while Martin Bucer suggested that justification causes (moral) regeneration, Calvin argued that "both justification and regeneration are the results of the believer's union with Christ through faith."

=== Evangelical ===
Some Evangelicals see union with Christ as a discrete stage in the "order of salvation". The evangelical theologian William Shedd comments "The impartation of Christ's righteousness presupposes a union with him." Robert Dabney, while avoiding deification, said that the bond of the union is the indwelling of the Holy Spirit.

=== Eastern Orthodox ===
Eastern Orthodox theology emphasizes the incarnation as the starting point for our union with Christ. "In Christ God becomes one with us in order to make us one with him; he stooped to take our nature, in order that we might be restored to become partakers of his nature."

== See also ==
- Imputed righteousness
- Justification (theology)
- Divinization (Christian)
- Theosis (Eastern Orthodox theology)
