= George de Cuevas =

Chilean ballet choreographer (1885–1961)

- Born: Jorge Cuevas Bartholín; 1885; Santiago, Chile
- Died: 22 February 1961 (aged 75–76); Les Délices, Cannes, France
- Occupations: ballet impresario, choreographer
- Known for: Grand Ballet du Marquis de Cuevas
- Spouse: Margaret Rockefeller Strong
- Children: 2, including Elizabeth de Cuevas

Jorge Cuevas Bartholín, known as George de Cuevas (1885 – 22 February 1961), was a Chilean-born ballet impresario and choreographer who was best known for the Grand Ballet du Marquis de Cuevas that he formed in 1944.

== Life and career ==
Cuevas was born as Jorge Cuevas Bartholín in 1885 in Santiago, Chile, a son of Eduardo Cuevas Avaria (1821–1897), a prominent Chilean politician and former diplomat, and his third wife, the former María Manuela del Carmen Bartholín de la Guarda, who was half Danish. He had five siblings: Roberto, Luís, Enrique, Sara, and Carmela. He also had 11 half-siblings from his father's previous marriages.

Though Cuevas was apparently homosexual, he married Margaret Rockefeller Strong, a granddaughter of John D. Rockefeller, in Paris on 3 August 1927. Around the time of the wedding, Cuevas had been serving as a secretary at the Chilean legation in London; the bride had been raised in Italy and studied chemistry at Cambridge University. The Cuevases had two children, John (born 1931) and Elizabeth (born 1929, aka Bessie, later sculptor Elizabeth Strong-Cuevas). Some sources state that Cuevas was the eighth Marquis de Piedrablanca y Guana, but others state that the title originated in a 1931 petition by Cuevas to King Alfonso XIII of Spain, but was not confirmed due to the latter's abdication. The title of Marquis de Piedrablanca y Guana was first granted to the conquistador Pedro Cortes de Monroy.

He became a naturalized citizen of the United States in July 1940 at the Ocean County Naturalization Court in Toms River, New Jersey, renouncing his title and becoming legally George de Cuevas. His title, however, continued to be used socially and in news reports. Cuevas and his wife sponsored an exhibition in 1940 at the New York World's Fair that included old masters and French moderns borrowed from private collections and valued at $30 million.

He founded a new ballet company as the Ballet International in New York City in 1944, performing at a now-destroyed theater in Columbus Circle. The company was variously called the Grand Ballet de Monte Carlo or the Grand Ballet du Marquis de Cuevas, but was most commonly called The de Cuevas Ballet by theatergoers.

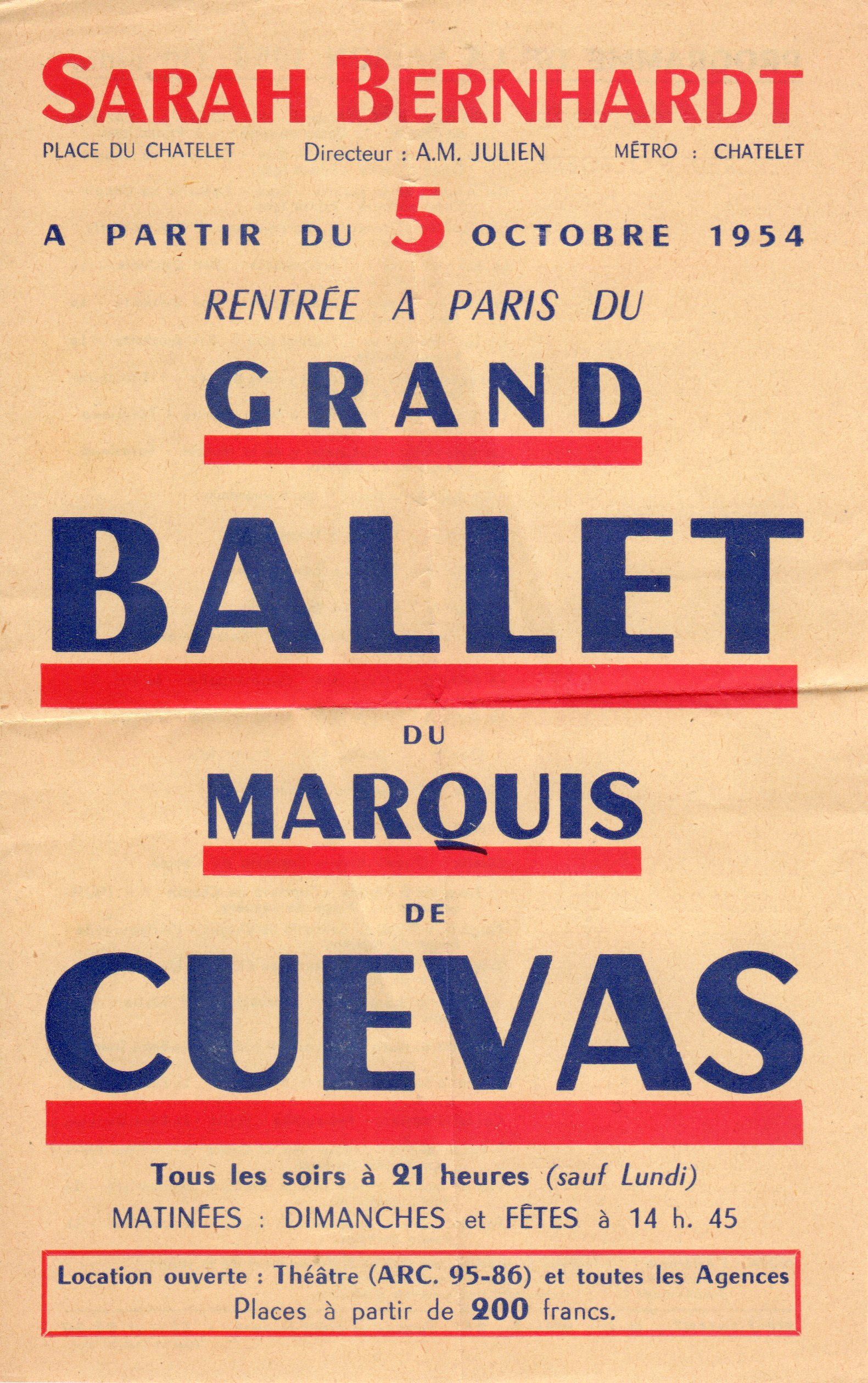
Grand Ballet du Marquis de Cuevas flyer for performances on 5 October 1954. From the Marquis de Cuevas Collection at Ailina Dance Archives.

In 1947, Rosella Hightower accepted an invitation from Cuevas to join his new ballet company. The presence there of choreographer Bronislava Nijinska was one of the major factors in Hightower's decision. Nijinska choreographed for Hightower the "glitteringly virtuosic" Rondo Capriccioso. In addition to classic dances, Hightower's performances included Piège de Lumière by John Taras, the troupe's choreographer and balletmaster, in which she danced the role of a butterfly in a tropical forest who enchants a group of escaped convicts.

A 1953 costume party in Biarritz featured 2,000 guests, of 4,000 invitees, who wore 18th-century costumes. Cuevas, dressed in gold lamé and a headdress with towering ostrich plumes, came dressed as the "King of Nature."

On 30 March 1958, at age 72, Cuevas faced off against the 52-year-old retired ballet master and choreographer Serge Lifar in a duel in France. The duel was precipitated by an argument over changes to Black and White (Suite en Blanc), a ballet by Lifar that was being presented by the Cuevas ballet company. Lifar had his face slapped in public after insisting that he retained the rights to Black and White. Lifar sent his seconds to Cuevas who refused to extend an apology and chose to duel with swords. As duels had been "technically outlawed" in the 17th century, the time and location of the duel were not disclosed to the public. The duel was conducted in front of 50 newspaper photographers and ended with the two combatants in tears and embraces in what The New York Times called "what may well have been the most delicate encounter in the history of French dueling", with the sole injury being a cut on Lifar's right forearm in the seventh minute. Jean-Marie Le Pen was Cuevas's second.

The final success of his career was a production of The Sleeping Beauty that debuted in Paris in October 1960 and was well received by critics. His doctors allowed him to attend the ballet's premiere, with Cuevas noting that "if I am going to die, I will die backstage." He was rolled onto the stage in a wheelchair after the performance to a standing ovation from the audience.

George de Cuevas died at age 75 on 22 February 1961, at his villa, Les Délices, in Cannes. His troupe was to have opened Sleeping Beauty in Cannes the night after Cuevas died, and it canceled the performance in his memory.
