= Joel Carmichael =

American historian (1915–2006)

- Born: Joel Lipsky; December 31, 1915; New York City, U.S.
- Died: January 27, 2006 (aged 90); New York City, U.S.
- Occupations: historian, magazine editor, translator
- Spouse(s): Mary Carr Thomas, Elizabeth de Cuevas
- Children: 3
- Relatives: Eleazar Lipsky (brother), David Lipsky (brother)
- Writing career
- Notable work: The Death of Jesus

Joel Carmichael (December 31, 1915 – January 27, 2006) was an American historian, magazine editor, and translator.

== Biography ==
=== Early life and education ===
Born Joel Lipsky on December 31, 1915, in New York City, Carmichael was the youngest son of Charlotte Schacht and Louis Lipsky, a founder of the American Zionist movement, President of the Zionist Organization of America. His oldest brother, David (1907–1996) became a publicist; his middle brother, Eleazar (1911–1993), was a lawyer, novelist, journalist, playwright and active Zionist.

Following graduation from high school, he was sent for a year to Palestine. There he began learning Arabic before returning to New York and attending Columbia University. In England, a chance meeting with an Oxford don turned him to read Greek and Russian at Oxford.

=== Career ===
His first book, a translation of a memoir of the Russian Revolution, helped Carmichael land a contract with Oxford University Press. From there, he wrote numerous titles on early Christianity, Arab history and Russian history, and translated Anna Karenina for a new paperback edition. One book, The Death of Jesus, was translated into eight languages. Carmichael was also editor of Midstream, a Zionist magazine, for 24 years, serving from 1975 to 1988 and 1990–2001.

=== Marriage and family ===
Carmichael was married twice: first to the journalist Mary Carr Thomas, then to sculptor Elizabeth de Cuevas in 1960. He had three children.

His granddaughter is the filmmaker Emily Carmichael.

=== Death ===
Carmichael died January 27, 2006, in Manhattan.

== Published works ==
- An Illustrated History of Russia (Reynal, 1960)
- The Eichmann Case: Reactions in West Germany (Marstin Press, 1961)
- Chaim Weizmann: A Biography by Several Hands with Meyer Wolfe Weisgal and David Ben-Gurion (1962)
- The Death of Jesus (Macmillan, 1963)
- A Short History of the Russian Revolution (Nelson, 1964)
- The Shaping of the Arabs: A Study in Ethnic Identity (Macmillan, 1967)
- Karl Marx: The Passionate Logician (Scribner, 1967)
- Open Letter to Moses and Mohammed (J.H. Heineman, 1968)
- A Cultural History of Russia (Weybright and Talley, 1968)
- Trotsky: an Appreciation of His Life (St. Martin's Press, 1975)
- Stalin's Masterpiece (St. Martin's Press, 1976)
- Arabs Today (Anchor Press/Doubleday, 1977)
- The Birth of Christianity: Reality and Myth (Hippocrene Books, 1989)
- A History of Russia (Hippocrene Books, 1990)
- The Satanizing of the Jews: Origin and Development of Mystical Anti-Semitism (Fromm International Pub. Corp., 1992)
- The Unriddling of Christian Origins: A Secular Account (Prometheus Books, 1995)

=== Translations ===
- Carl Brockelmann, History of the Islamic Peoples (G.P. Putnam's Sons, 1939)
- N. N. Sukhanov, The Russian Revolution: A Personal Record (Oxford, 1955)
- Leo Tolstoy, Anna Karenina (Bantam, 1960)
- Dan Theodore, The Origins of Bolshevism (Secker & Warburg, 1964)
- Gisela Elsner, The Giant Dwarfs (Grove Press, 1965)
- Paul Marc Henry, Africa Aeterna: The Pictorial Chronicle of a Continent (Sedo S.A., 1965)
- Jean Lacouture, Vietnam: Between Two Truces, trans. w. Kellen Konrad (Vintage Books/Random House, 1966)
- Willy Brandt, A Peace Policy for Europe (Holt, Rinehart & Winston, 1968)

== See also ==
- List of Islamic scholars
