= Augustus Hopkins Strong =

American theologian (1836–1921)

Pastor Augustus Hopkins Strong
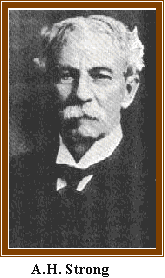
- Born: August 3, 1836; Rochester, New York, U.S.
- Died: November 29, 1921 (aged 85); Pasadena, California, U.S.
- Education: Yale College
- Occupation: Seminary president

Augustus Hopkins Strong (3 August 1836 – 29 November 1921) was a Baptist minister and theologian who lived in the United States during the late 19th and early 20th centuries. His most influential book, Systematic Theology, proved to be a mainstay of Baptist theological education.

== Early life and education ==
Augustus Hopkins Strong was born on August 3, 1836, in Rochester, New York. He was a descendant of "Elder John Strong, of Northampton, Massachusetts." His grandfather was a "physician of considerable eminence", who moved from Warren, Connecticut, to Scipio, New York, in 1799, then to Rochester in 1821. His father, Alvah Strong, was the printer of such early Rochester newspapers as the Anti-Masonic Enquirer, the Morning Advertiser, and the Weekly Republican, before becoming the longtime proprietor of The Daily Democrat. Both his father and eldest uncle were deacons of the First Baptist Church of Rochester, and helped found the Rochester Theological Seminary (RTS), in 1850, the institution over which he would later preside. RTS would later become Colgate Rochester Crozer Divinity School.

Strong's younger brother, Henry A. Strong, was a successful businessman and philanthropist who served as Eastman Kodak's first president. His youngest uncle became a Forty-niner in the California Gold Rush, after losing both his wife and infant son. A first cousin twice removed, Theodore C. Achilles would later become a diplomat, another such cousin would marry Margaret Woodbury Strong, and a niece would marry George R. Carter.

After Strong graduated from Yale College in 1857, he took a year to travel Europe, before he began his theological studies at RTS.

== Career ==
In August 1861, Strong was named pastor of First Baptist Church, Haverhill, Massachusetts. After his four-year pastorate there, became pastor of First Baptist Church, Cleveland, Ohio, from 1865 to 1872, and thereafter became president of RTS.

It was during his time as president that he wrote his Systematic Theology, which was the main textbook of Protestant seminaries in North America. He received honorary doctorates from Rochester, Alfred, Brown, Bucknell, Princeton, and Yale Universities.

== Personal life ==
Strong was married, and his eldest son was the American psychologist and philosopher Charles A. Strong.

He died on Tuesday, November 29, 1921 in Pasadena, California, after which his body was returned to Rochester, where he was laid to rest in the week following, at Mount Hope Cemetery on December 5, in his family's vault, after lying in state in Alvah Strong Hall at the Seminary. Among others, Strong was eulogized by Rush Rhees, then president of the University of Rochester, and by Clarence A. Barbour, a succeeding president of the Seminary.

== Theology ==
Strong held to a form of inclusivism, that is, he believed that some people from non-Christian religions actually believe in the one true God, the God revealed in the Bible. Thus, it was Strong's view that their faith in God – to the limits of their knowledge and their rejection of the religion around them – constituted "an implicit faith in Christ."

=== Triadology ===
A.H Strong asserted that the unity of the trinity is not like the unity of three persons among men, since men have only a specific unity of nature, being one species. However, within God the persons of the trinity have a numerical unity of nature, having the same essence. Thus, he asserted that within God the undivided essence belongs equally to each of the three persons, the plurality of the Godhead being a plurality of personal distinctions and not a plurality of essence, the one essence having three modes of subsistence.

Strong asserted the eternal sonship of Christ to be scriptural. Stating that the Bible teaches both the doctrine of the eternal generation of the Son and the eternal procession of the Holy Spirit.

=== Atonement ===
Strong's Christology began with Christ's presence at the creation of the human couple. Christ's sacrifice for the human race was understood as a Divine sharing of human suffering, in particular the curse of original sin genetically passed through his mother, Mary. The curse of the genetic connection to Adam was prior to the sin that Christ voluntarily took as He died in the crucifixion.

== Selected works ==
- Strong, Augustus H. (1907) [1886]. Systematic Theology: The Doctrine of God. Vol. 1. American Baptist Pub. Society.
- Strong, Augustus H. (1907) [1886]. Systematic Theology: The Doctrine of Man. Vol. 2. American Baptist Pub. Society.
- Strong, Augustus H. (1909) [1886]. Systematic Theology: The Doctrine of Salvation. Vol. 3. American Baptist Pub. Society.
- Strong, Augustus H. (1888), Philosophy and Religion: a Series of Addresses, Essays and Sermons Designed to Set Forth Great Truths, New York: Armstrong, OCLC 1965895
- Strong, Augustus H. (1899), Christ in Creation and Ethical Monism, Philadelphia: The Roger Williams press, OCLC 3313848
- Strong, Augustus H. (1912), Miscellanies, Philadelphia: Griffith and Rowland, OCLC 759154
- Strong, Augustus H. (1914), Popular Lectures on the Books of the New Testament, Philadelphia: Griffith and Rowland, OCLC 3602324
- Strong, Augustus H. (1916), American poets and their theology, Philadelphia: Griffith and Rowland, ISBN 9780790596891, OCLC 448204
- Strong, Augustus H. (1918), A tour of the missions; observations and conclusions, Philadelphia: Griffith and Rowland Press, OCLC 2879076
- Strong, Augustus H. (1922), What Shall I Believe?: a Primer of Christian Theology, New York: F.H. Revell, OCLC 8393474
- Strong, Augustus H. (1922). Henry A. Ward: Reminiscence and Appreciation. Rochester Historical Society.

Academic offices
Preceded by Ezekiel G. Robinson	President of the Rochester Theological Seminary; 1872–1912	Succeeded by Joseph W. A. Stewart (acting)
