= Geoffrey Scott (architectural historian) =

English writer and architectural historian (1884–1929)

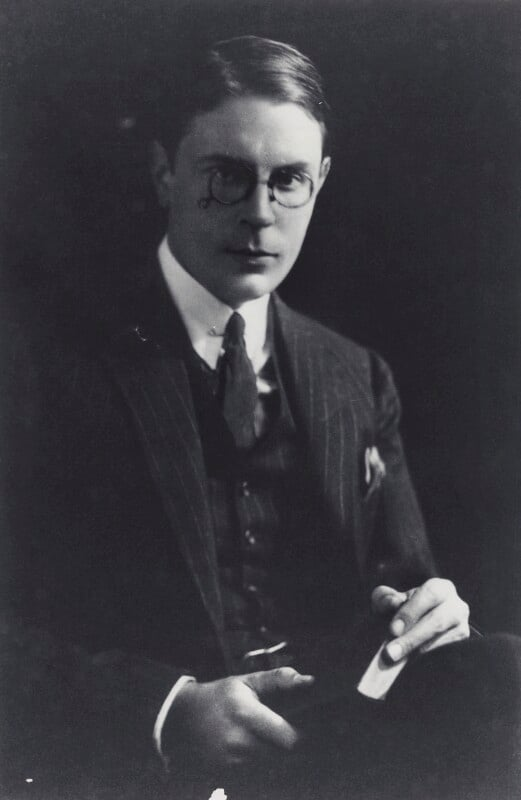
Scott in the early 1910s

Geoffrey Scott (11 June 1884 – 14 August 1929) was an English scholar and poet, known as a historian of architecture. His biography of Isabelle de Charrière entitled The Portrait of Zelide won the 1925 James Tait Black Memorial Prize.

== Background ==
Born in Hampstead, Scott was the fourth son of Russell Scott III and his wife Jessie Thurburn. He was educated at Highgate School, then Rugby School and New College, Oxford, where he won the Newdigate Prize in 1906. While still an undergraduate he was befriended by Mary Berenson, leading to his admission to the Florence 'circle' of Bernard Berenson. From 1907 to 1909 he was employed by Berenson; he worked on the design of the garden of I Tatti, the Berenson villa, with Cecil Ross Pinsent. This led to work on other gardens. It also brought him the friendship of John Maynard Keynes, who met him there.

In 1914 the publication of The Architecture of Humanism made his reputation. In 1916, he married Lady Sybil Cutting, whose first husband, William Bayard Cutting Jr., died in 1910. She had arrived in Florence when her first husband, terminally ill with tuberculosis, had written he wanted their young daughter, Iris, to grow up in Italy, "free from all this national feeling which makes people so unhappy. Bring her up somewhere where she does not belong." Lady Sybil and her daughter settled in Florence, Italy; buying the Villa Medici in Fiesole, one of the city's most spectacular villas. There she formed a close friendship with Bernard Berenson at the nearby I Tatti, and seasonal resident Lady Cecilia Pearse.

The Scotts divorced in 1926, and she remarried (to Percy Lubbock) the same year. With little in the way of career, it has been suggested that an unlikely love affair with Vita Sackville-West from 1923 to 1925 spurred Scott into his later literary production.

At the time of his death, of pneumonia in New York City, Geoffrey Scott had been retained as an editor of the papers of James Boswell.

He was one of Edith Wharton's close friends.

== Works ==
- The Architecture of Humanism: A Study in the History of Taste (1914)
- A Box of Paints (1923) poems
- The Portrait of Zélide (1925) biography of Isabelle de Charrière
- Poems (1931)
