= Charles Augustus Strong =

American philosopher, psychologist (1862–1940)

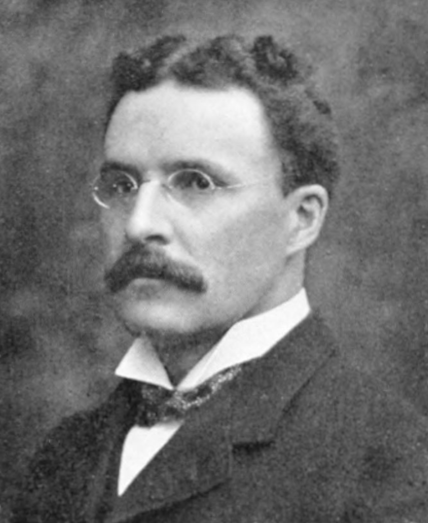
- Born: November 28, 1862; Haverhill, Massachusetts, U.S.
- Died: January 23, 1940 (aged 77); Fiesole, Italy
- Education: Rochester Theological Seminary; Phillips Exeter Academy; University of Rochester
- Spouse: Elizabeth Rockefeller Strong (m. 1889)
- Children: Margaret Rockefeller Strong
- Parent: Augustus Hopkins Strong

Charles Augustus Strong (November 28, 1862 – January 23, 1940) was an American philosopher and psychologist. He spent the earlier part of his career teaching in the United States, but after his wife died, in 1906 he settled with their daughter in Italy, near Florence. Between 1918 and 1936 he wrote most of his works there.

== Early life and education ==
Charles Augustus Strong was born in the United States on November 28, 1862, at Haverhill, Massachusetts. He was the eldest son of Augustus Hopkins Strong and his wife.

In 1865 his father moved the family to Cleveland, Ohio, where they became acquainted with the family of John D. Rockefeller. Strong was educated as a youth at the Rochester Theological Seminary, where his father was president. He studied in higher grades at Phillips Exeter Academy in Exeter, New Hampshire. Strong was a student of Latin and Greek, and edited the school paper. In July 1881 he travelled to Germany, where he studied at the Gütersloh Gymnasium.

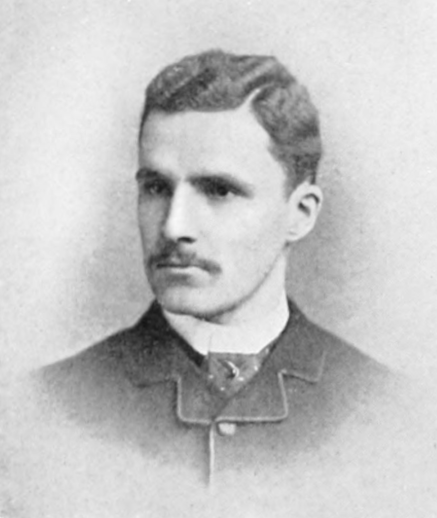
At Harvard, c. 1885

In 1883 Strong returned to America and entered the University of Rochester, where he received an AB in 1884 and an LLD in 1919. Strong graduated from Harvard in 1885 with a second AB. At Harvard he was influenced by philosopher and psychologist, William James, and became friends with George Santayana; and together they founded the Harvard Philosophical Club.

From 1885 to 1886 he returned to the Rochester Theological Seminary, which his father still led. In 1886 Strong headed to Berlin with George Santayana on a James Walker Fellowship from Harvard. Strong turned away from a career as a clergyman. In Berlin he studied psychology, philosophy, and physiology with professors Carl Stumpf and Friedrich Paulsen.

== Career ==
On his return to America, Strong worked part-time as an instructor in philosophy at Cornell University. In 1889 he went to Paris, Freiburg and Berlin. In 1890, Strong became a docent at Clark University. In 1892 he was appointed associate professor of psychology at the University of Chicago. Chicago's first psychological laboratories were set up by Strong in 1893.

Strong moved on to Columbia University, where he lectured in psychology until 1903, and from 1903 to 1910 was a professor of psychology. In 1903 he authored his first work, Why the Mind Has a Body.

== Organizations ==
He was a member of the Century Club of New York.

== Philosophy ==
In The Origin of Consciousness (1918), Strong advocated a form of panpsychism. The book expanded on William Kingdon Clifford's mind-stuff theory. Philosopher David Skrbina has noted that "Strong stands out as one of the more consistent and open advocates of panpsychism in the first part of the century."

== Personal life ==
On March 22, 1889, Strong married Bessie, the eldest of four daughters of John D. Rockefeller and his wife Laura Celestia "Cettie" Spelman (1839–1915).

In 1906, after the death of his wife, Strong moved with his daughter Margaret to Fiesole, Italy, near Florence. He wrote his most influential works while living there. He died on January 23, 1940, near his Villa Le Balze, in Fiesole. His daughter, Margaret Rockefeller Strong, left the villa to Georgetown University for the establishment there of the Charles August Strong Center for Scholarship.

== Publications ==
- Why the Mind Has a Body (1903)
- The Origin of Consciousness (1918)
- Essays in Critical Realism (1920)
- The Wisdom of the Beasts (1921)
- A Theory of Knowledge (1923)
- Essays on the Natural Origin of the Mind (1930)
- A Creed for Sceptics (1936)
