= Episcopal Palace, Fiesole =

Italian episcopal palace

Coordinates: 43°48′26.94″N 11°17′31.14″E

Episcopal Palace
- Palazzo Vescovile (Italian)
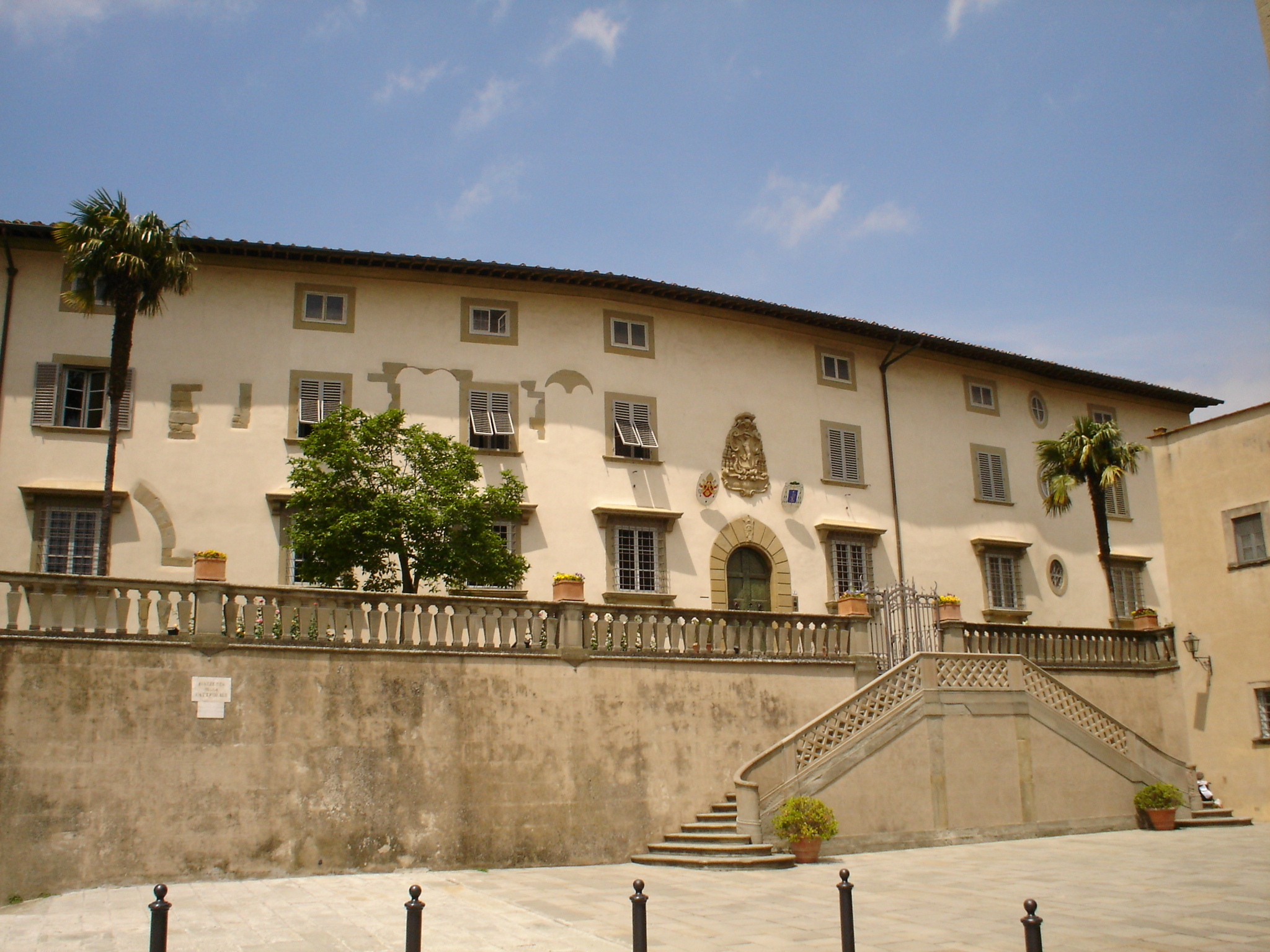
- Façade of the Episcopal Palace

Religion
- Affiliation: Catholic Church

Location
- Location: Fiesole, Tuscany
- Country: Italy
- Interactive map of Episcopal Palace
- Administration: Diocese of Fiesole

Architecture
- Completed: 1028

The Episcopal Palace (Italian: Palazzo Vescovile) is a building located in Piazza Mino of Fiesole, Italy. Built in the eleventh century, it serves as the residence of the Bishop of Fiesole.

== History ==
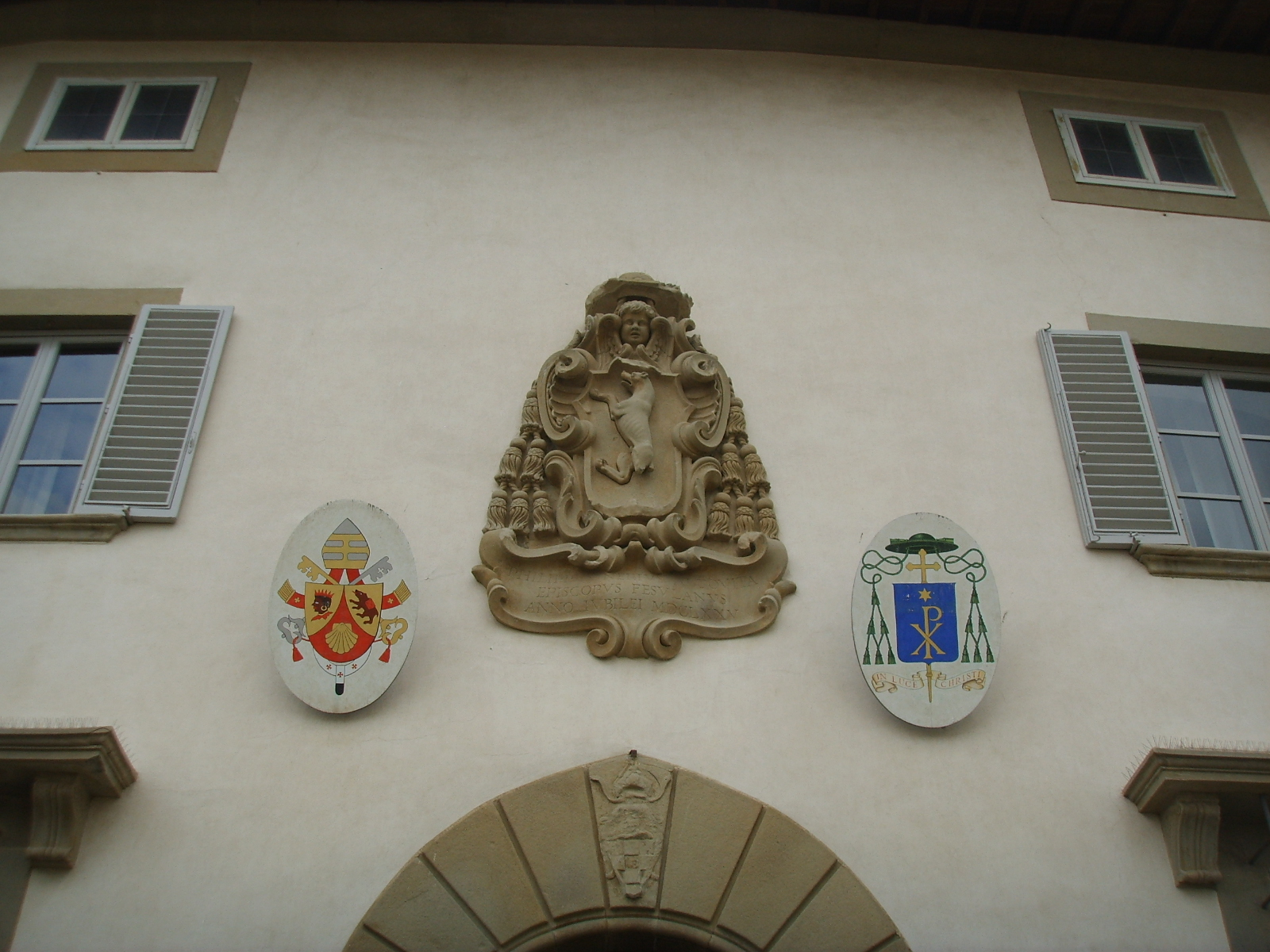
Closeup of the coat of arms above the entrance

At the front of the Episcopal Palace is a double staircase constructed in the 19th century. The palace was built contemporaneously with the adjacent Fiesole Cathedral in 1028, under the episcopate of Bishop Jacopo Bavaro. Over time, the palace was modified and expanded.

In the fourteenth century, the palace was enlarged by Bishop Andrew Corsini, and subsequently by Bishops Francesco Maria Ginori and Cattani da Diacceto. The coat of arms of Bishop Filippo Neri Altoviti is prominently positioned above the entrance to the palace due to his expansion. The current façade dates to 1500.

Inside the palace is the bishop's private chapel, which contains frescoes in the Ghirlandaio school from the late 15th century, depicting Saint Romulus, Saint James, and God the Father.

Also inside is the Oratory of San Jacopo Maggiore, which was built by Bishop Cattani da Diacceto. In it is a piece by Lorenzo di Bicci depicting the Coronation of the Virgin. There are also paintings by Niccodemo Ferrucci and Antonio Marini.

To the right of the Episcopal Palace is a rectory that was built in 1032 to house the canons of the cathedral next door. In 1439, it was expanded, adding a courtyard surrounded by an arcade and a marble column in the center with a small, metal image of Maria Santissima, which was commissioned by Bishop Ranieri Mancini.

In the palace's garden are the remains of an Etruscan wall that continues into the garden of the adjacent Diocesan Seminary, which once supported the lower circle of the acropolis on which the San Francesco Monastery now resides.

== See also ==
- Fiesole Cathedral
- Diocesan Seminary of Fiesole
- Church of Santa Maria Primerana
- San Francesco Monastery (Fiesole)
