= Villa San Girolamo =

Coordinates: 43°48′22.7″N 11°17′20.2″E

- Chiesa di San Girolamo (Italian)
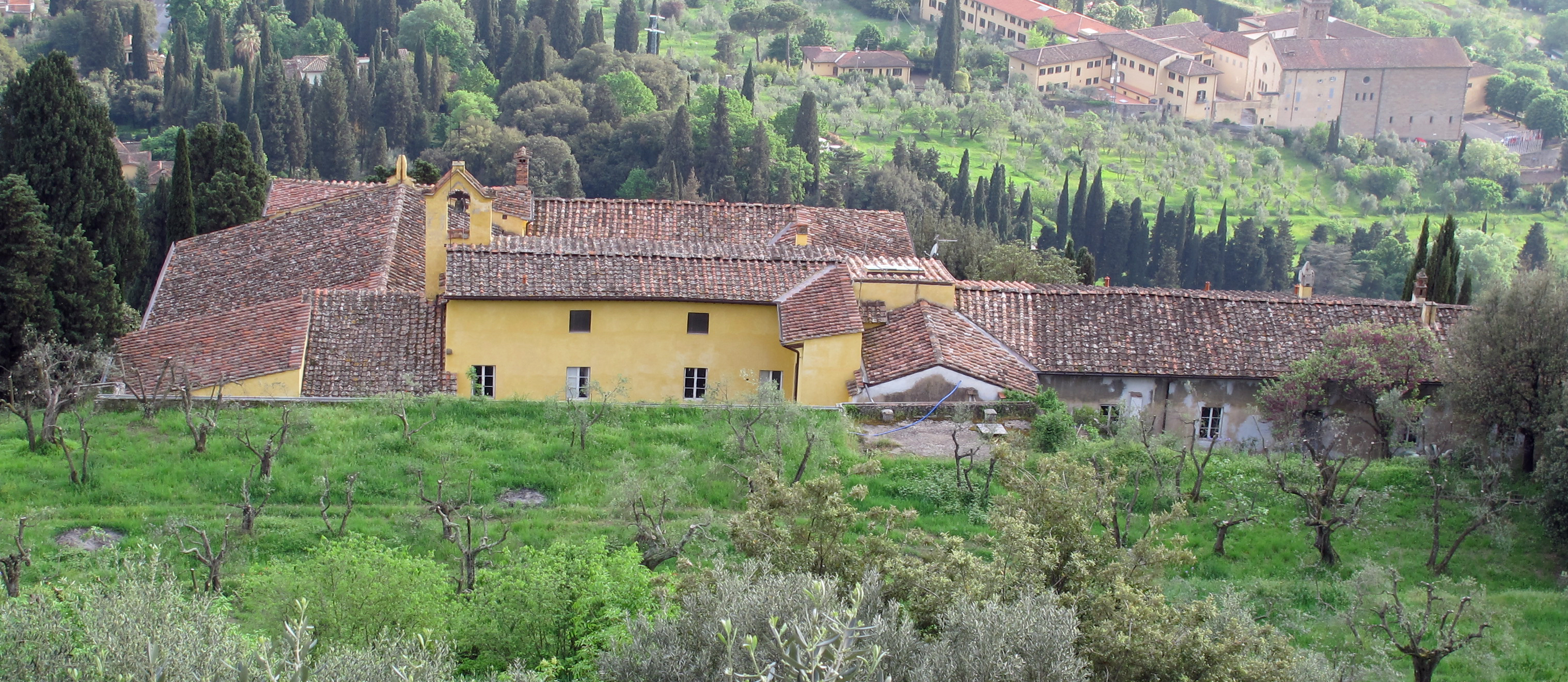
- The current Villa San Girolamo
- Villa San Girolamo
- Location: Via Vecchia Fiesolana, 12, Fiesole, Tuscany
- Country: Italy
- Denomination: Catholic Church

History
- Dedication: Saint Jerome

Architecture
- Functional status: Former church
- Architect(s): Michelozzo, Matteo Nigetti
- Completed: 14th century

Administration
- Diocese: Fiesole

The Villa San Girolamo, sometimes known as the Church of San Girolamo, is a building complex that includes a villa, olive grove, and former Catholic monastery and church located on Via Vecchia Fiesolana in Fiesole, Tuscany.

== History ==
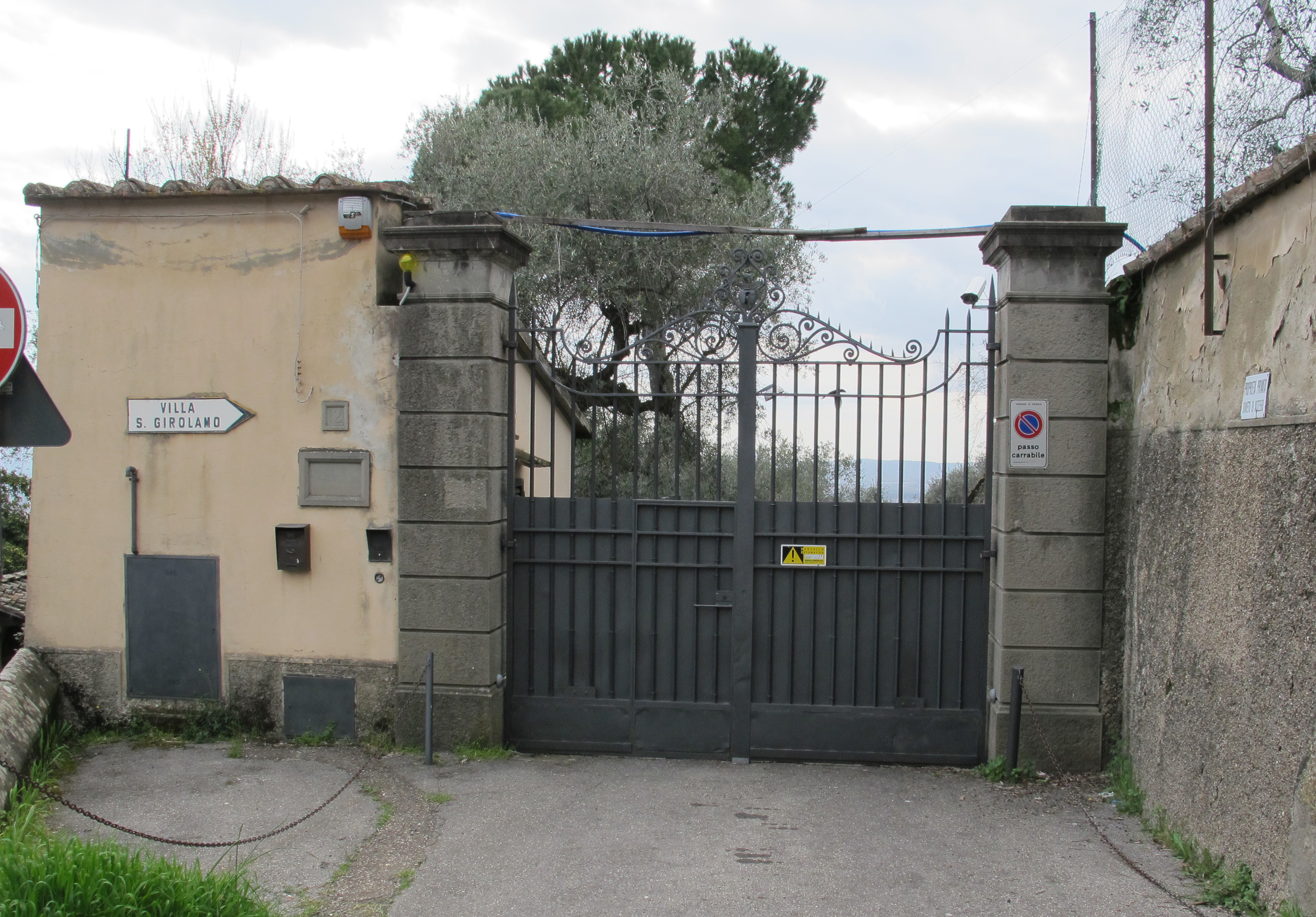
Gated entrance as it appears in 2013

Built in the 14th century as a hermitage and the seat of the cloistered order of Hieronymites, the church of San Girolamo came under the ownership of the Augustinians in the 15th century. It was expanded between 1445 and 1451 by Michelozzo at the behest of Cosimo de' Medici along with the neighboring Villa Medici.

The complex was then remodeled in the 17th century, though the cloister remained unchanged. During the 17th century, the monastery fell into disuse and ownership was transferred out of the Church and into private hands. It was then annexed by the nearby Villa dei Ricasoli.

At the entrance of the building is a portico of three arches supported by columns built by Matteo Nigetti in 1633. Inside is a large fresco by Luigi Sabatelli depicting Saint Jerome (San Girolamo), after which the monastery is named. The main altar was also designed by Nigetti in 1661, where there is a canvas by Giovanni Domenico Cerrini depicting the Assumption of the Virgin Mary. In the floor are two headstones, one a porphyry medallion of Francesco del Tadda, and the other of the Rucellai family, dating to 1478.

San Girolamo became the seat of the Jesuit Superior General and the Jesuit curia in July 1865.

In 1911, Charles Augustus Strong visited Villa San Girolamo and briefly stayed there. He was so impressed by its views of Florence that he decided to build Villa Le Balze directly beneath it.

From 1889 until around 2005, the villa was run by nuns of the Little Company of Mary, who originally used the villa as a nursing home and later to provide room and board to pilgrims, visitors, and students for a small fee. The use of the villa as an inn by the nuns was shut down by the mayor of Fiesole in 1998, who said that the nuns were using it as an unauthorized hotel. Michael Ondaatje's 1992 novel, The English Patient was set in Villa San Girolamo. For some time, the villa was used as a springtime vacation home by Scottish nationalist historian John Lorne Campbell and his American wife Margaret Fay Shaw, and was where Campbell died.

== See also ==
- Villa Le Balze
- Fiesole Cathedral
- Villa Medici in Fiesole
- San Francesco Monastery (Fiesole)
- Diocesan Seminary of Fiesole
- List of Jesuit sites
