= Diocesan Seminary of Fiesole =

Italian Catholic seminary

- Seminario Vescovile di Fiesole (Italian)
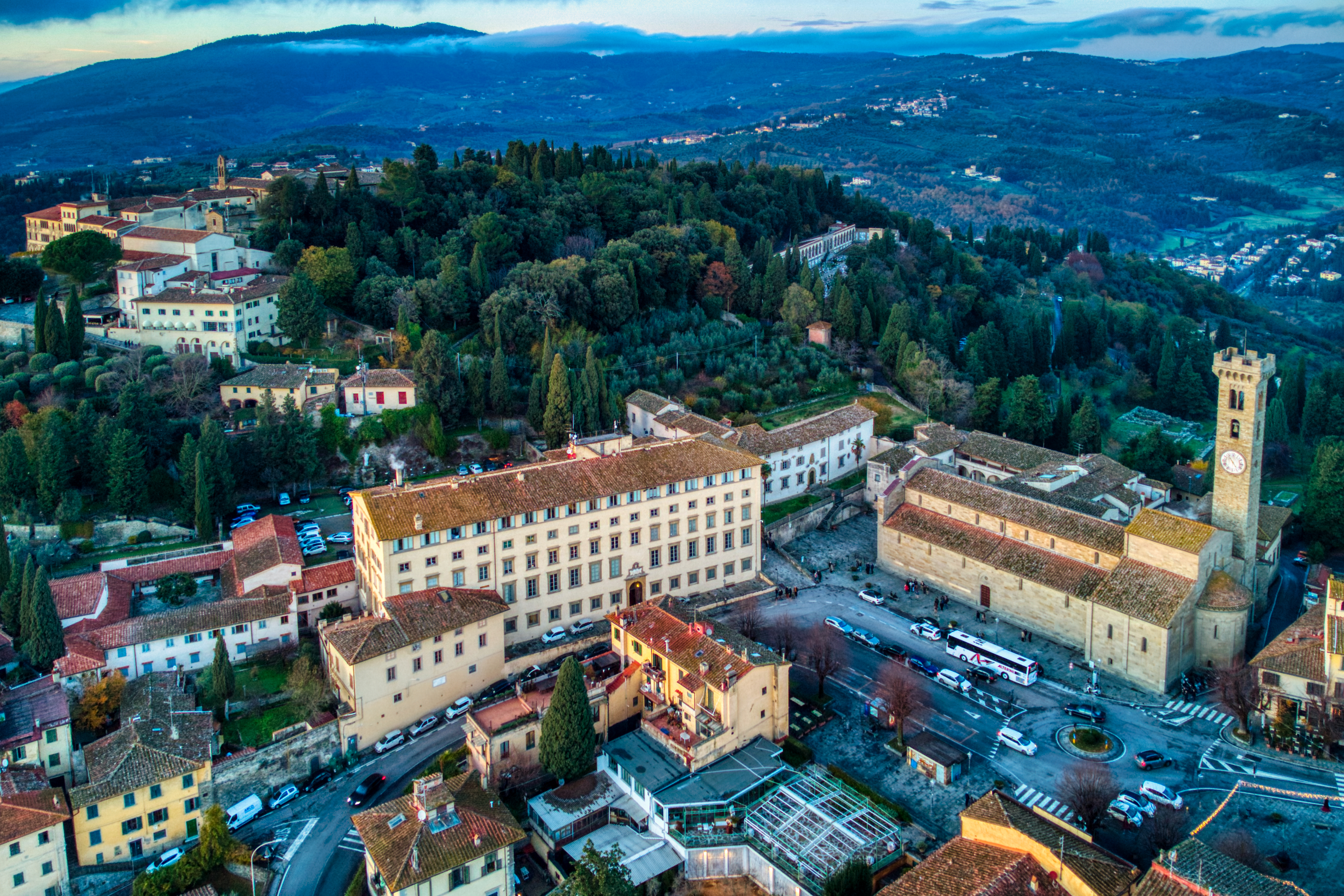
- The seminary (center-left) alongside the episcopal palace and cathedral
- Type: Major seminary
- Established: 1637
- Affiliations: Diocese of Fiesole
- Religious affiliation: Catholic Church
- Location: Piazza Mino da Fiesole, 1, Fiesole, Tuscany, 50014, Italy; 43°48′25″N 11°17′30″E

The Diocesan Seminary of Fiesole (Italian: Seminario Vescovile di Fiesole) is a former Roman Catholic seminary in Fiesole, Italy. Founded in the 17th century, the seminary is run by the Roman Catholic Diocese of Fiesole. Today, the seminary retains several pieces of historically significant art and library collections.

== History ==
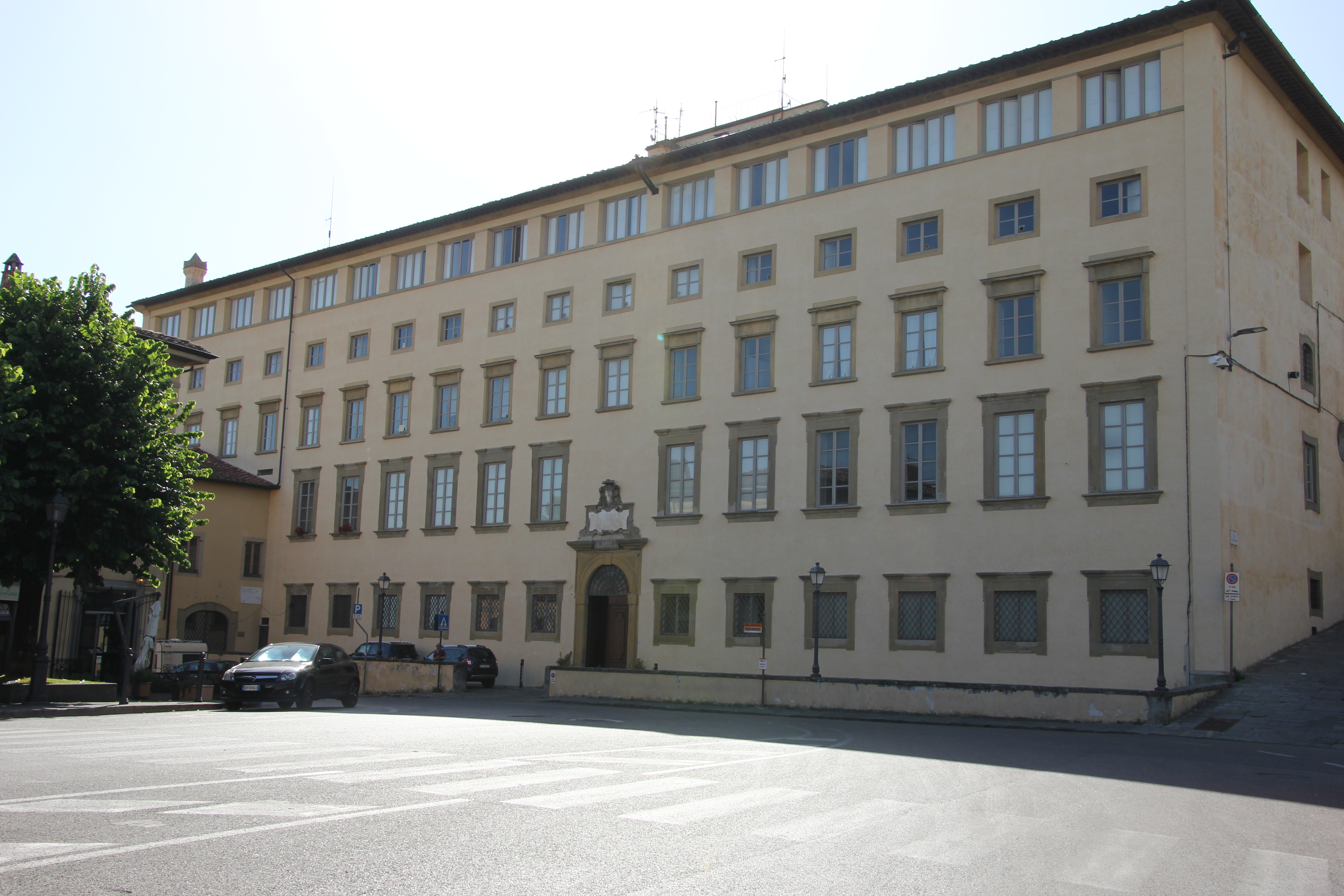
Front of the seminary in Piazza Mino

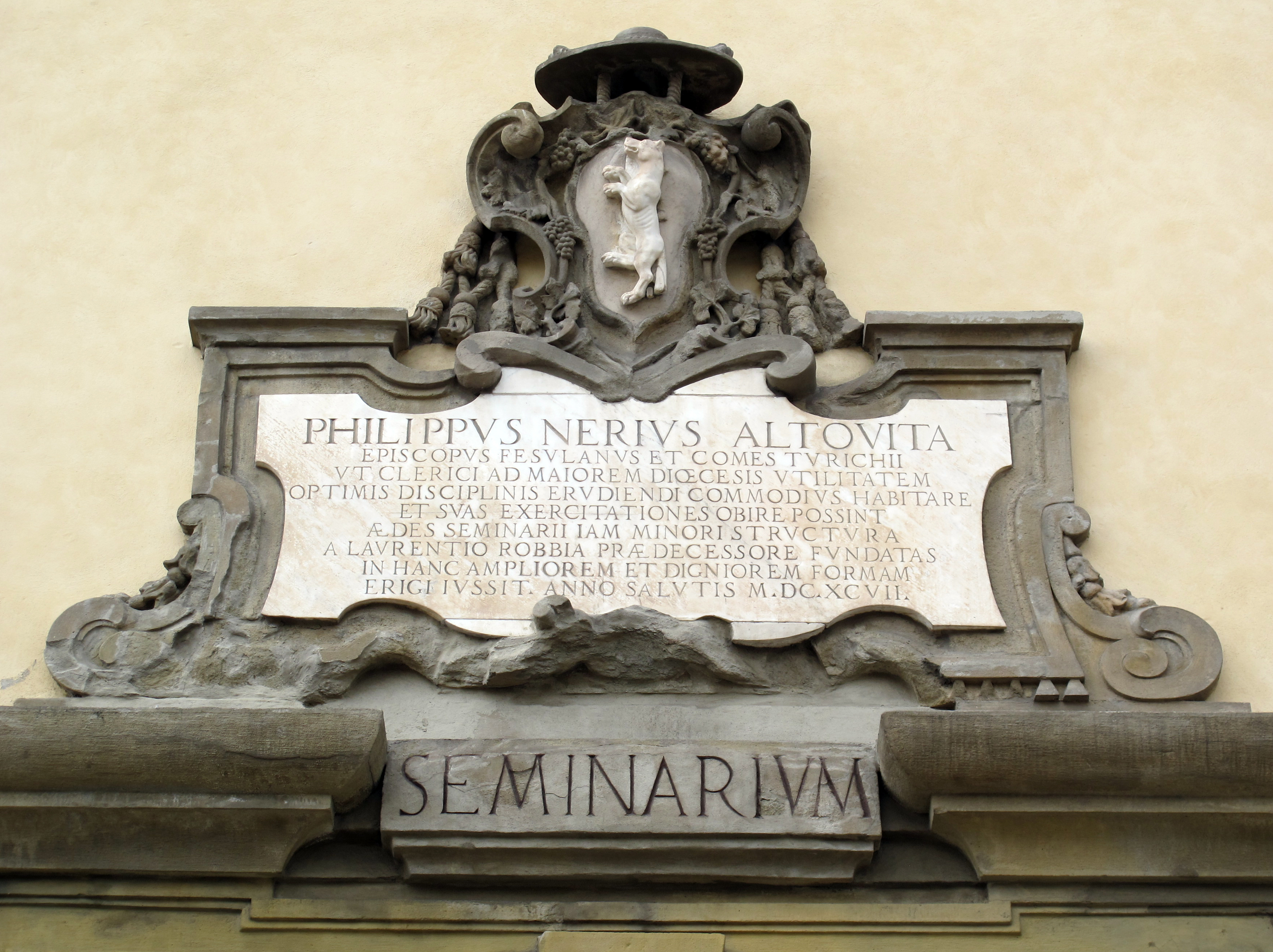
Latin inscription above entrance

Plans for a seminary originated with Francesco Cattani, the Bishop of Fiesole, in 1585. He intended to open the seminary in the Oratory of Santa Maria a Ponterosso, in the Florentine comune of Figline e Incisa Valdarno. However, a dispute over ownership of the oratory, which lasted until 1641, arose between the bishop and Pope Urban VIII. Eventually, possession of the oratory was returned to the diocese, but the seminary was established in its current location.

The seminary at Fiesole was founded in 1637 by Bishop Lorenzo della Robbia, with the intention of training priests in the newly formed precepts of the Council of Trent. Pope Urban VIII instituted the seminary's constitutio two years later.

=== Curriculum ===
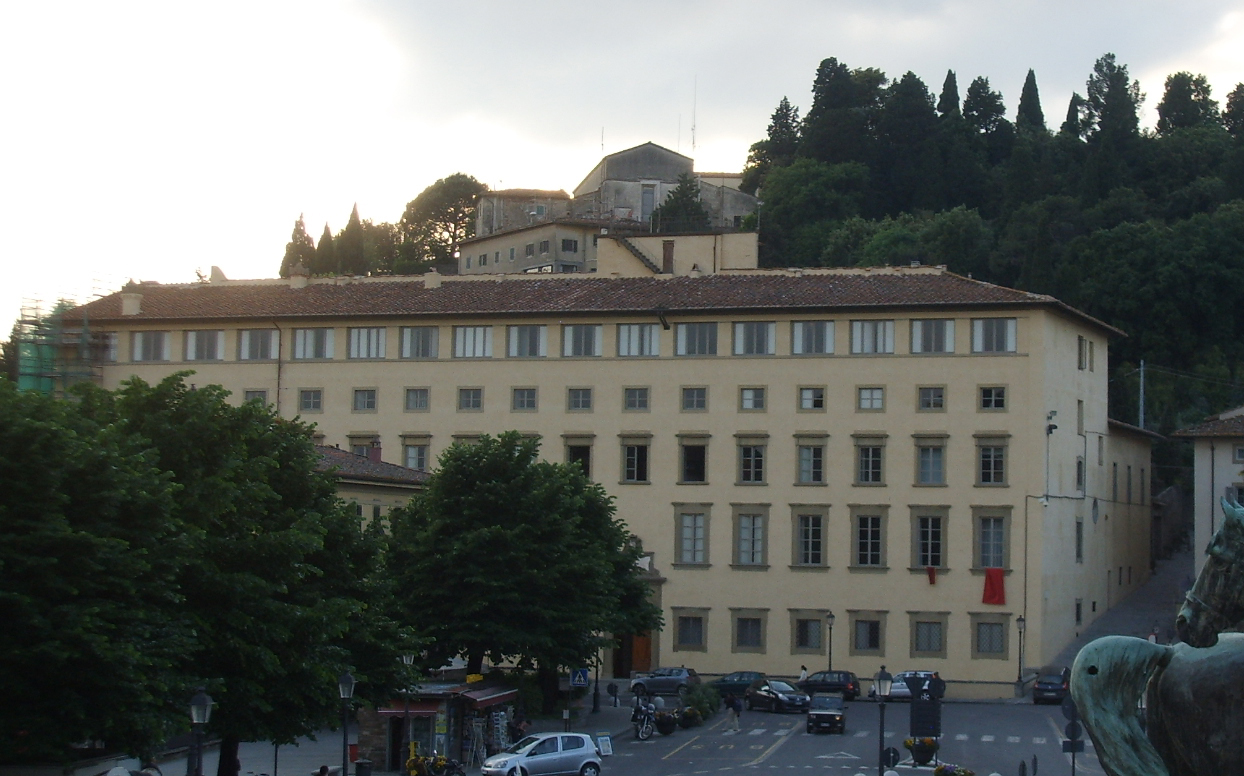
Façade of the seminary

Della Robbia, who was educated at the Jesuit Roman College, designed the seminary's curriculum to include writing and grammar (as many of the arriving students would be illiterate), humanities (which meant history and poetry), rhetoric, philosophy, cases of conscience, and singing. This departed from the subjects of study prescribed by the Catechism of the Council of Trent, as it did not include the study of Sacred Scripture or administration of the Sacraments other than Confession. While academic theology was taught informally, the primary focus of the theological curriculum was pastoral cura animarum.

Though the seminary was diocesan in nature (rather than religious), there was a strong influence of the Society of Jesus on the curriculum, as indicated by the fact that a large percentage of the library's collection was written by Jesuit authors and that many of the faculty were Jesuit-trained, resulting in a Jesuit bent to the theology taught. While not as rigorous, the Fiesole seminary's curriculum was influenced by the Jesuit Ratio Studiorum, which was significantly more rigorous than the standard curriculum of other diocesan seminaries at the time. Graduating students of the seminary even participated in the annual Spiritual Exercises of Ignatius until the 17th century.

This Jesuit influence appears to have waned after the end of Bishop della Robbia's episcopate. While he was bishop, the connection between the seminary and the Society of Jesus seems to have been atypically stronger than that between the Society and other diocesan seminaries worldwide and even in Italy, where the connection was strongest.

=== Facilities ===
The building, constructed under Lorenzo della Robbia, the final descendant of the prominent Della Robbia family, was smaller than it stands today. It was expanded in 1697 by Bishop Filippo Neri degli Altoviti and in 1726 by Bishop Luigi Maria Strozzi. The building encloses the western side of the Piazza Mino, the main piazza of Fiesole, on which the Cathedral of Fiesole also resides. Beneath the building are ruins of an ancient Roman forum, which were discovered during construction.

In 1782, an altarpiece which dates to 1520 and was created by Giovanni della Robbia was moved from the Church of Saint Peter in the Petrognano frazione of Barberino Val d'Elsa and installed in the eighteenth century chapel. It depicts the Virgin Mary crowned by angels and amidst Saints Peter, Donatus, John the Baptist, and Romulus. On the bottom is a nativity scene of Saint John the Baptist, Saint Peter being released from prison, Saint Romulus and a well, and Saint Donatus and a wolf. In addition, there is a work by Luciano Guarnieri titled Il Vangelo di Venturino, which consists of 45 panels depicting the life of Jesus Christ. There is also a tabernacle by Amalia Ciardi Dupré.

Over the years, many of Fiesole's bishops supported the seminary. Scientific equipment for studying physics, chemistry, and natural history were added in the nineteenth century. A library was also established with the donation of Bishop Luigi Maria Strozzi's library in 1721. The collection was then supplemented by the donation of Angelo Maria Bandini's personal collection in 1803.

For this reason, the seminary became one of the most important places of education in the area. While the vast majority of its graduates were priests incardinated in the Diocese of Fiesole, it did educate some priests from neighboring dioceses, particularly from the Archdiocese of Florence, in addition to laymen. Among the many students of the Fiesole seminary was the future Cardinal Antonio Innocenti.

Operations of the seminary were discontinued in 1970.

== See also ==
- Fiesole Cathedral
- San Francesco Monastery (Fiesole)
- Church of San Girolamo
- Episcopal Palace, Fiesole
