= Fiesole =

Town and comune of Florence, in Tuscany, Italy

- Comune
- Città di Fiesole
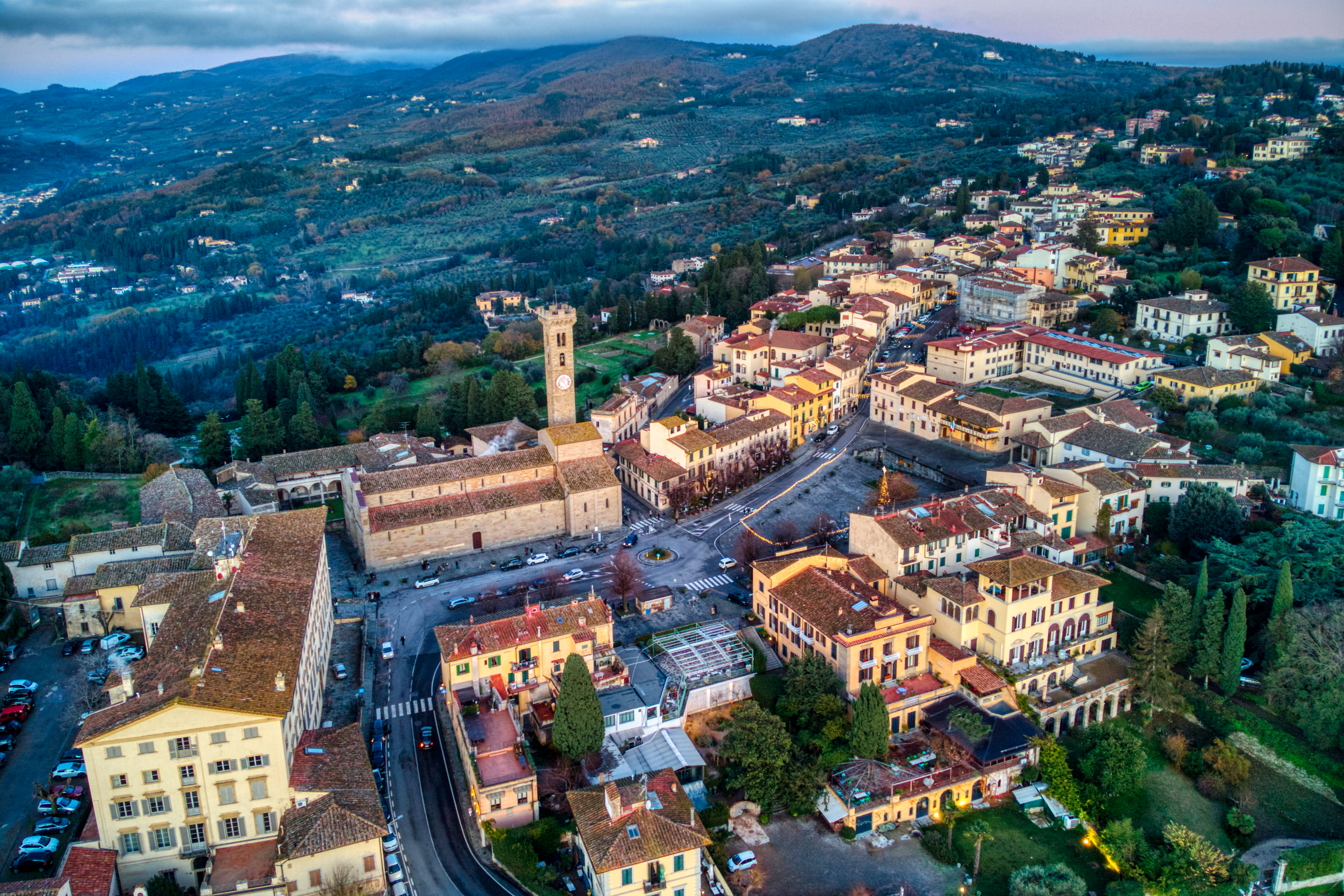
- Aerial view of Piazza Mino, the main square of Fiesole

- Coat of arms

- Location within Italy Location within Tuscany
- Coordinates: 43°48′26″N 11°17′31″E
- Country: Italy
- Region: Tuscany
- Metropolitan city: Florence (FI)
- Frazioni: Anchetta, Caldine, Compiobbi, Ellera, Girone, Pian del Mugnone, Pian di San Bartolo, San Domenico

Government
  - Mayor: Anna Ravoni

Area
  - Total: 42 km^{2} (16 sq mi)
- Elevation: 295 m (968 ft)

Population (31 December 2014)
  - Total: 14,075
  - Density: 340/km^{2} (870/sq mi)
- Demonym: Fiesolani
- Time zone: UTC+1 (CET)
  - Summer (DST): UTC+2 (CEST)
- Postal code: 50014
- Dialing code: 055
- ISTAT code: 048015
- Patron saint: Romulus of Fiesole
- Saint day: 6 July
- Website: Official website

Fiesole (Italian pronunciation: [ˈfjɛːzole]) is a town and comune of the Metropolitan City of Florence in the Italian region of Tuscany, on a scenic height above Florence, 5 km (3 miles) northeast of that city. It has structures dating to Etruscan and Roman times.

Founded in the seventh century BC as Vipsul, the city became one of the most important and earliest urban centres of the Etruscan civilisation. Since the fourteenth century, Fiesole has been a favoured retreat for prominent Florentines: Boccaccio set parts of his work in its hills, and in the fifteenth century the Medici built a villa there. To this day, the town remains known for its expensive residential properties as well as its centuries-old villas and their formal gardens. The city is generally considered to be the wealthiest and most affluent suburb of Florence. In 2016, the city had the highest median family income in the whole of Tuscany.

Fiesole is a centre of higher education. The campus of the European University Institute is situated in the suburb and uses several historical buildings including the Badia Faesolina and the Villa Schifanoia. Additionally, the U.S. universities, Harvard, Georgetown, and Saint Mary's of Minnesota all maintain campuses at Fiesole.

== History ==
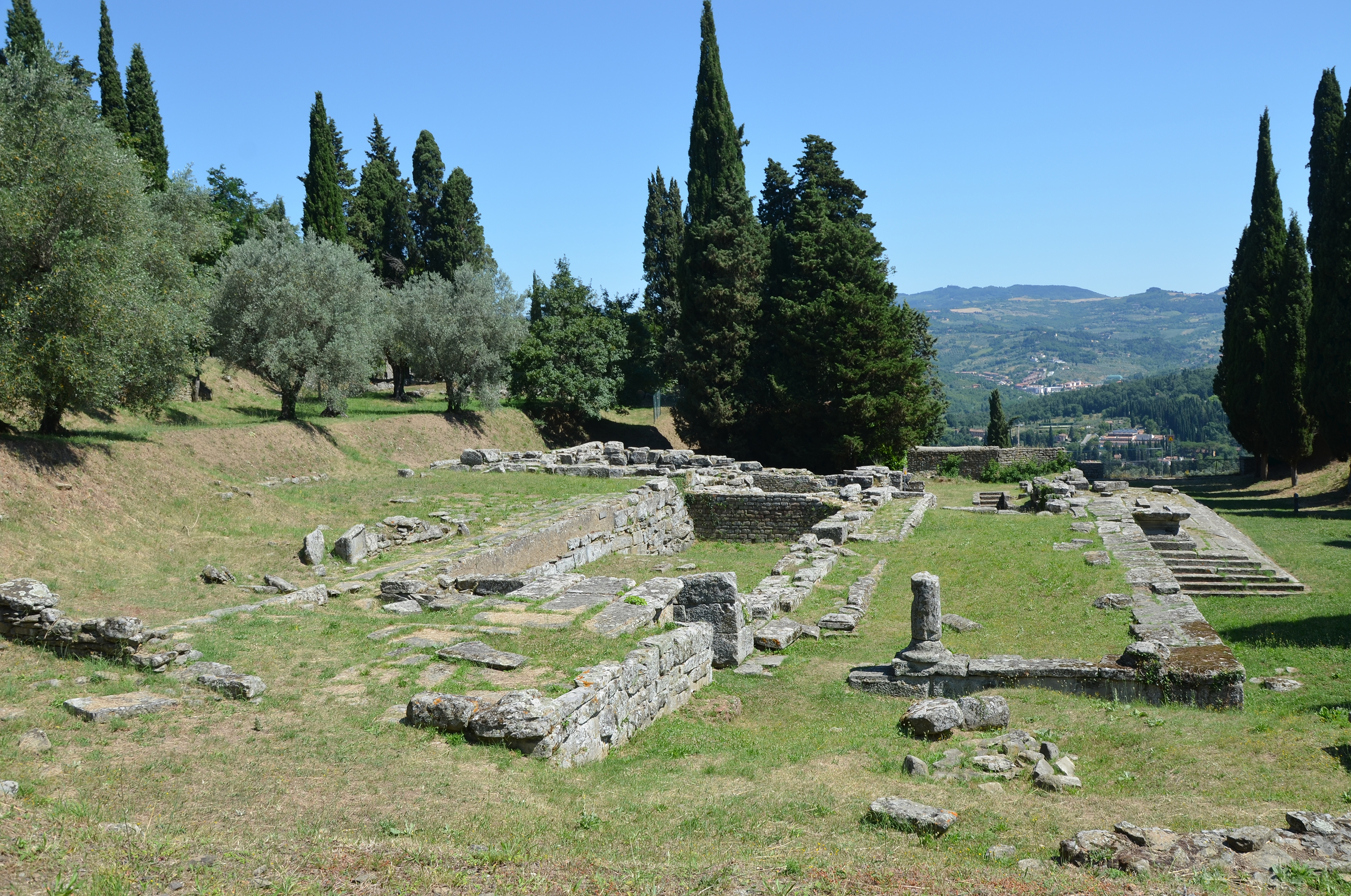
Excavation of the late-fourth-century BC Etruscan temple in Fiesole that later was used by the Romans

Fiesole (Latin Faesulae from the Etruscan Viesul, Viśl, Vipsul) was probably founded sometime during the ninth century BC, as it was an important member of the Etruscan confederacy. The remains of its prehistoric walls and ancient structures have been preserved and an archaeological museum in the town presents artifacts from and information about these cultural periods.

The earliest known recorded mention of the town dates to 283 BC, when the Etruscan town, then known as Faesulae, was conquered by the Romans. In Roman antiquity, it was the seat of a famous school of augurs and, every year, twelve young men were sent there from Rome to study the art of divination.

The old town was either destroyed in the Social War or alternatively by Sulla in 80 BC, in reprisal for supporting the populares faction in Rome. Sulla later colonized it with veterans. This colony who afterward, under the leadership of Gaius Mallius, supported the cause of Catilina.

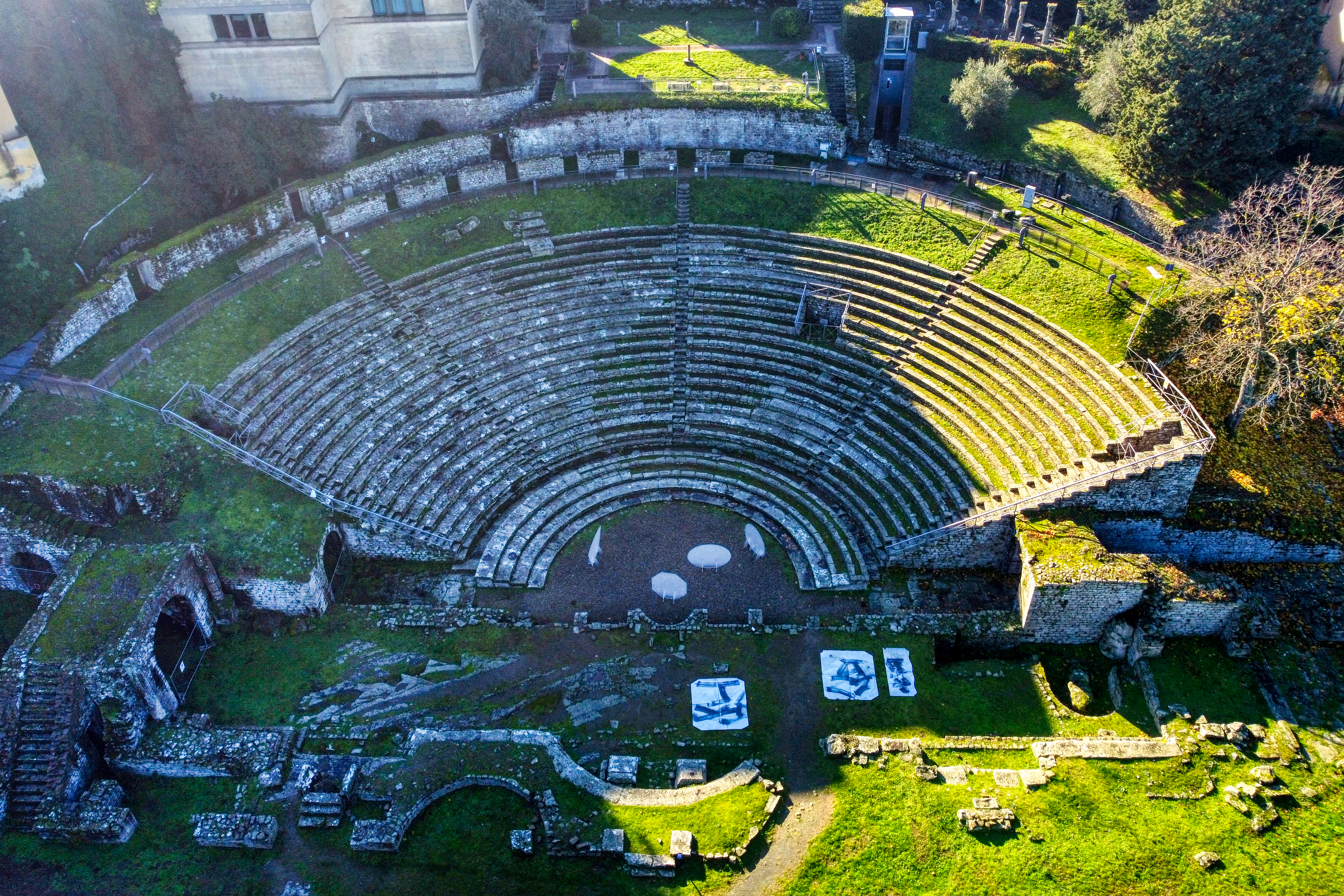
Partial restoration of one of the Roman structures in Fiesole

The Roman theatre, below the cathedral to the northeast, has 19 tiers of stone seats and is 37 yards (34 m) in diameter. It has been restored partially enough to provide a good idea of its structure. Above it is an embanking wall of irregular masonry, and below it some remains of Roman baths, including five parallel vaults of concrete. More than 1,000 silver denarii, all coined before 63 BC, were found at Faesulae in 1829. A small museum contains the objects found in the excavations of the theatre.

Fiesole was the scene of Stilicho's great victory over the Germanic hordes of the Vandals and Suebi under Radagaisus in 406. During the Gothic War (536–553), the town was besieged several times. In 539, Justin, the Byzantine general, captured it and razed its fortifications.

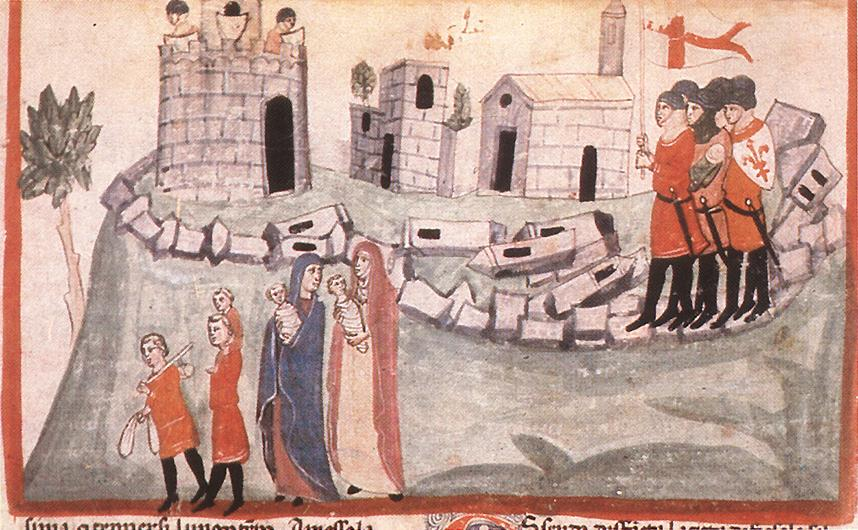
A fourteenth-century depiction from the Nuova Cronica showing the sacking of Fiesole in 1010, Chig.L.VIII.296 49v

It was an independent town for several centuries in the early Middle Ages, no less powerful than Florence in the valley below, and many wars arose between them. In 1010 and 1025, Fiesole was sacked by the Florentines. Later, it was conquered by Florence in 1125, when its leading families were obliged to take up their residence in Florence. Dante reflects this rivalry in his Divine Comedy by referring to "the beasts of Fiesole" (Inferno XV.73).

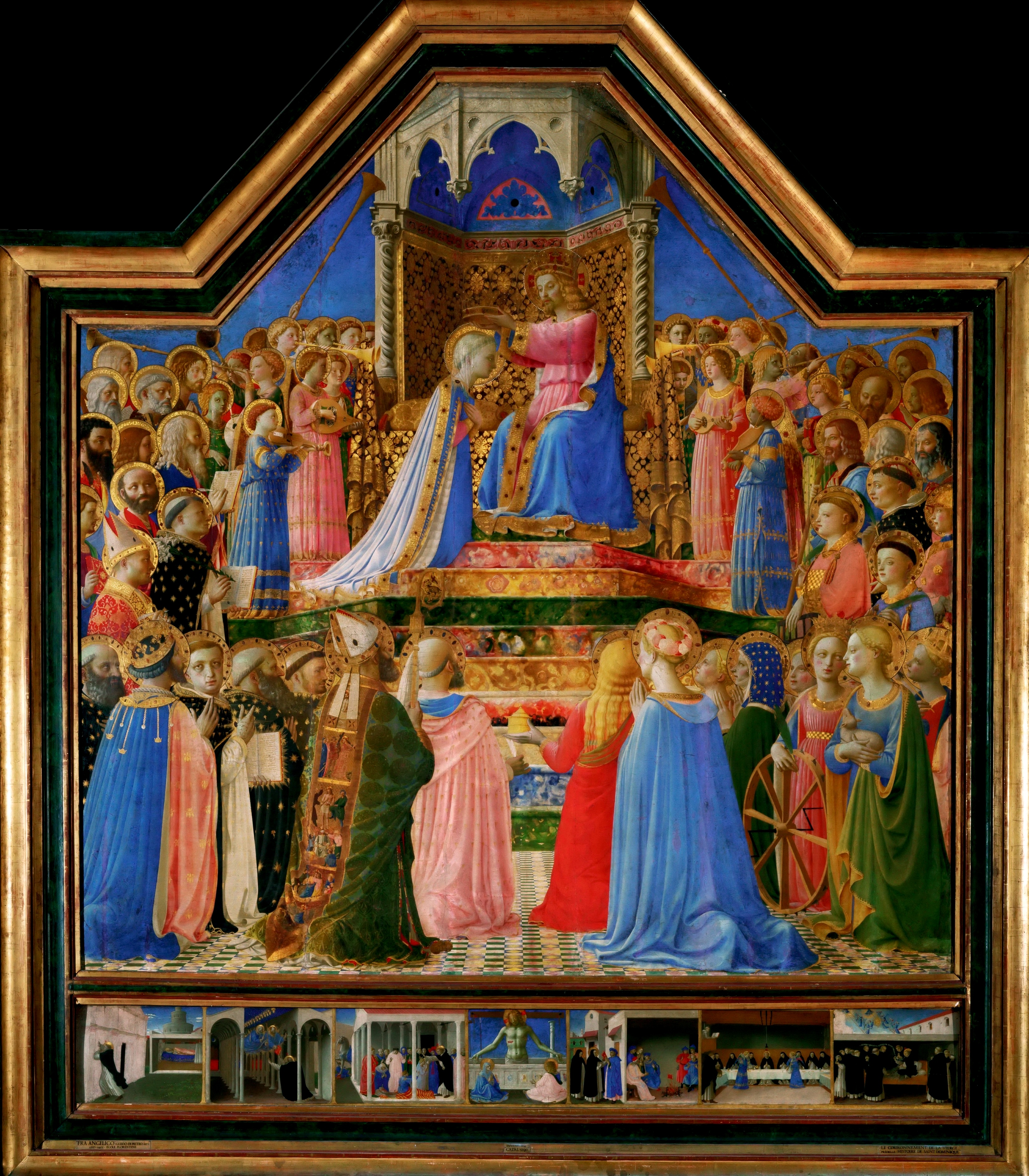
Fra Angelico’s depiction of the Coronation of the Virgin (1434–1435), originally in Fiesole, now at the Louvre in Paris

By the fourteenth century, rich Florentines had countryside villas in Fiesole, and one of them is the setting of the frame narrative of the Decameron. Boccaccio's poem Il Ninfale fiesolano is a mythological account of the origins of the community.

It is also documented that the artist and scientist Leonardo da Vinci experimented for the first time with early flying models on the hills of Fiesole.

== Main sites ==
- Remnants of Etruscan walls
- Roman baths
- Roman theatre
- Palazzo Pretorio (Praetorian Palace), also known as Palazzo Comunale (Town Hall), dating to the fourteenth century
- The Cathedral of Fiesole (Il Duomo) that contains the shrine of St. Romulus, martyr, according to legend the first Bishop of Fiesole, and that of his martyred companions; the shrine of St. Donatus of Fiesole; and its altarpiece by Pietro Perugino
- The Badia or ancient cathedral of St. Romulus, built in 1028 by Bishop Jacopo Bavaro with materials taken from several older edifices at the foot of the hill on which Fiesole stands and were supposed to cover the site of the martyrdom of St. Romulus. It contains notable sculptures by Mino da Fiesole; the old cathedral became a Benedictine abbey that passed into the hands of the Canons Regular of the Lateran. It once possessed a valuable library, long since dispersed. The abbey was closed in 1778

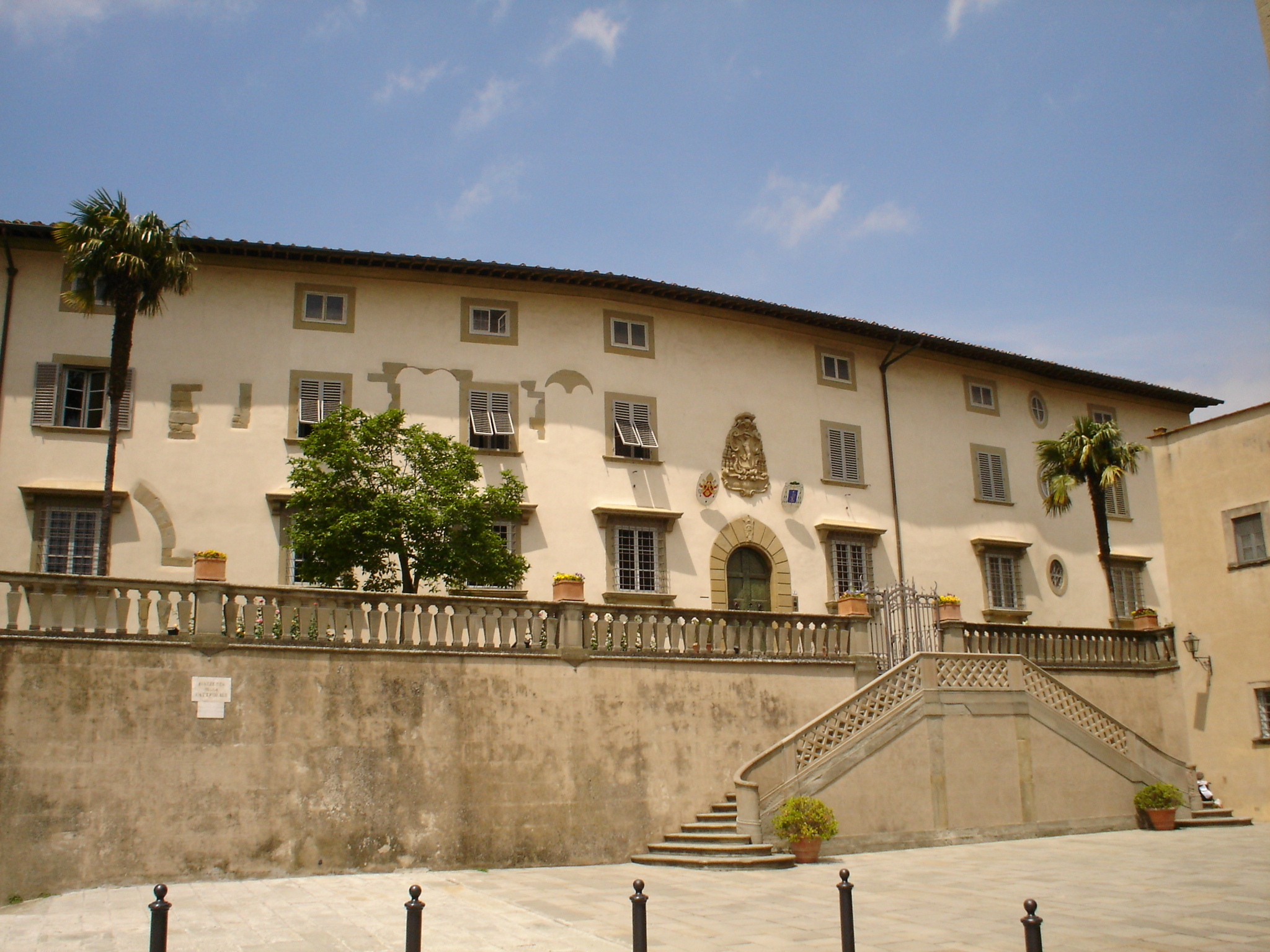
Episcopal Palace

- The room in the Episcopal Palace where Carmelite bishop St. Andrew Corsini lived and died
- The little Church of Santa Maria Primerana in the cathedral square, where the same saint was warned by Our Lady of his approaching death. Built in 996 and further expanded in medieval times, it has maintained the Gothic presbytery from that period. It received a new façade in the late sixteenth century, with graffito decoration by Ludovico Buti. The interior, on a single hall, has a thirteenth-century panel portraying Madonna with Child. In the transept are two marble bas-reliefs by Francesco da Sangallo and a terracotta from Andrea della Robbia's workshop.
- The Church of S. Alessandro, with the shrine of St. Alexander, bishop and martyr
- The Monastery of San Francesco on the crest of the hill, with the cells of St. Bernardine of Siena and seven Franciscan Beati
- Church of San Girolamo, the home of Venerable Carlo dei Conti Guidi, founder of the Hieronymites of Fiesole (1360)
- San Domenico, the novice-home of Fra Angelico and of St. Antoninus of Florence
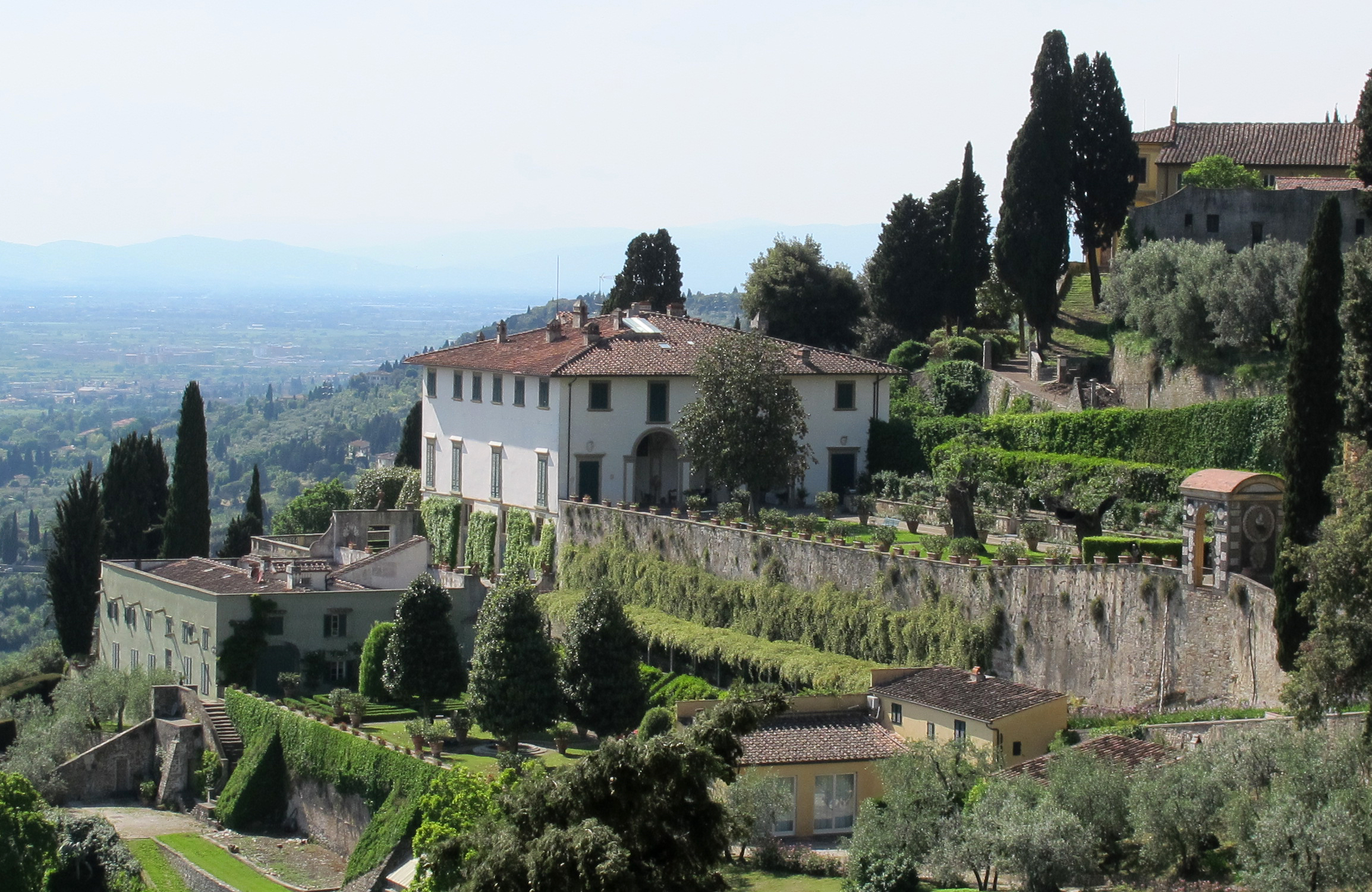
- The Villa Medici in Fiesole (1457), a UNESCO World Heritage site since 2013
  Fontanelle, a villa near S. Domenico, where St. Aloysius came to live in the hot summer months, while a page at the court of Grand Duke Francesco de' Medici

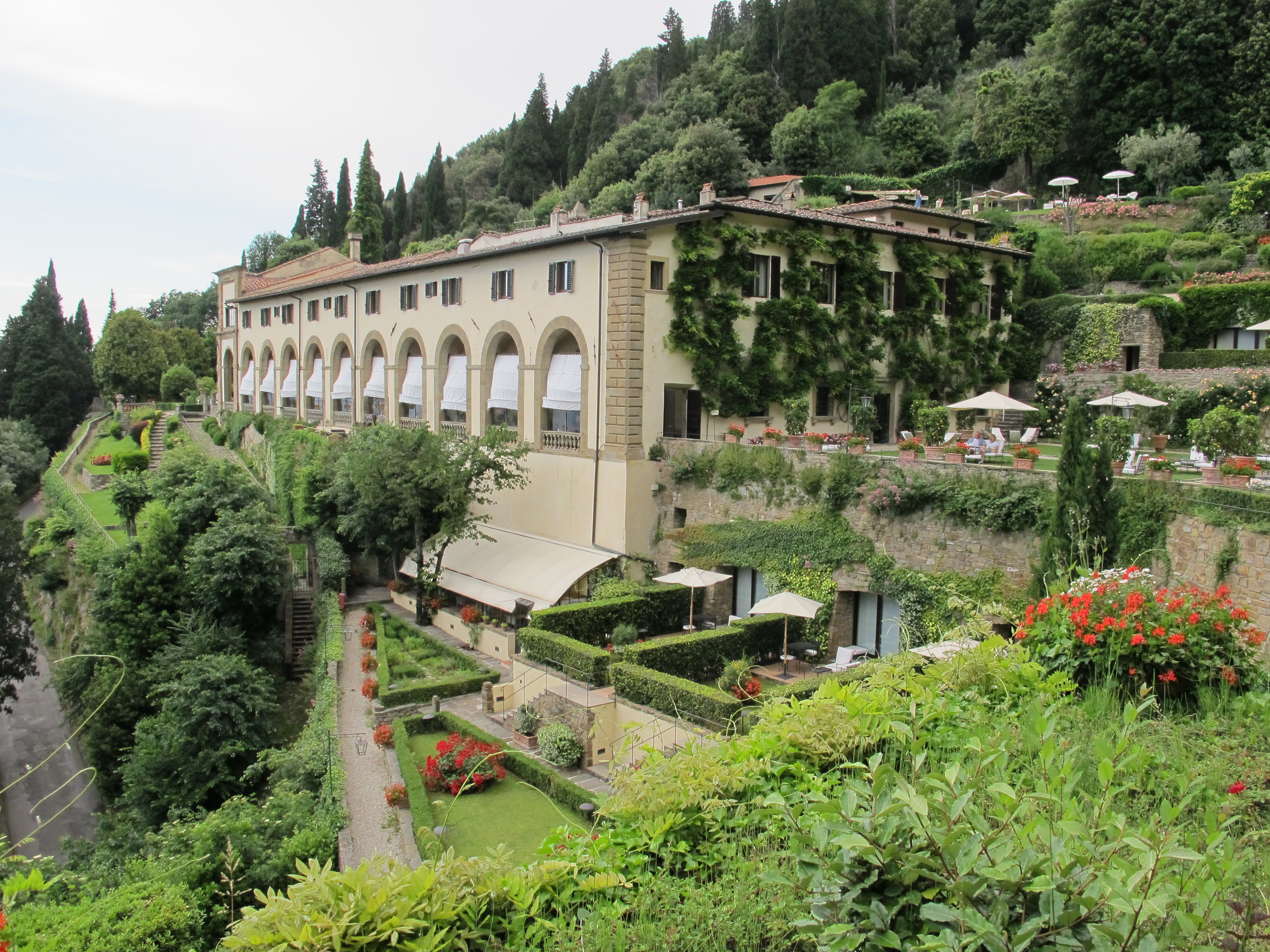
Villa San Michele

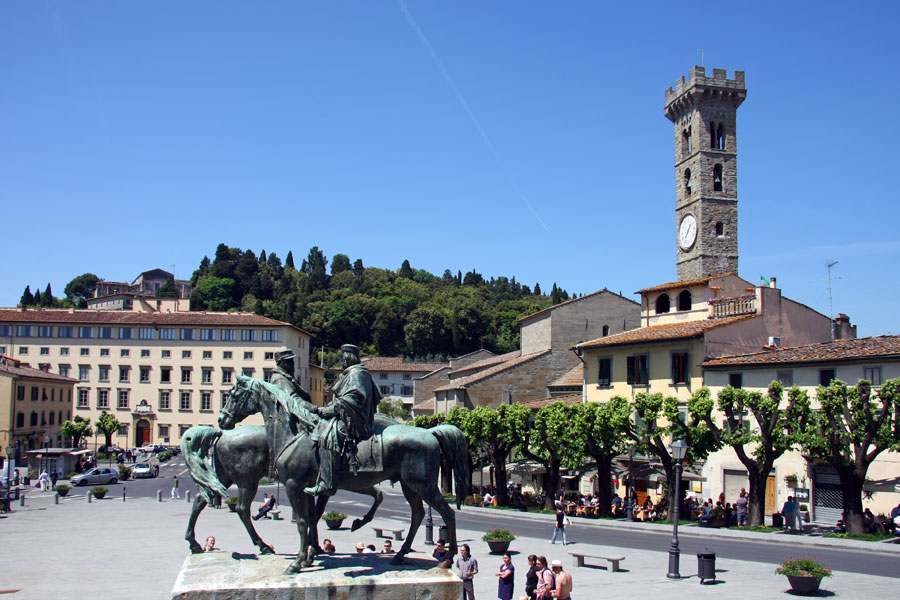
Piazza Mino

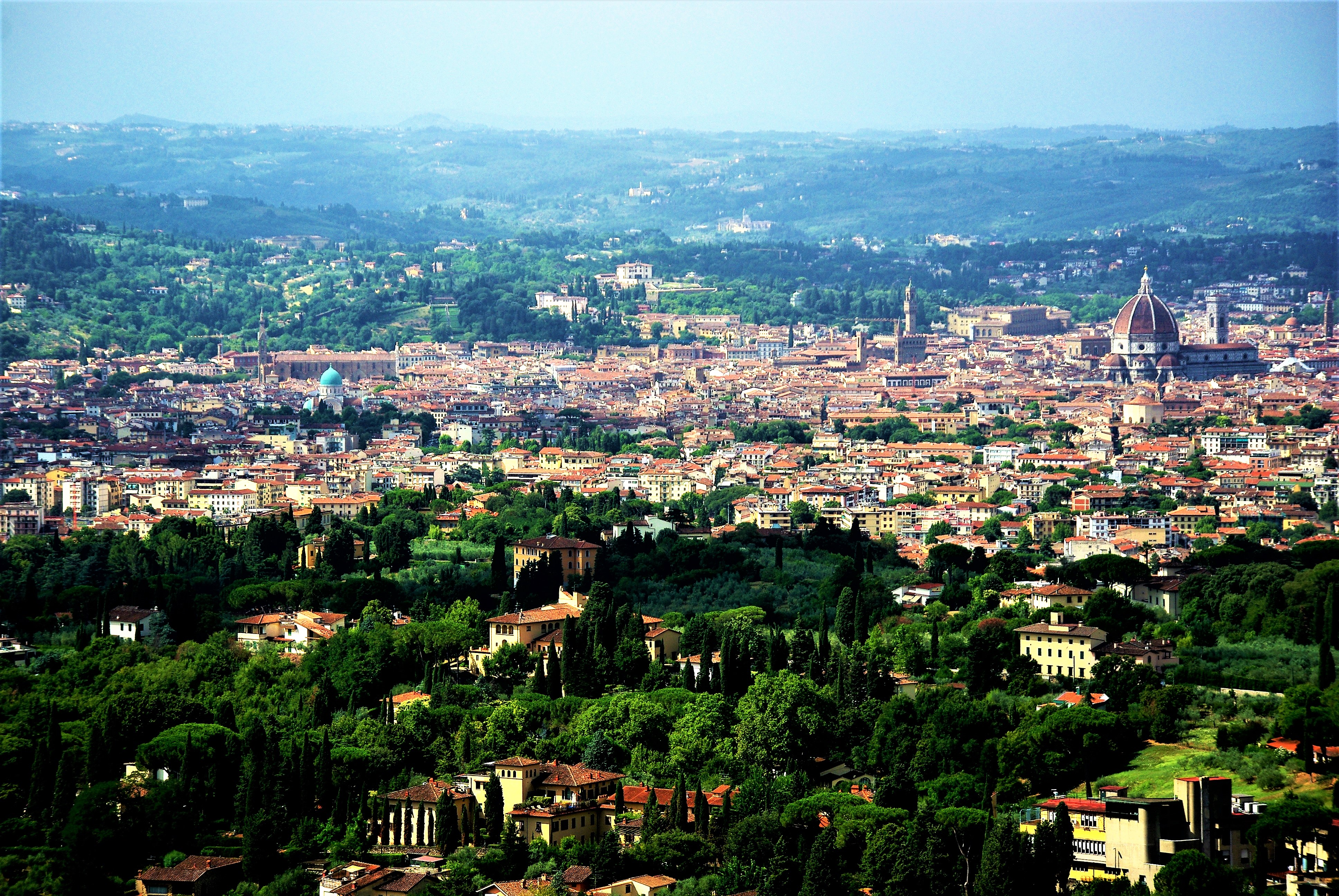
View from the hills of Fiesole overlooking Florence

- Villa I Tatti, a campus of Harvard University
- Villa Medici
- Villa Le Balze, a campus of Georgetown University
- Villa Palmieri
- Villa Schifanoia
- Villa Sparta, former residence in exile of the Greek royal family
- Fonte Lucente, where a crucifix is greatly revered as miraculous
- Castello di Vincigliata
- Diocesan Seminary of Fiesole

In the neighborhood are:

- Monte Senario, the cradle of the Servite Order, where its seven holy founders lived in austerity
- S. Martino di Mensola, with the body of St. Andrew, an Irish saint, still incorrupt
- Monte Ceceri and the monument to Leonardo da Vinci's attempted flight

== Notable residents ==
- Angelo Maria Bandini, Italian author
- Bernard Berenson, American art historian
- Giovanni Boccaccio, Renaissance humanist
- Arnold Böcklin, Swiss painter
- St. Andrew Corsini, a Florentine Carmelite friar (1302–January 6, 1373), Bishop of Fiesole
- Alexandre Dumas, French writer
- Bridget of Fiesole, ninth-century Irish nun
- Mino da Fiesole, Florentine sculptor (c. 1429—1484) and painter
- Helen of Greece and Denmark, queen mother of Romania (was awarded the honorary title of Righteous Among the Nations in 1993 for her humanitarian efforts to save the Jews of Romania)
- Hermann Hesse, German-Swiss writer, featured the city in his well-known novel Peter Camenzind
- Paul of Greece, King of Greece
- Paul Klee, German painter
- Francesco Landini (c. 1325–1397), composer, singer, poet, organist, and instrument maker
- Paolo Litta, composer
- Elisabeth Mann-Borgese, German writer
- Lorenzo Monaco (1370–1424), painter
- Marcel Proust, French writer
- Andrew the Scot, ninth-century Irish archdeacon
- Gertrude Stein and Alice B. Toklas spent their summers in Fiesole before the First World War
- Roger Verity Anglo-Italian entomologist
- Frank Lloyd Wright, American architect
- Walter Savage Landor, English writer and poet
- Miloš Crnjanski, Serbian writer and poet who wrote his 1973 poem Stražilovo in Fiesole

== In literature ==
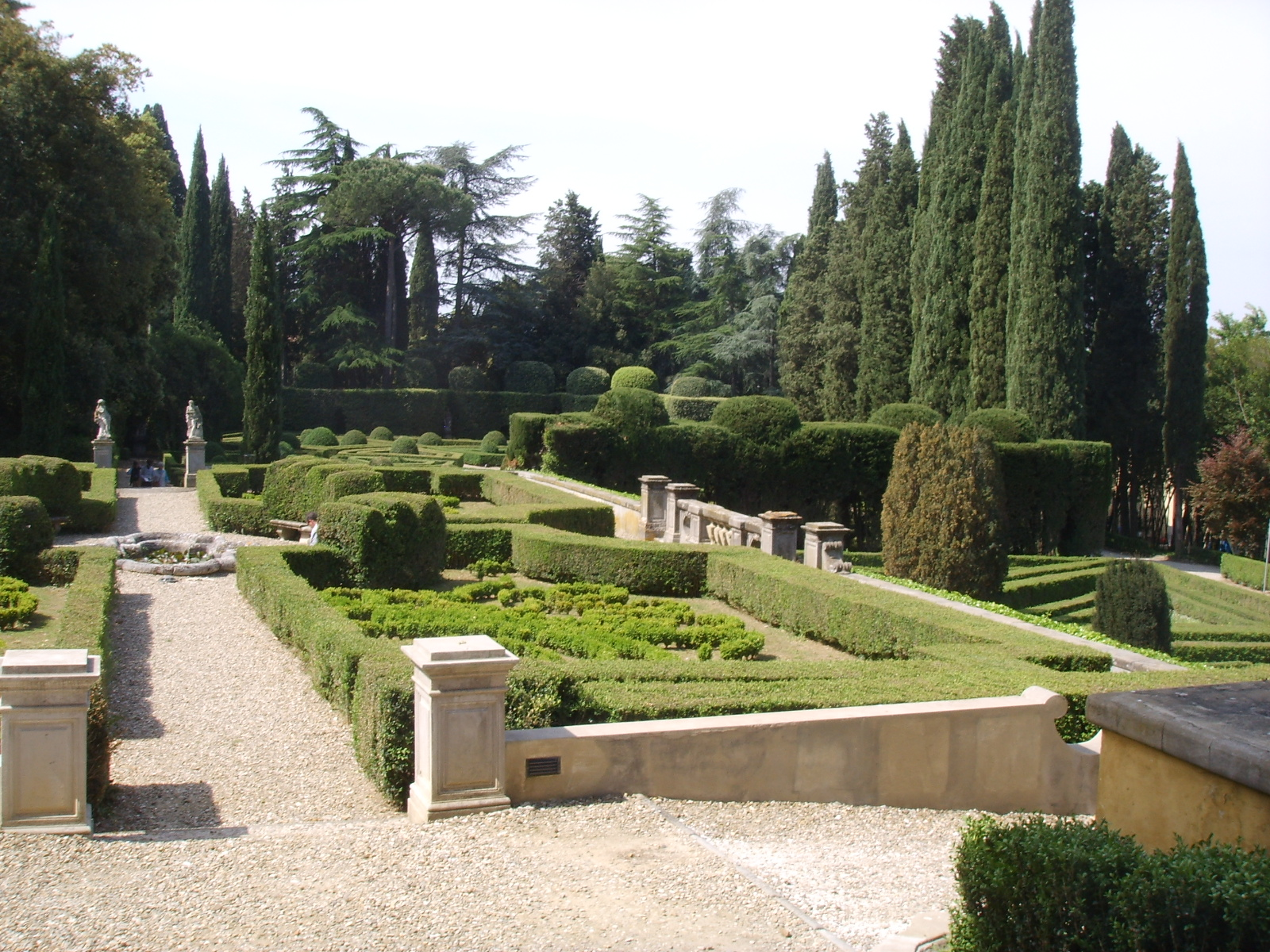
The formal garden of Villa Schifanoia, where Boccaccio's Decameron is believed to be set

The Decameron by Giovanni Boccaccio is set in the slopes of Fiesole. It is believed that the inspiration for the story's setting was the formal garden of Villa Schifanoia. The city was featured equally in the novels Peter Camenzind (1904) by Hermann Hesse, A Room with a View (1908) by E. M. Forster, and in the book of travel essays Italian Hours (1909) by Henry James. Howard Moss uses the town's name to rhyme with "crazily" in the final verse of his poem Tourists.

Also in Dante's Inferno, Canto XV, "But that ungrateful and malignant race Which down from Fiesole[465] came long ago, And still its rocky origin betrays, Will for thy worthiness become thy foe; And with good reason, for 'mong crab-trees wild It ill befits the mellow fig to grow. By widespread ancient rumour are they styled A people blind, rapacious, envious, vain: See by their manners thou be not defiled. Fortune reserves such honour for thee, fain Both sides[466] will be to enlist thee in their need; But from the beak the herb shall far remain. Let beasts of Fiesole go on to tread Themselves to litter, nor the plants molest, If any such now spring on their rank bed, In whom there flourishes indeed the blest Seed of the Romans who still lingered there When of such wickedness 'twas made the nest.'"

== In contemporary art ==
- Wall mural in Grossi Florentino, executed by students of Napier Waller under supervision

== See also ==
- Diocese of Fiesole
