= Villa Medici, Fiesole =

Patrician villa in Fiesole, Tuscany, Italy

Coordinates: 43°48′21.16″N 11°17′21.21″E

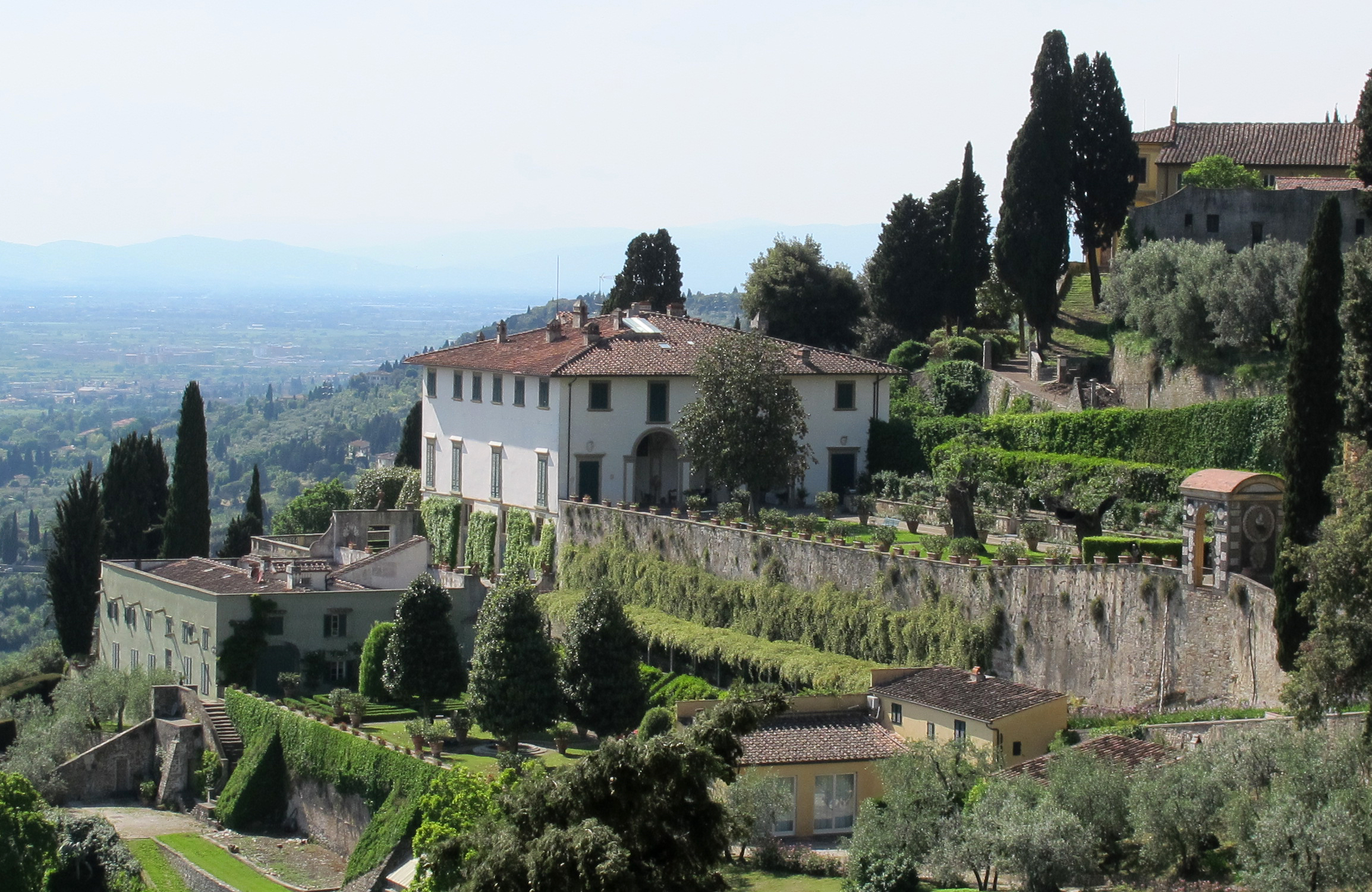
Villa Medici in Fiesole, with neighboring Villa San Girolamo (upper right)

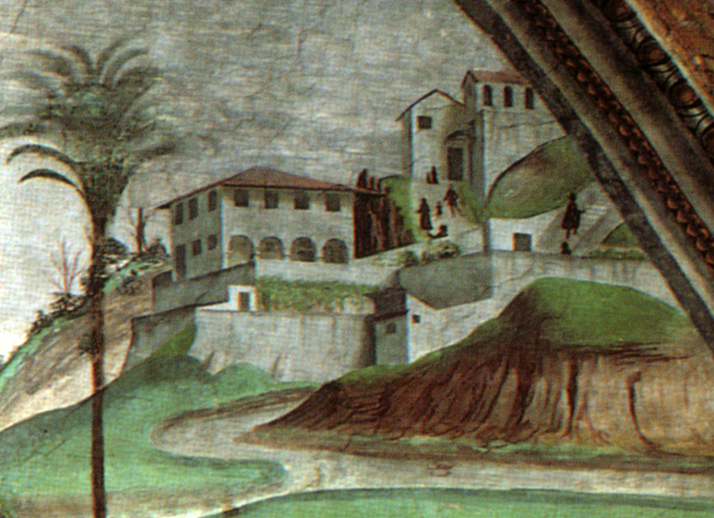
The villa in the 15th century, depicted by Domenico Ghirlandaio in the Tornabuoni Chapel of Santa Maria Novella

The Villa Medici is a patrician villa in Fiesole, Tuscany, Italy, the fourth oldest of the villas built for the Medici family. It was built between 1451 and 1457. It is part of the UNESCO World Heritage Site inscribed as Medici Villas and Gardens in Tuscany.

== In popular culture ==
Villa Medici in Fiesole is mentioned in Michael Ondaatje's 1992 novel The English Patient, where the titular character identifies a ruined convent as either Villa Bruscoli or Villa Medici in Fiesole.

== See also ==
- Villa San Girolamo, just above the Villa Medici
- Medici villas
- Italian Renaissance garden
