= San Francesco Convent (Fiesole) =

Convent of Saint Francis
- Convento di San Francesco (Italian)
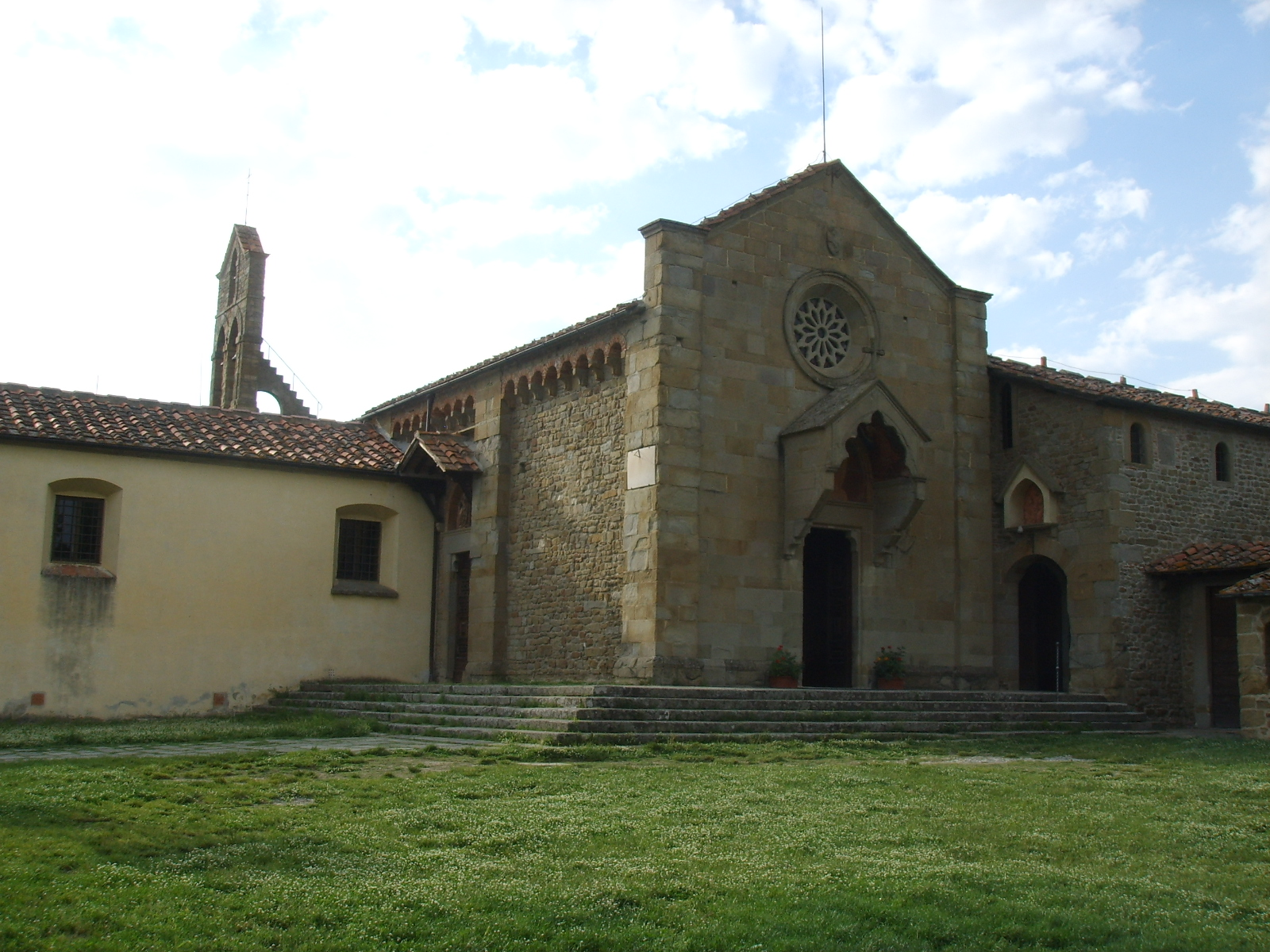
- Exterior and entrance to the convent
- Convent of Saint Francis
- 43°48′28.9″N 11°17′23.9″E
- Location: Fiesole, Tuscany
- Country: Italy
- Denomination: Roman Catholic
- Tradition: Roman Rite
- Religious institute: Order of Friars Minor

History
- Status: Convent
- Dedication: Saint Francis of Assisi

Architecture
- Style: Gothic, Renaissance
- Groundbreaking: 1399
- Completed: 1906

Administration
- Diocese: Diocese of Fiesole

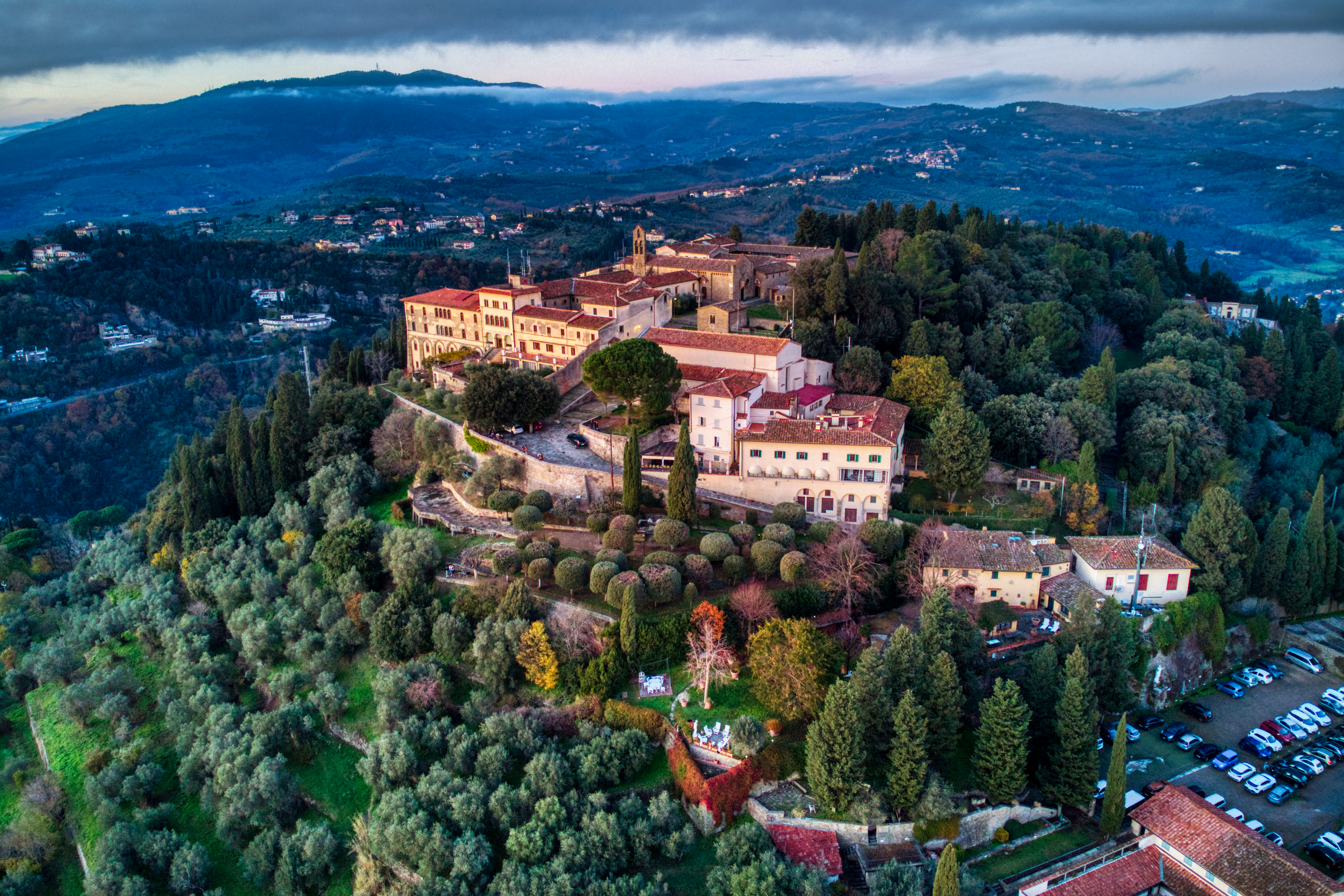
San Francesco Convent near the top of the highest point in Fiesole

The Convent of Saint Francis (Italian: Convento di San Francesco) is a Franciscan convent located in the western, historic center of Fiesole in the region of Tuscany, Italy.

Located on Via San Francesco, it is adjacent to the former Basilica of Sant'Alessandro and near the Cathedral of Saint Romulus.

== History ==
A small hermitage was built in 1399 on the site of the current convent by the Franciscans. At the end of the fifteenth century, the underground chapel was enlarged with an above-ground apse and choir. Between 1905 and 1906, the church underwent restoration by architect Giuseppe Castellucci, returning the church to a style similar to its original one.

In 1993, the future president of the Philippines, Ferdinand Bongbong Marcos, and future first lady, Liza Araneta Marcos, married at the convent.

== Facilities ==
The present complex consists in a church and convent.

=== Church ===
==== Exterior ====
The facade of the church is Gothic in style with a gabled roof. It is constructed of stone blocks and masonry. At the center is a doorway with a porch, the inside of which contains a portrait of St. Francis. Above the door is a rose window.

==== Interior ====
The interior of the church is in a simple Gothic style with a single nave covered by an arched barrel vault ceiling. The nave is divided into four bays. Among each the vaults are four side altars.

In the rear wall of the apse is a pipe organ built in 1938 by Mascioni. The organ has a fully electric drive. Its console has three keyboards with 61 notes each and a concave-radial pedalboard with 32 notes.

=== Convent ===
The convent is located to the right of the church. Its main entrance faces the square and consists of a frescoed arch. The convent building is surrounded by three cloisters. The largest cloister comprises a four-sided portico covered by a cross vault ceiling.

== Gallery ==
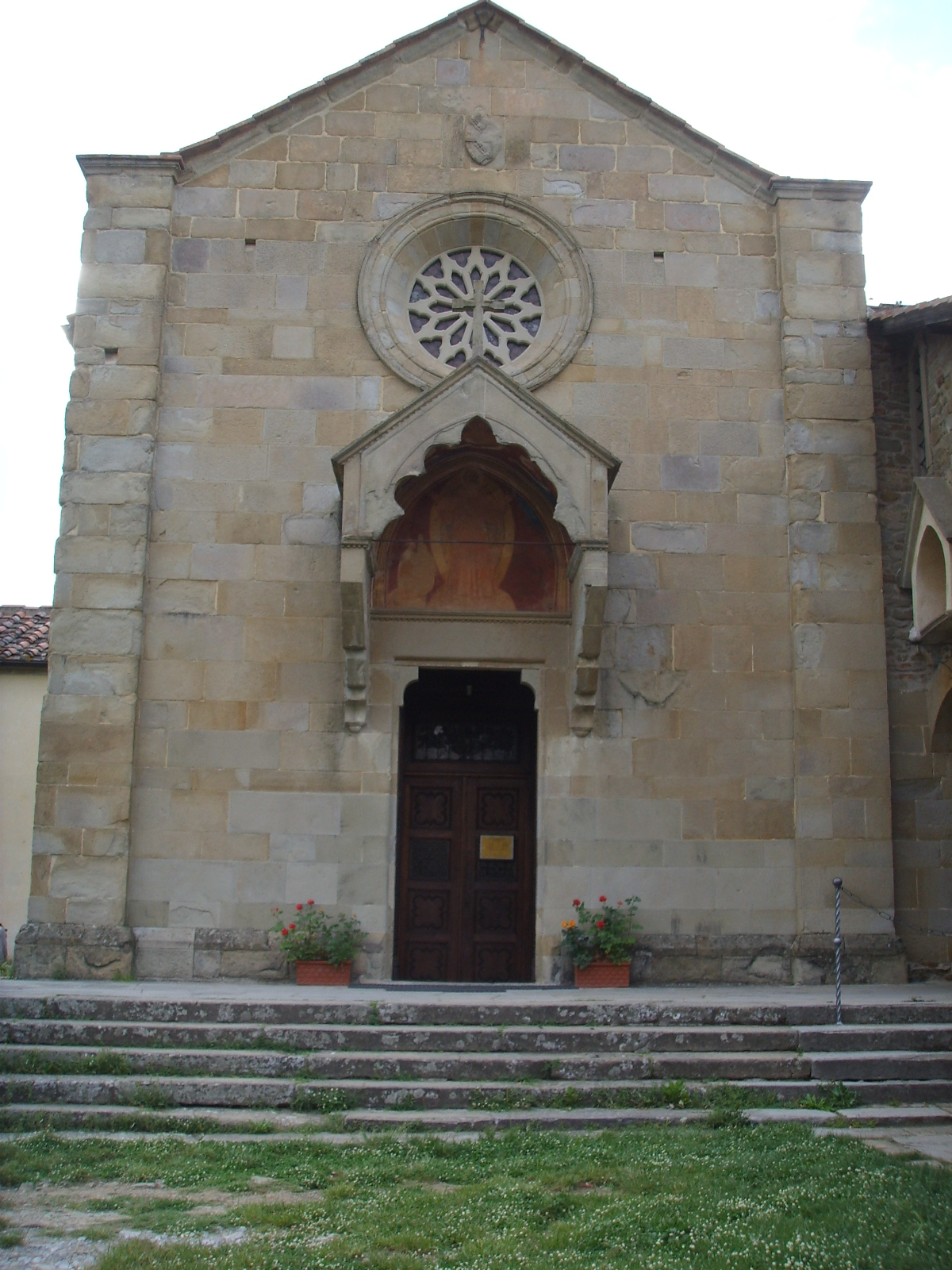

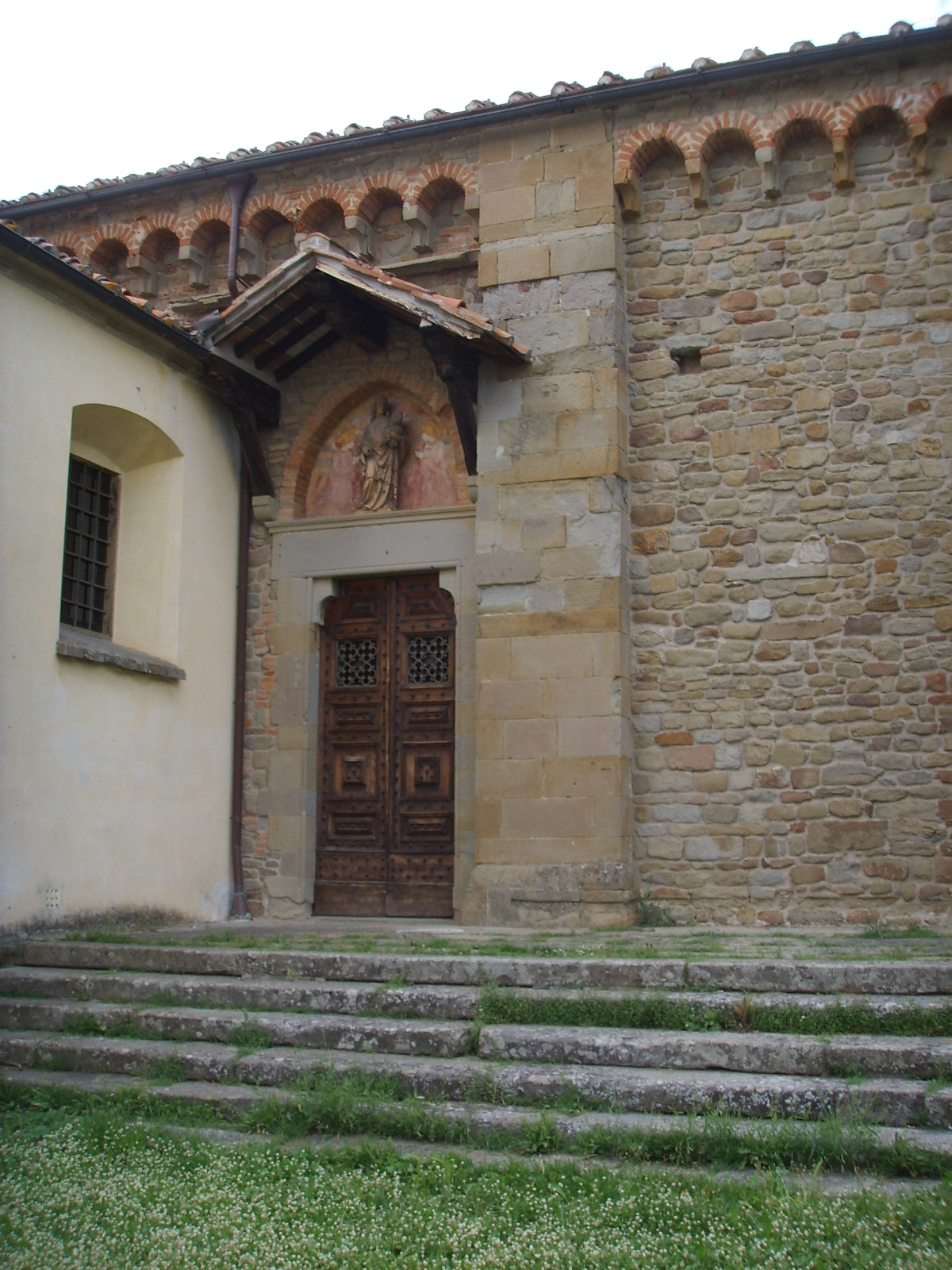

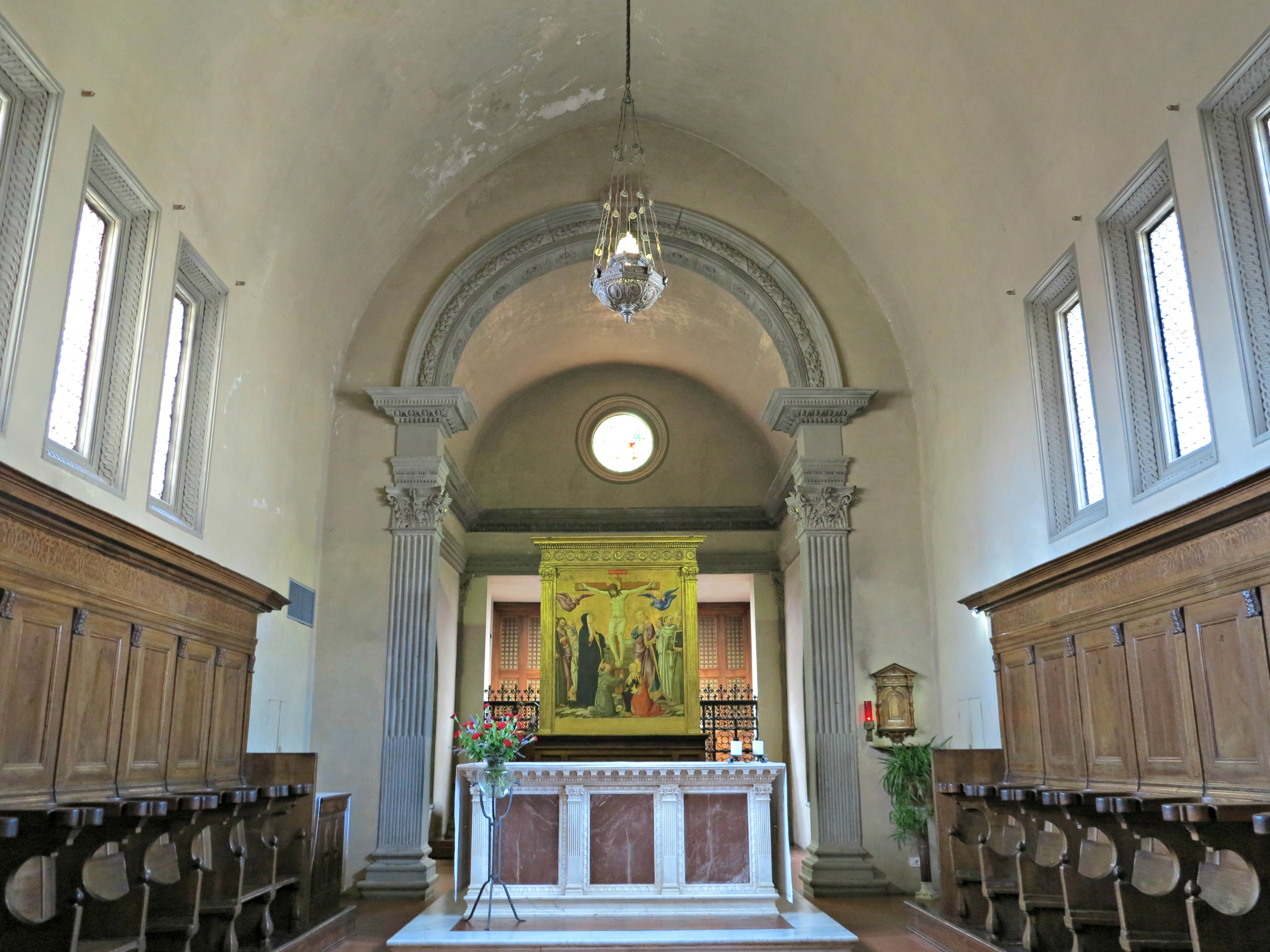

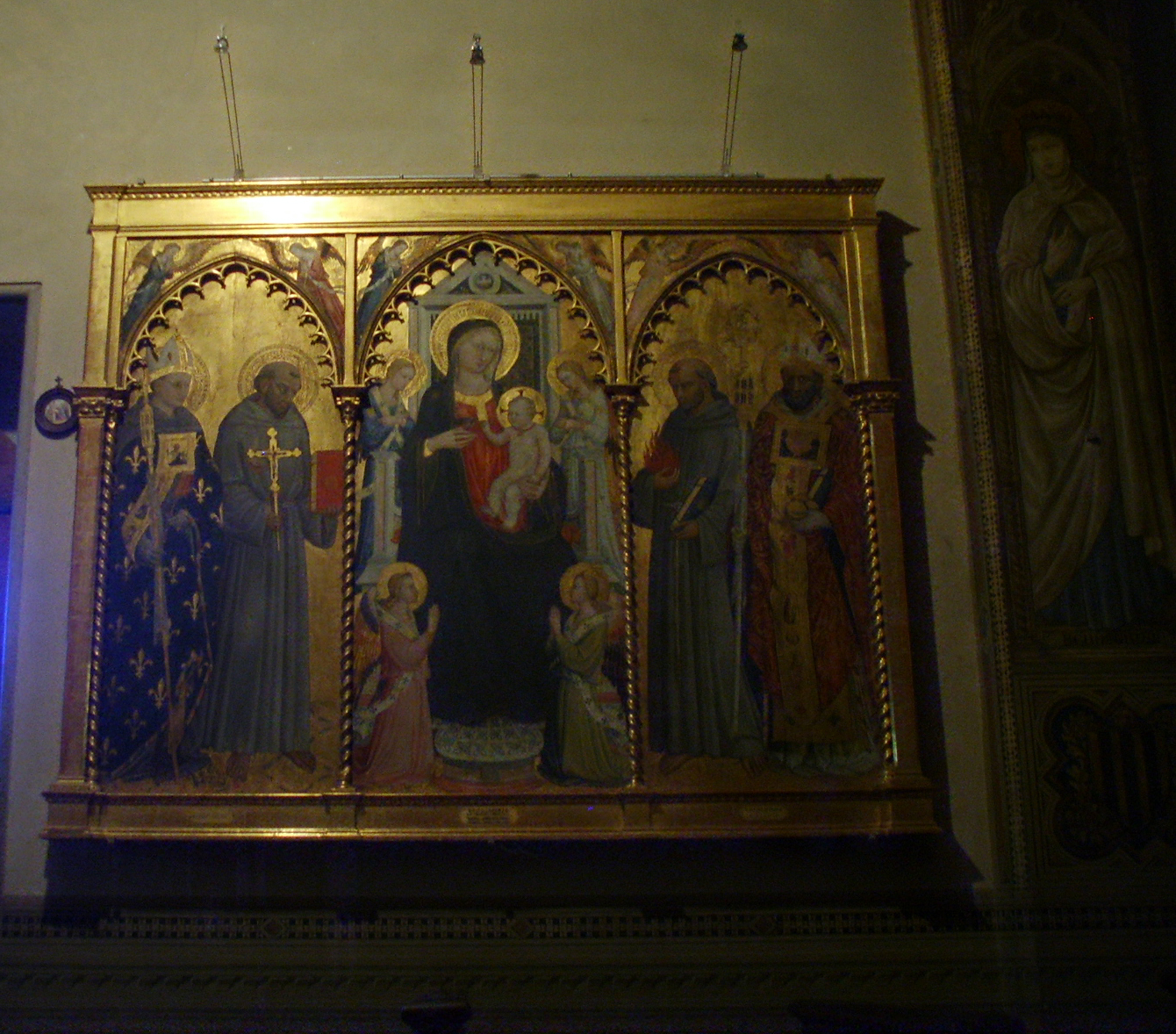

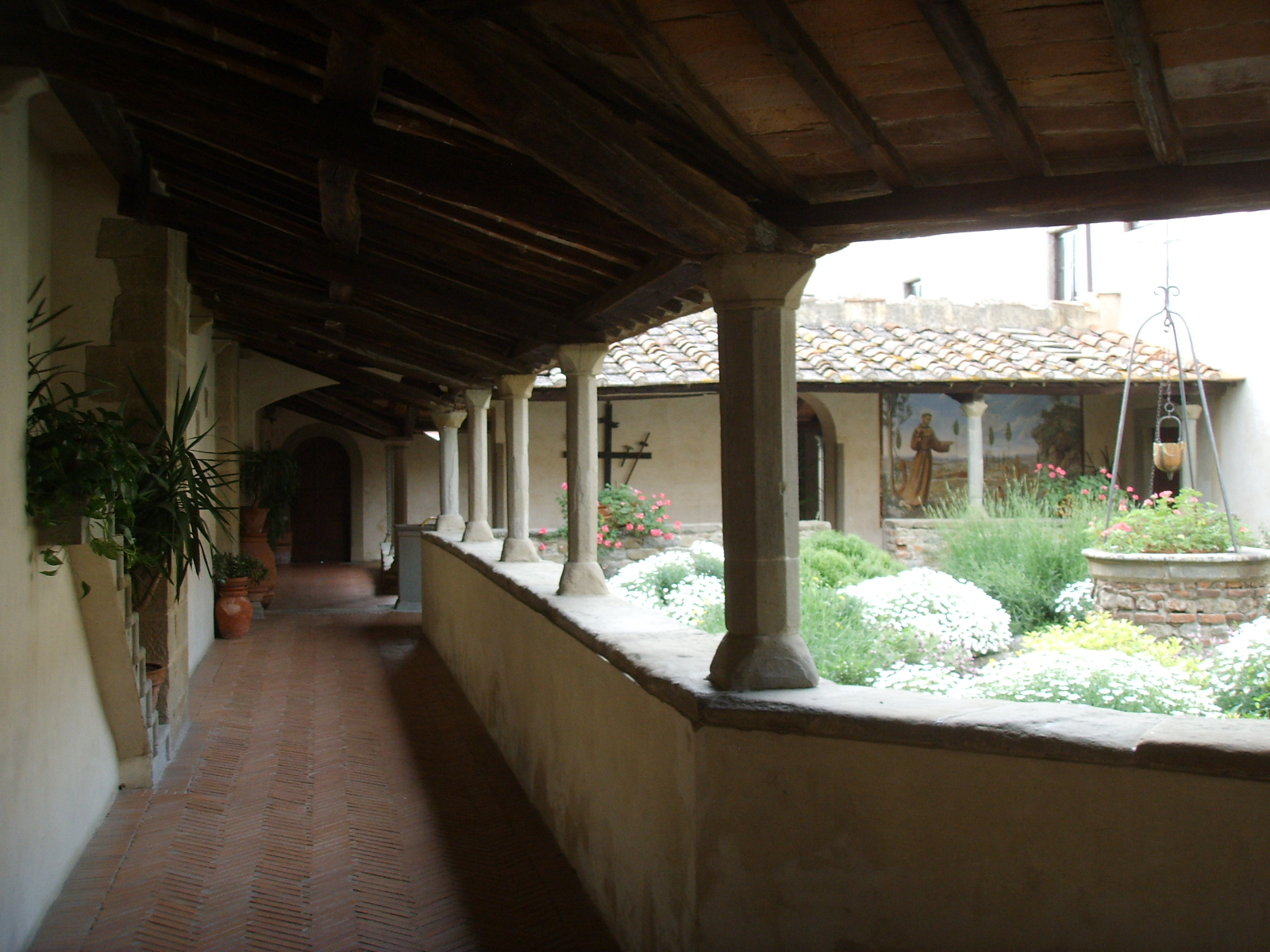

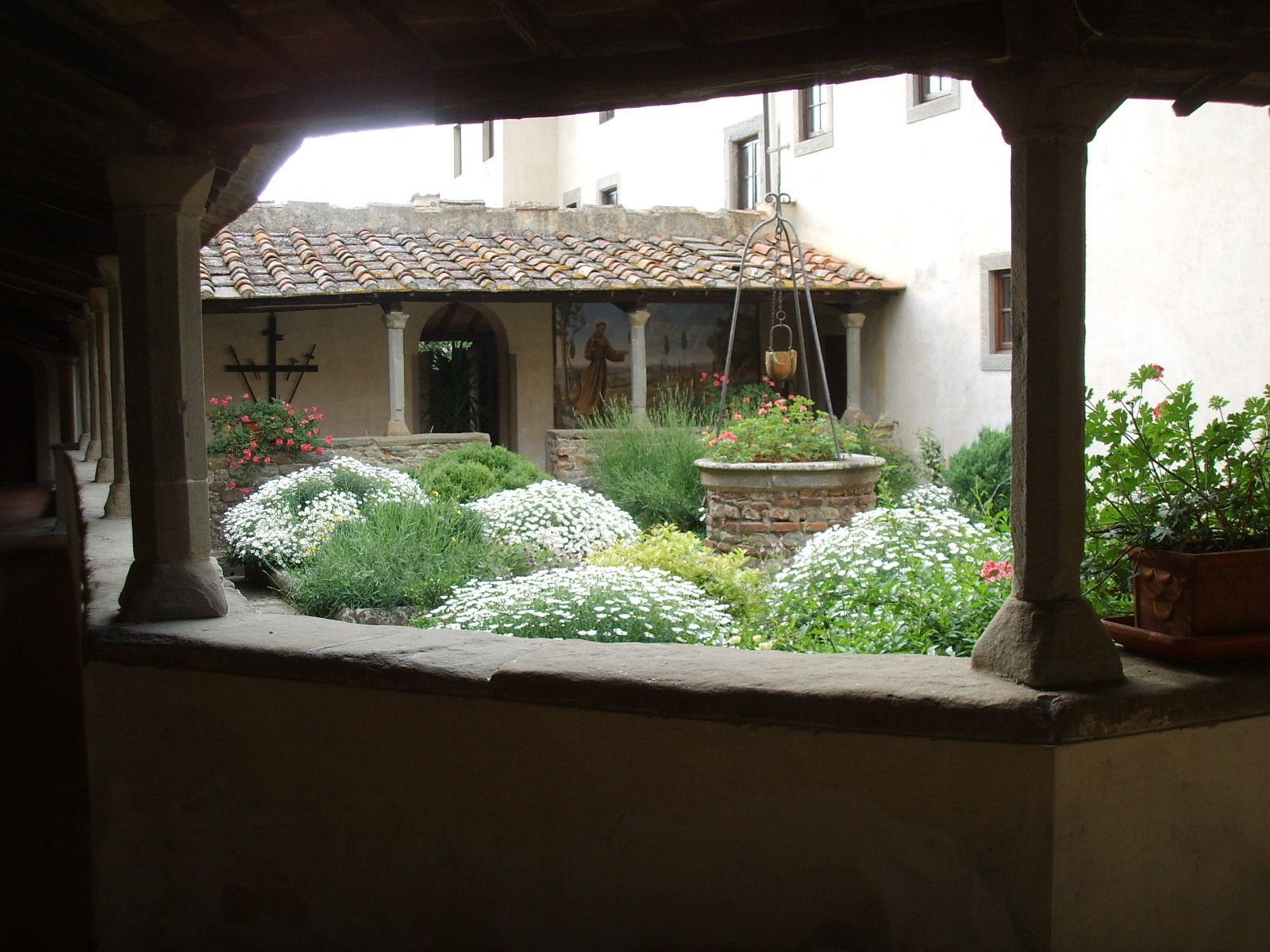

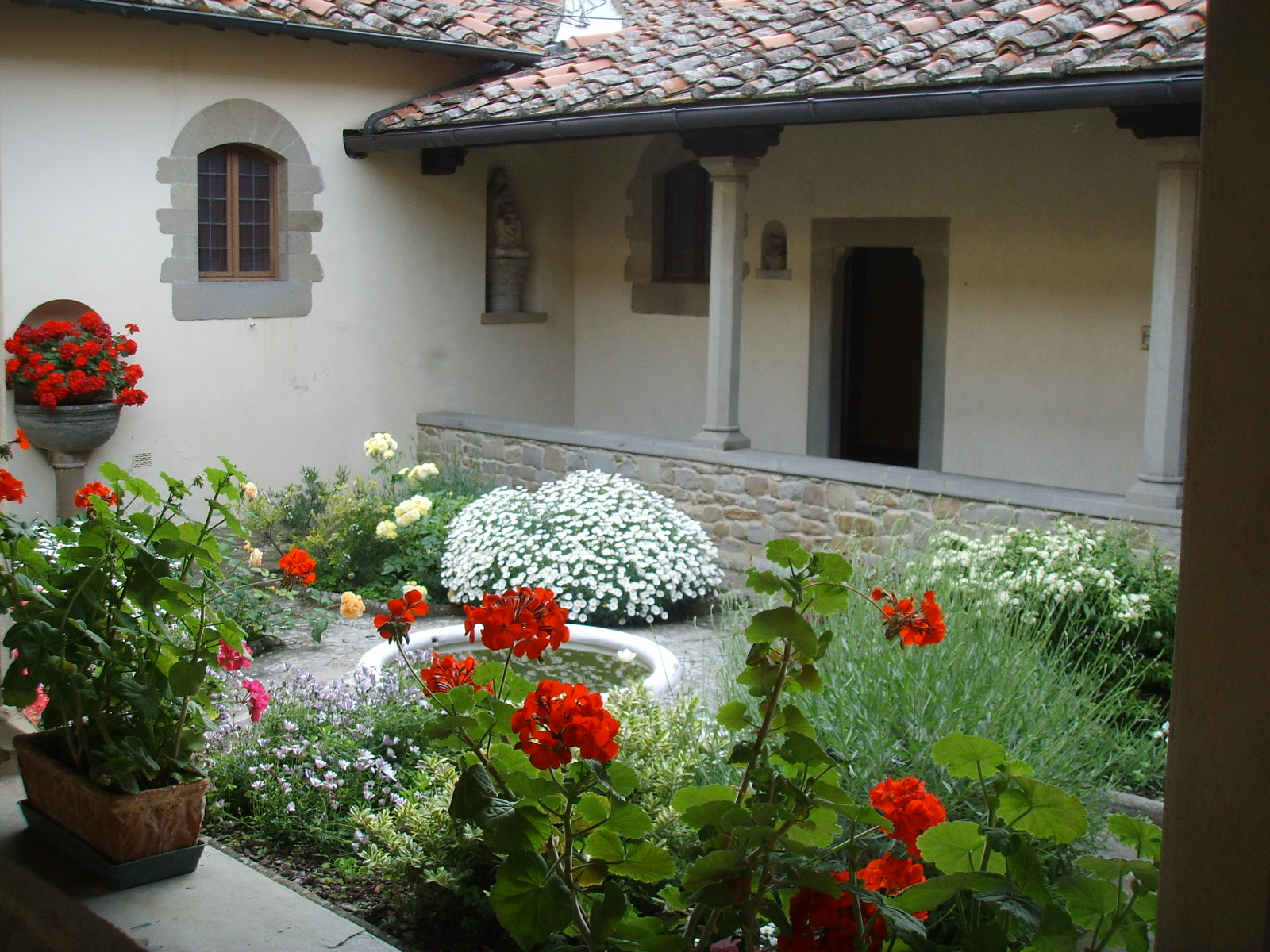

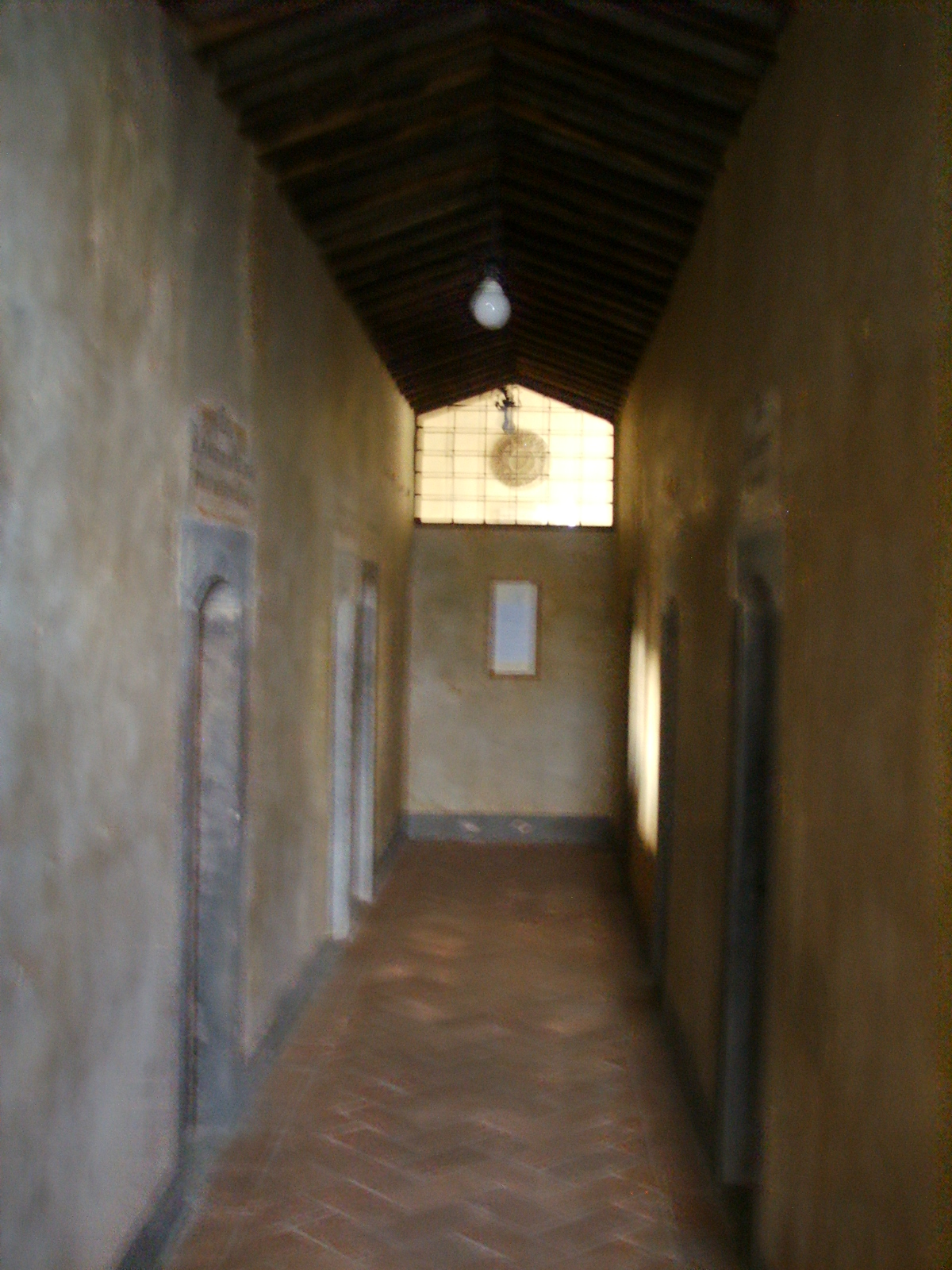

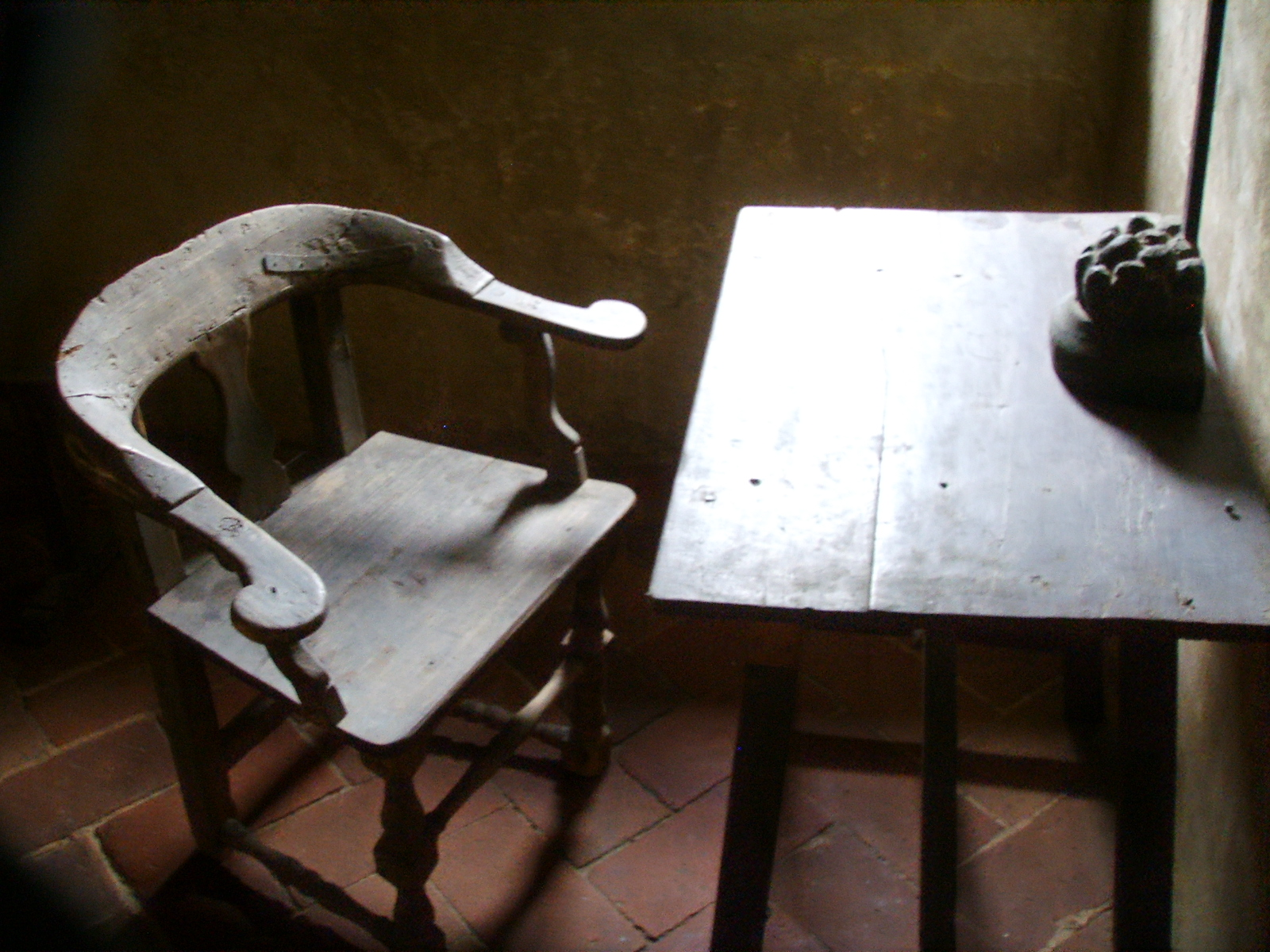

== See also ==
- Fiesole Cathedral
- Church of San Girolamo
- Diocese of Fiesole
- Diocesan Seminary of Fiesole
