= Fiesole Cathedral =

- Cathedral of Saint Romulus of Fiesole
- Duomo di Fiesole (Italian)
- Cattedrale di San Romolo di Fiesole (Italian)
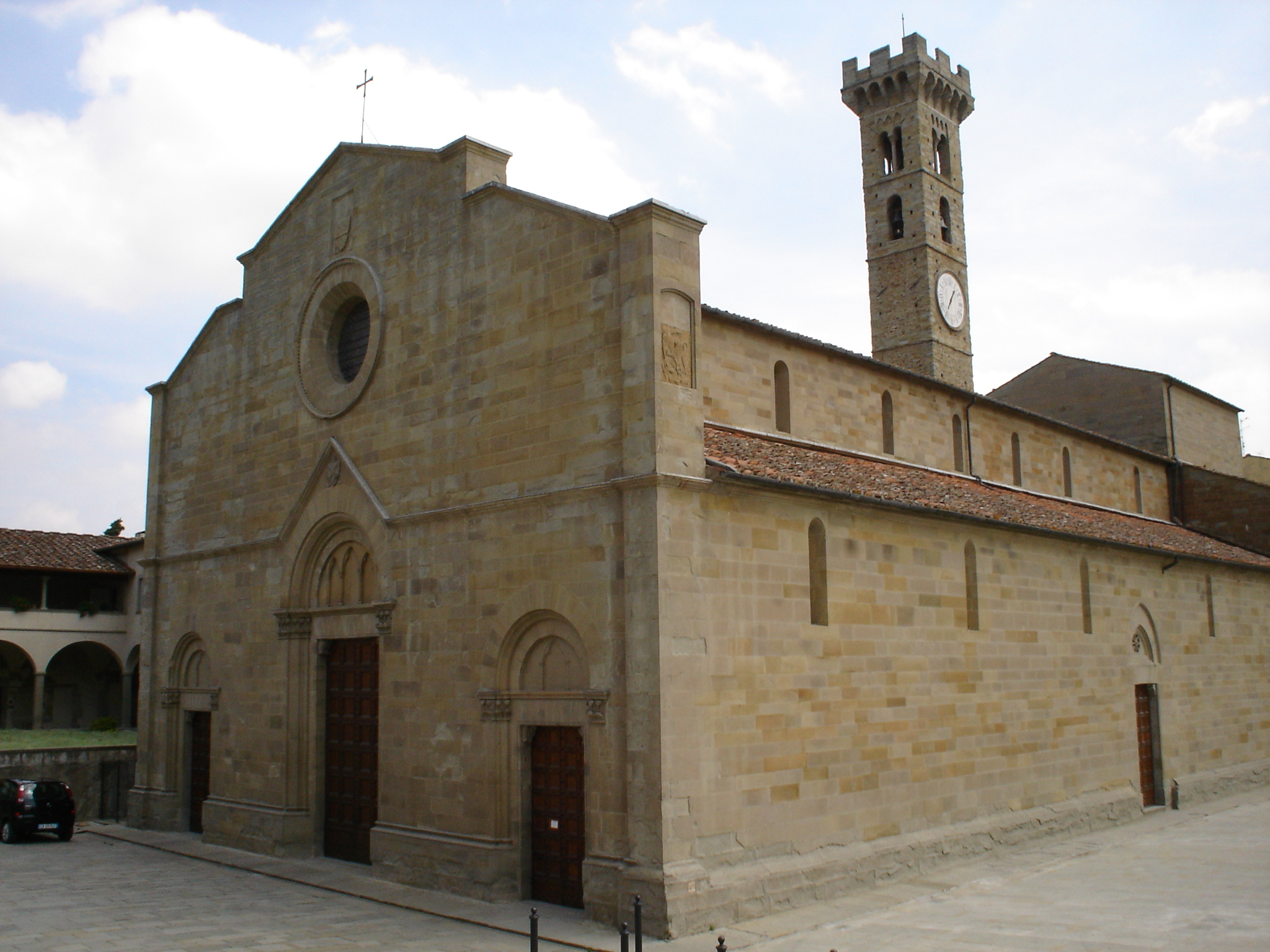
- Fiesole Cathedral facade
- Fiesole Cathedral
- 43°48′26″N 11°17′33″E
- Location: Fiesole, Tuscany
- Country: Italy
- Denomination: Catholic Church
- Website: Fiesole Cathedral

History
- Status: Cathedral
- Dedication: Saint Romulus of Fiesole
- Consecrated: 1028

Architecture
- Architectural type: Church
- Style: Romanesque architecture
- Completed: 1028

Specifications
- Length: 55 metres (180 ft)
- Width: 27 metres (89 ft)

Administration
- Diocese: Diocese of Fiesole

Clergy
- Bishop: Mario Meini

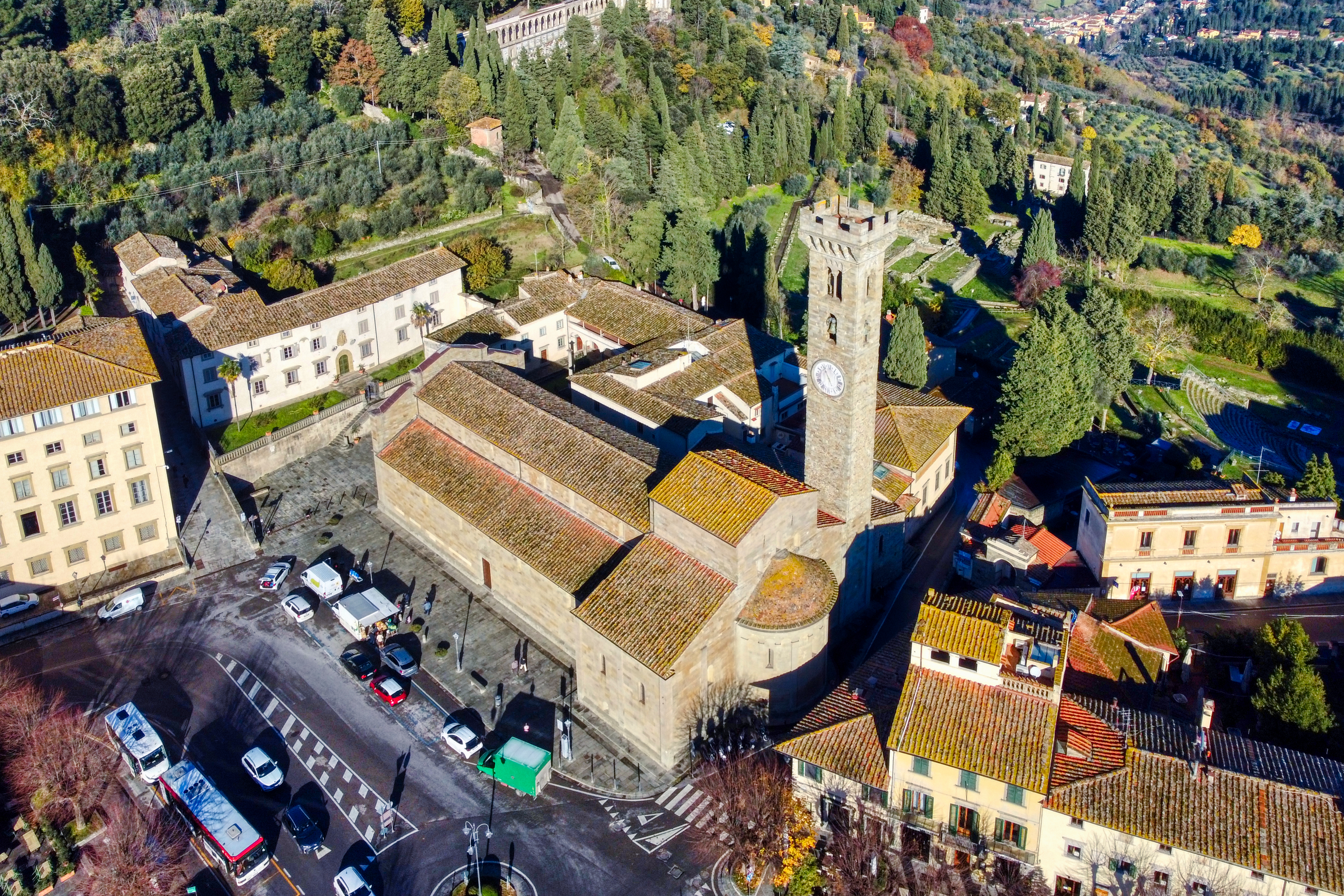
The cathedral from above

Fiesole Cathedral (Italian: Cattedrale di San Romolo, Duomo di Fiesole), officially the Cathedral of Saint Romulus of Fiesole, is a Roman Catholic cathedral in Fiesole, Tuscany, central Italy. It is the seat of the Bishop of Fiesole and is dedicated to Saint Romulus.

== History ==
The first cathedral of Fiesole was situated lower down the hill than the present one, and had been built, according to the tradition, over the site of the martyrdom of Saint Romulus of Fiesole. In 1028 the present cathedral was founded by Bishop Jacopo the Bavarian to replace it, as he wished it to be inside the city walls. The old cathedral was converted into a Benedictine abbey and became known as the "Badia di Fiesole". It was rebuilt in 1466 by a disciple of Filippo Brunelleschi. Its façade, dating from the 11th century, is still preserved. It contains notable early works by Mino da Fiesole. The abbey was closed in 1778.

== Description ==
The exterior is Romanesque. The cathedral is built on the basilica floorplan with a nave and two aisles separated by stone columns which have capitals decorated with figures and animals. It has a raised presbytery over the crypt and a trussed ceiling. The picturesque battlemented campanile was built in 1213. The church was restored in 1256.

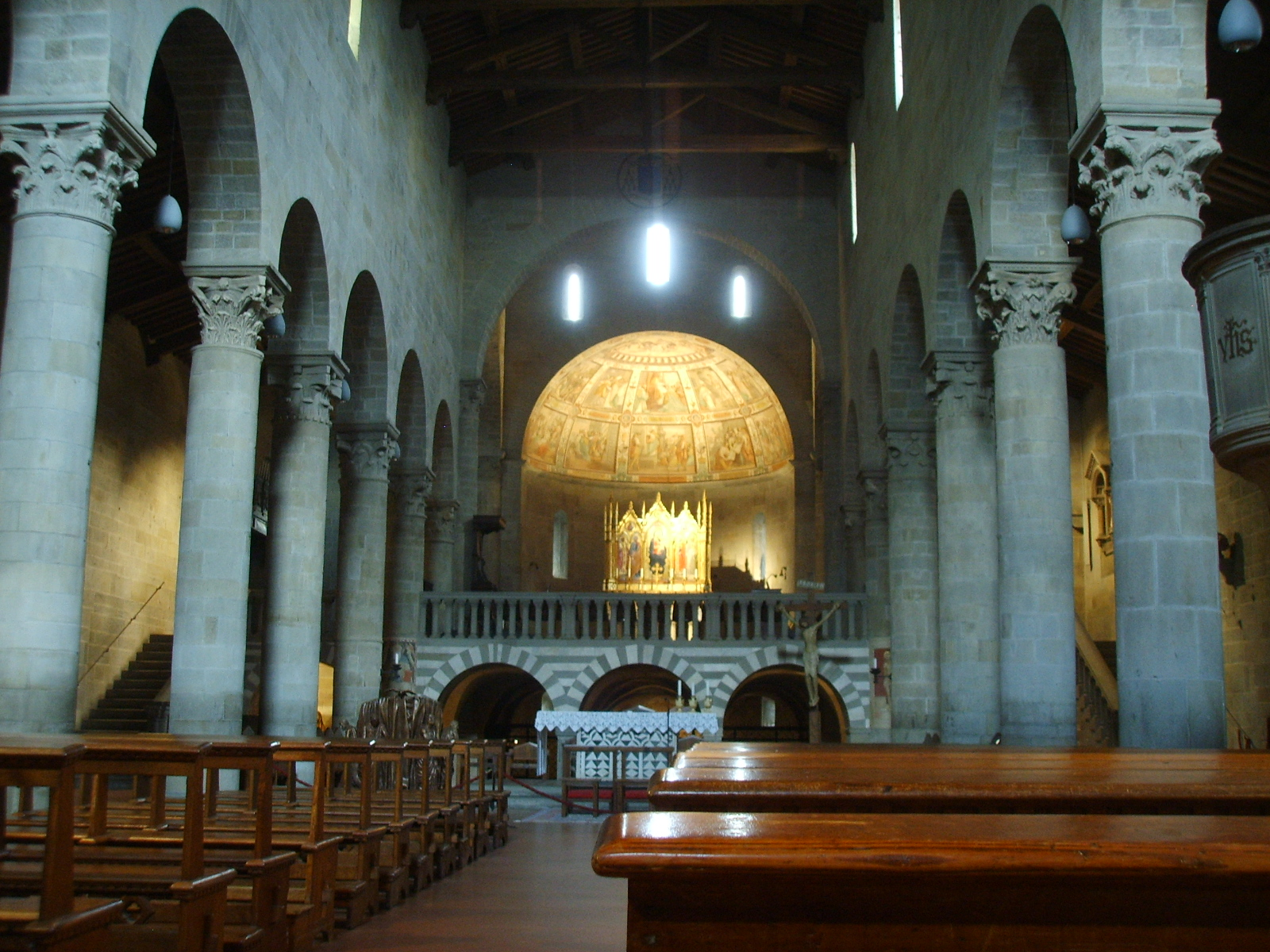
The plain and majestic interior

The interior has little decoration, apart from the marble altar (1273) and two frescoes, depicting Saint Benedict (c. 1420) and Saint Sebastian by Pietro Perugino (late 15th century). In the presbytery is a polyptych of the Three stories of Saint Nicholas, by Bicci di Lorenzo, commissioned in 1450. In the Salutati Chapel is the funerary monument of bishop Leonardo Salutati, executed by Mino da Fiesole. In the Canon's Chapel is a marble altar by Andrea Ferrucci (1492–1494).

In the counter-façade is a huge statue of Saint Romulus by Giovanni della Robbia (1521). The crypt's small columns have 11th century capitals, perhaps taken from the original construction. The decoration includes late Gothic medallions on the vault, while on the left wall is a cycle of the Stories of St. Romulus by the school of Domenico Ghirlandaio. The bishops' funerary chapel has a 13th-century icon attributed to one "Master of Bigallo", portraying the Madonna and Child (1215–1220).

== See also ==
- Diocesan Seminary of Fiesole
- San Francesco Monastery (Fiesole)
- Church of Santa Maria Primerana
- Episcopal Palace, Fiesole
