= Funerary Monument to Cardinal Niccolo Forteguerri, Pistoia =

Assembly of sculptures in Tuscany, Italy

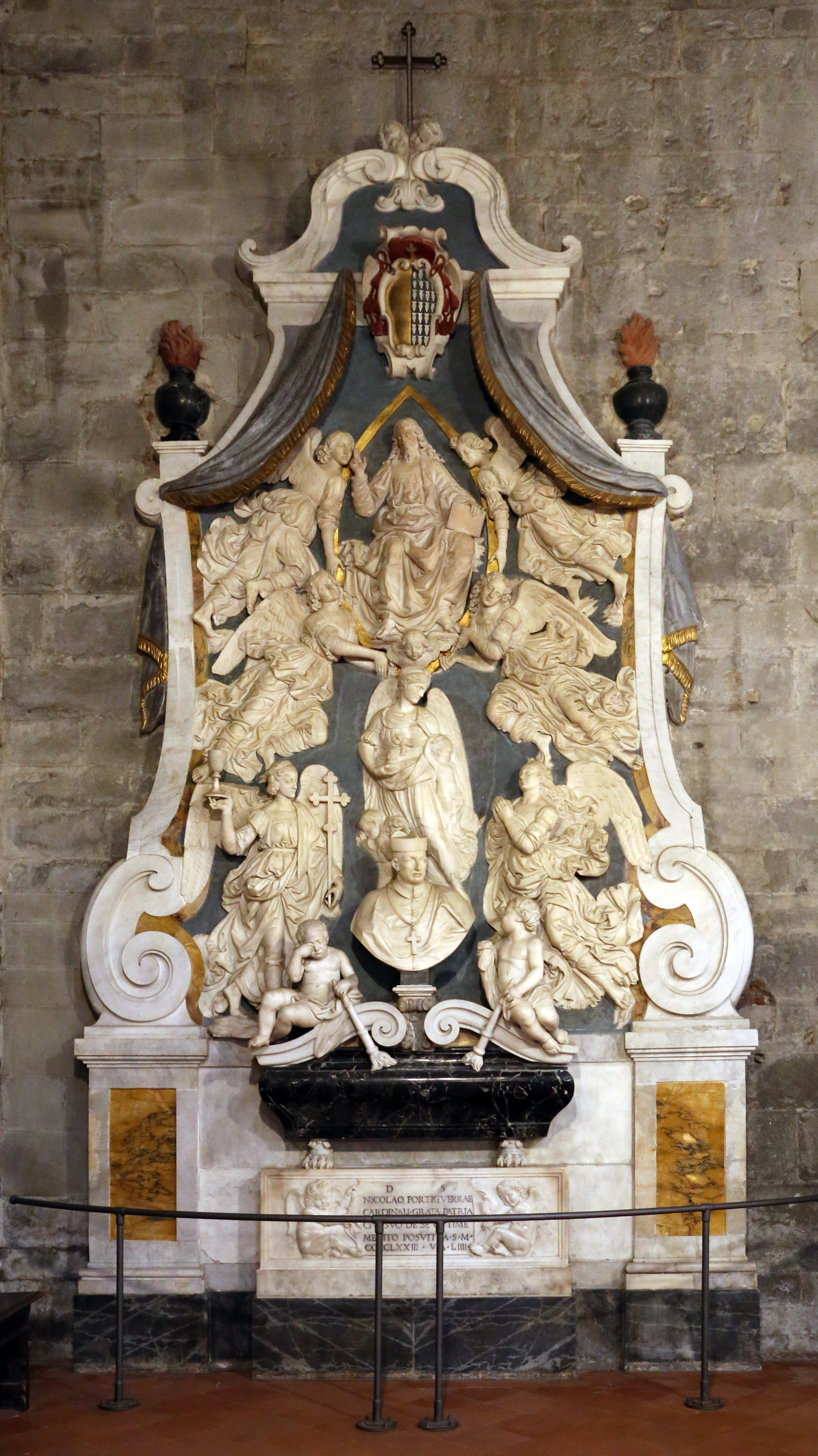
Monument to Forteguerri in Duomo of Pistoia

The Funerary Monument to Cardinal Niccolo Forteguerri (circa 1483) is an assembly of mostly deep bas-relief sculptures installed posthumously on a wall of the Cathedral of Pistoia to memorialize the native Cardinal. While the initial design for this monument was completed by the Renaissance sculptor Andrea Verrochio, the present arrangement, completed centuries later, was assembled with substantial modifications by lesser-known artists.

== History ==
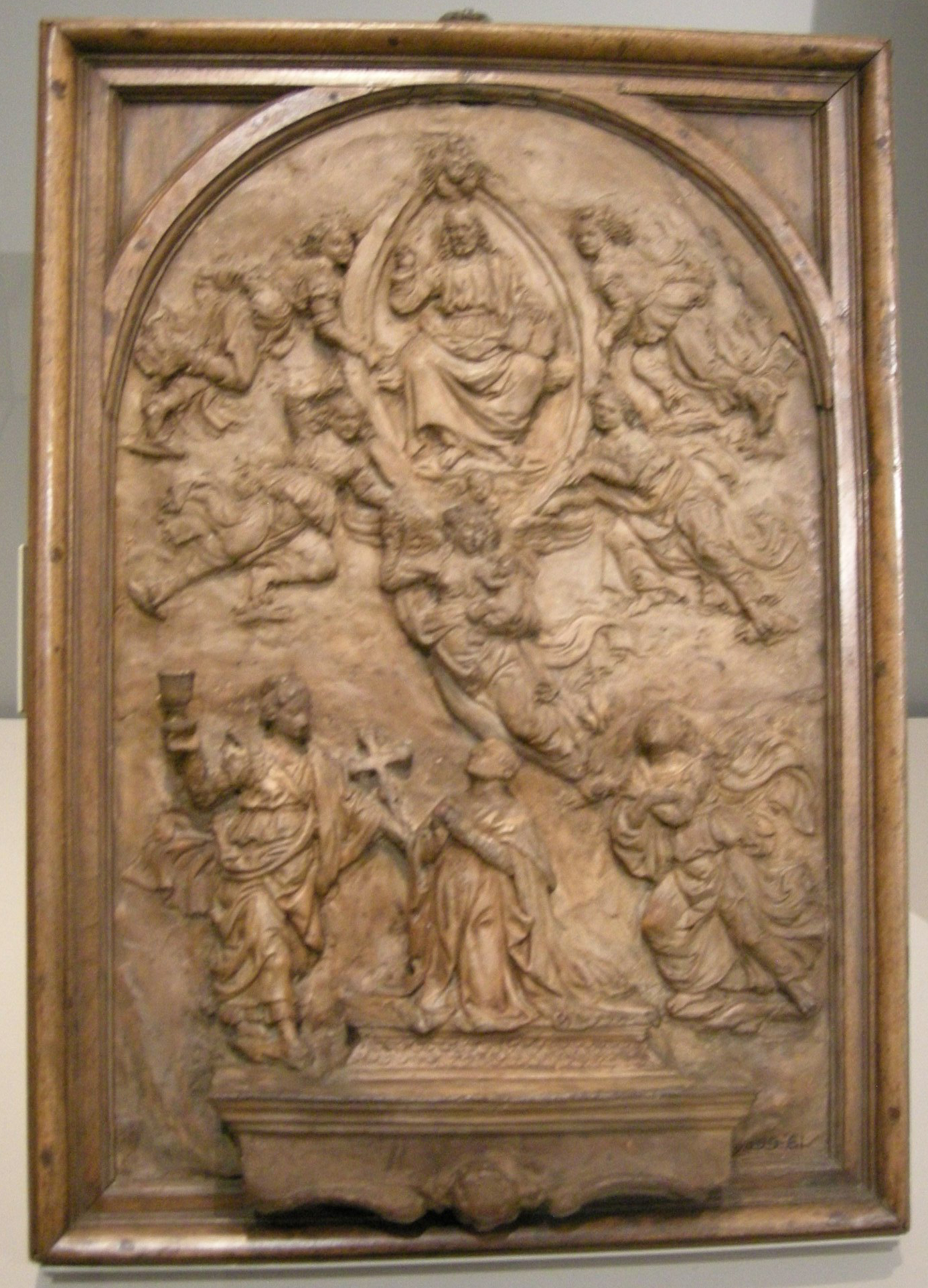
Bozetto of Monument by Verrochio at Victoria and Albert Museum

Niccolò Forteguerri (1419 – 1473), nephew of Pope Pius II, was a legate, general and cardinal of the Roman Catholic church. Upon his death, his remains were interred with another monument in the church of Santa Cecilia in Trastevere in Rome; but his posthumous patronage and endowments, which included the Biblioteca Forteguerriana and an allied school in Pistoia, prompted his town to honor his memory with a local monument.

The negotiations leading to Verrochio's contract were complex. The Operai di San Jacopo or Works Commission of the Cathedral of San Jacopo in Pistoia, issued in 1473 a call for proposals for a monument from 5 sculptors, mostly based in Florence. Other than Verrochio, we do not know who the competitors for the project were, nor what their proposals depicted. It appears the proposal by Verrocchio was the initial first choice of the Operai; however, they balked at the exorbitant cost (350 ducats), since the local council had budgeted only 1100 lire. The relations of Verrochio and the Operai soon soured, and by 1477, the Operai elected to award the commission to another sculptor, Piero del Pollaiuolo, who was then active in Pistoia, and who had quoted a cost of 380 florins. However, the Pistoiese council, established by the Florentine administration, still favored Verrochio, and this disagreement led in 1478 to arbitration by Lorenzo de' Medici. From the archives of Pistoia, it is known the arbitration led to the reassignment of the commission to Verrocchio, but we do not have details of how such a decision was made.

While some documents state that the sculptures in Verrochio's studio were nearly complete by November 1483; once Verrochio had left, more disagreements emerged about payment for transport to Pistoia, and about the quality of the work. By 1483, Verrocchio had departed from Florence to work in Venice on the prestigious commission of the bronze equestrian statue of the condottiere Colleoni. Thus back in Florence, some of the figures appear to have been completed by assistants, led by Lorenzo di Credi.

Upon arrival to Pistoia in 1488, the Operai employed Lorenzetto Lotti and Giovanni Francesco Rustici to repair or alter the sculptures of Charity and the kneeling cardinal. This latter sculpture, in particular, was to have been of poor quality. Thus the tomb, as planned, remained incomplete for over two centuries, with the sculptures in the chapel embedded in a stucco background. Some have opinionated that the allegories of Faith, Hope, Charity and the figure of Christ were sculpted by Verrochio, while most of the angels were not.

In the 1660s, Cardinal Rospigliosi endowed the Cathedral a relic of St Bartholemew. It was initially placed in monument before Forteguerri cenotaph, but over the next century it was decided to dedicate that chapel entirely to the Saint, and displace the Forteguerri monument to first bay of left aisle. To complete the move, a poorly known Florentine sculptor, Gaetano Masoni, was hired in 1753-1754 to move the monument. He added a late baroque marble volute frames and two crying putti. Masoni in the process trimmed some of the other sculptures. The sculptures also have been compressed into a smaller space than originally planned. The poorly carved statue of the kneeling cardinal was substituted by a bust of the cardinal, all encased around volutes with a small dark marble sarcophagus.

This is not the only Forteguerri monument to suffer exile from its original positioning, the 19th-century monument of the cardinal in Piazza Santo Spirito was moved here from its former position in the Piazza del Duomo.

== Bozzetto of Forteguerri Monument in London ==
The Victoria and Albert Museum in London has a small terracotta model or bozzetto that is attributed to Verrochio, perhaps the model selected in the initial competition. However, the provenance of the bozzetto is not complete, hence it is possible, that it was completed by some later artist. If the model only reflects Verocchio's work, it would be a prescient style for its time. Intended to be nearly three stories high, the Christ in a Mandorla is held aloft by four angels, while at the base, triangulating around the kneeling cardinal, are women emblematic of the three theologic virtues: Faith (on left, proffering the cross), Charity (atop, suckling an infant), and Hope (on right, gazing upward). The model has some elements whose style is archaic, while other elements are prescient of Baroque styles. For example, the benedicent Christ in the Mandorla is a typically medieval trope. The triangular arrangement of the three theologic virtues, is locked to an allegoric Renaissance vocabulary. However, the lone figure of the praying cardinal, surrounded by the animated figures, is almost baroque in its rendition, lacking the impassive rigid arrangement of much high-Renaissance sculpture.

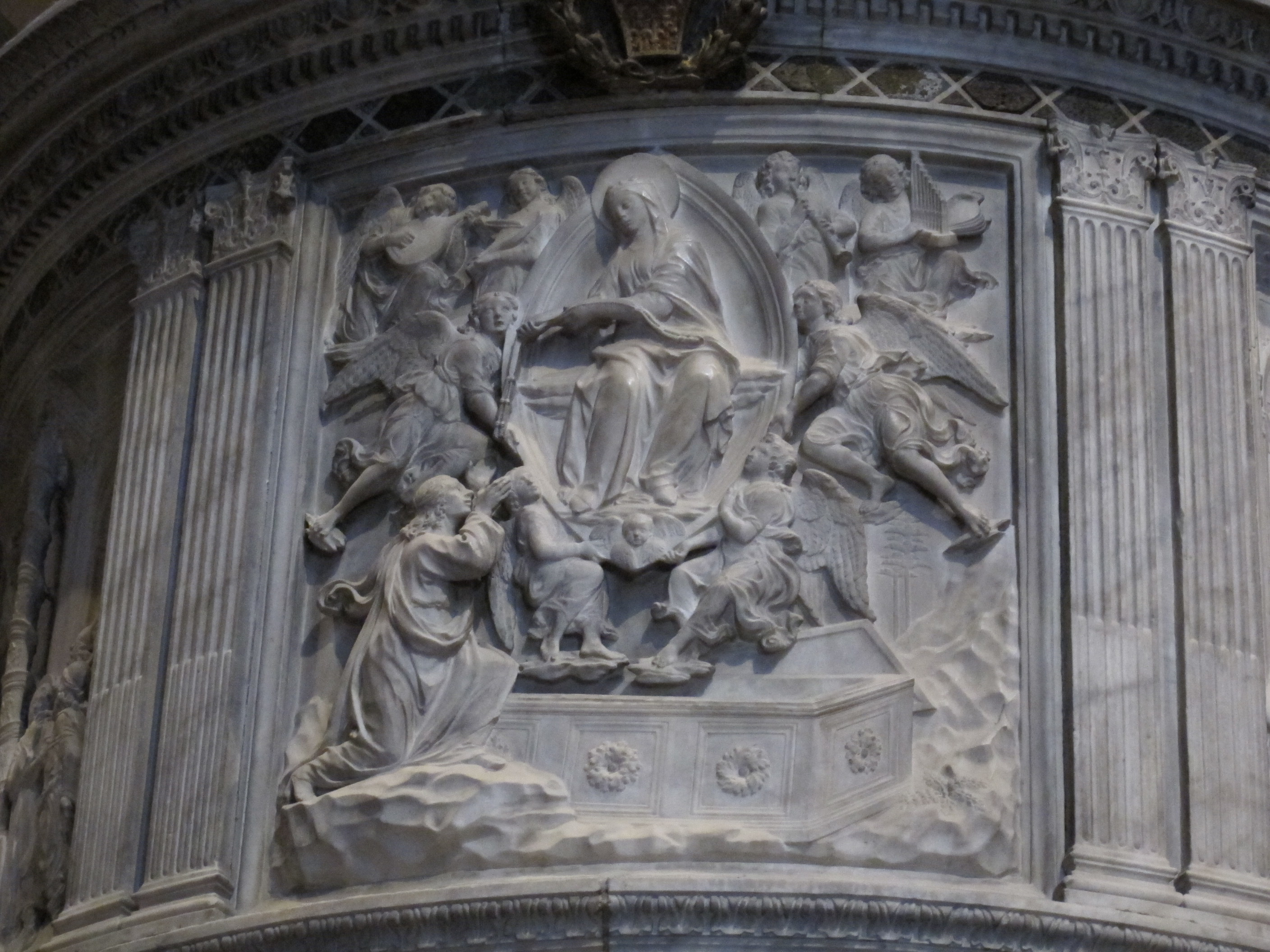
Prato Cathedral bas-relief (1473)

There are some similarities between the bozzetto and a bas-relief (1473) for the pulpit of Prato Cathedral, depicting the Madonna della Cintola (Our Lady of the Holy Girdle of Thomas). This bas-relief was sculpted by Antonio Rossellino and Mino da Fiesole, and depicts the Virgin inside a mandorla held aloft by angels.
