= Santo Spirito, Pistoia =

Roman Catholic church in Pistoia, Tuscany, Italy

Coordinates: 43°56′03″N 10°54′57″E

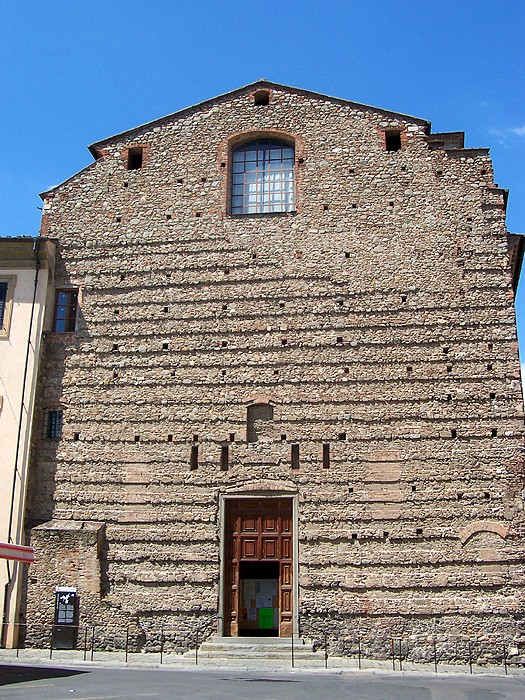
Facade of Santo Spirito

Santo Spirito, once called the church of Sant'Ignazio, is a Roman Catholic church in Pistoia, region of Tuscany, Italy.

== History ==
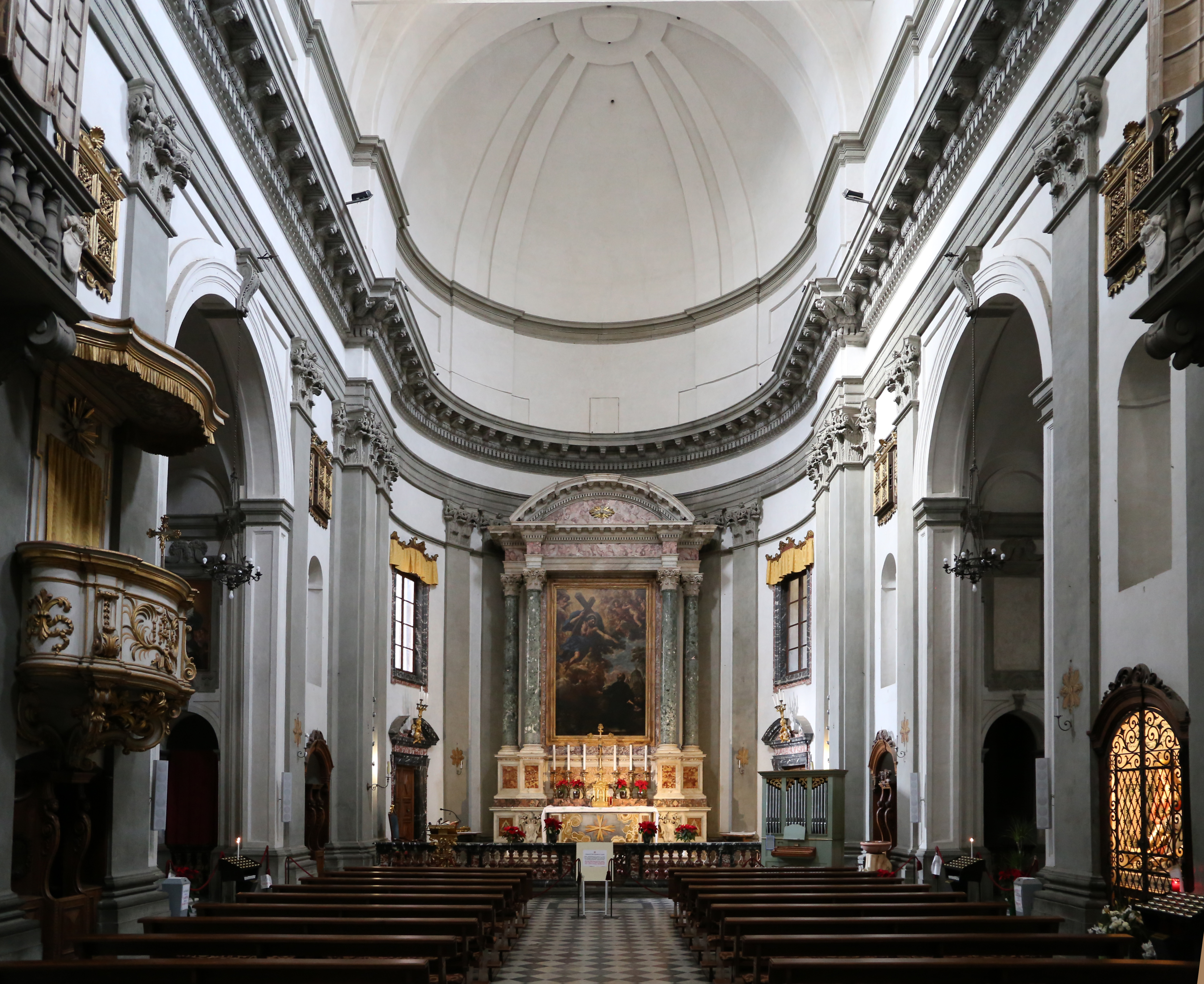
Interior towards main altar

The church was built by the Jesuits, who had settled in Pistoia by 1636. The funds for construction and interior decoration were given by the jurist Giovanni Visconti and the Pompeo Baly Gerosolimitano. Others involved included the Cardinal Rosipigliosi (later Pope Clement IX and nephew of Baly) and the bishop Alessandro Caccia. This bishop laid the first stone in 1647, and the interior was sumptuously decorated. The church was consecrated for service in 1685. The exterior remained incomplete, and is still only a rough brick facade. The Jesuits were expelled from the church and adjacent seminary in 1773, and replaced by the Congregation of the Holy Spirit leading to the change of dedication.

During 1965-1988, the church underwent restoration to address structural faults.

== Description ==
Outside of the church is a large Monument to Cardinal Niccolo Forteguerri, depicting the standing cardinal, sculpted by Cesare Sighinolfi. The statue was originally place in the Piazza del Duomo.

The interior decorations and design included contributions by some of the major figures of Baroque art in Rome. The interior architectural design with Corinthian columns and pilasters was by the Jesuit Tommaso Ramignani, with help by Andrea Pozzi, also of the order. The layout is of a single nave with four lateral chapels and ends in a domed apse. The green marble columns flanking the main altar were spolia from Villa Giulia, Rome, sent here by Pope Clement IX. The polychrome main altar, which includes alabaster frames, may have been designed by Bernini. The ciborium or tabernacle is made from precious multicolor stones, including lapis lazuli and metals, and was donated by Pope Alexander VII.

== Gallery of altarpieces and monuments ==
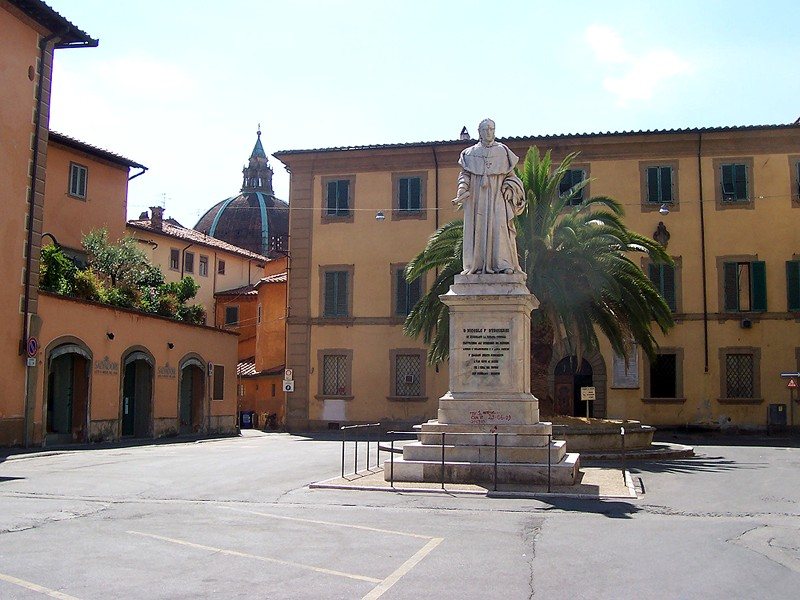
Statue of Forteguerra in Piazza Santo Spirito

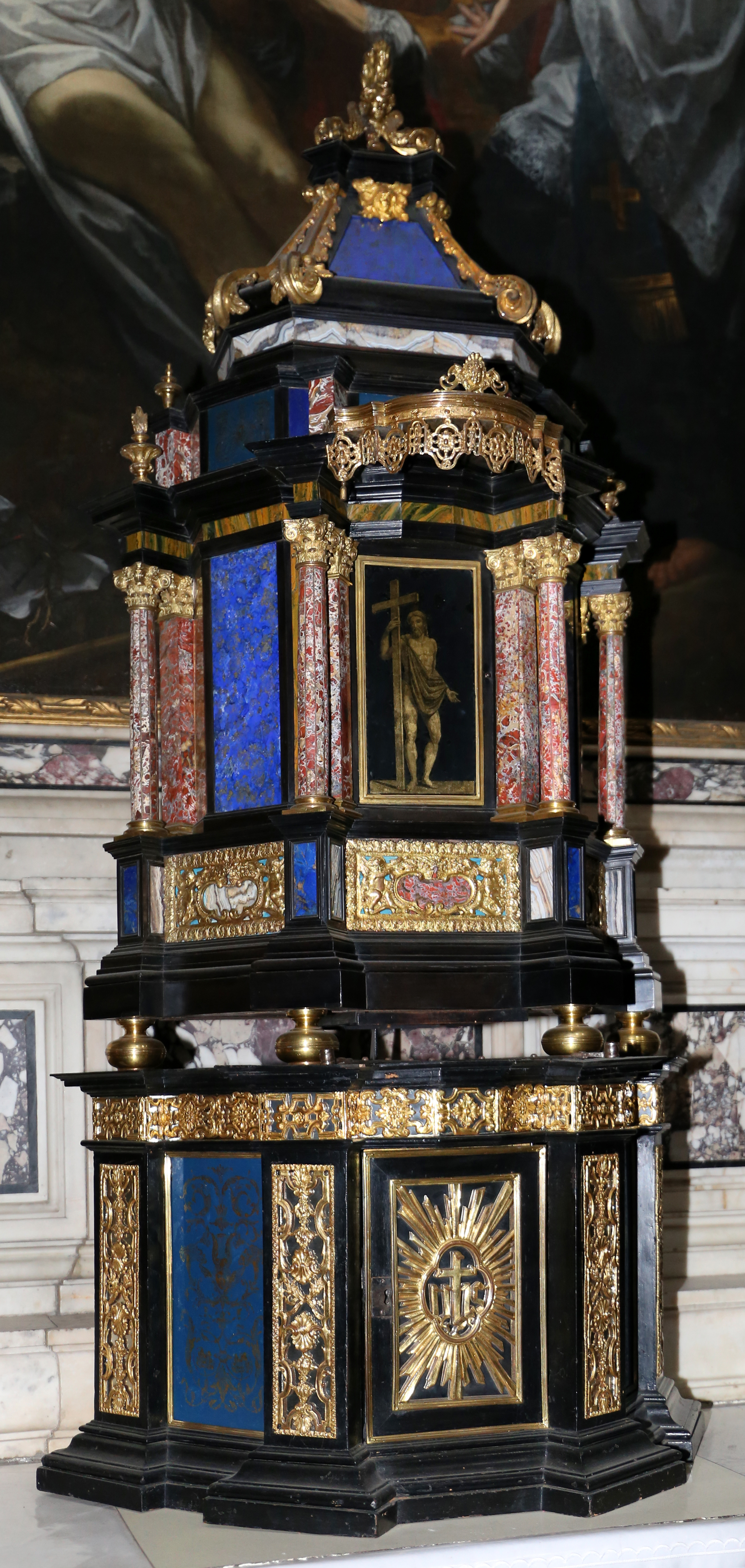
Ciborium in Pietra Dura

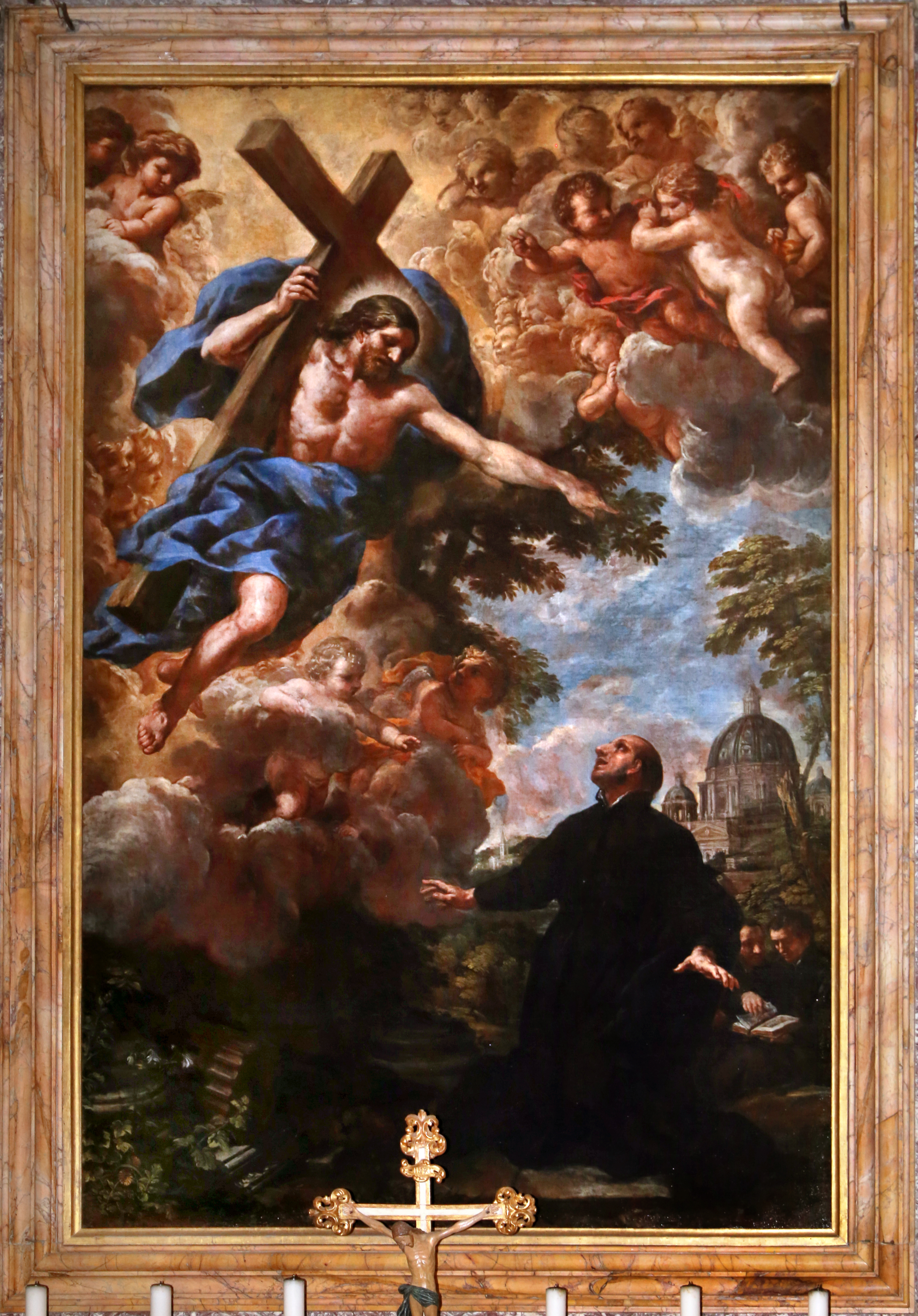
Apparition of Christ to St Ignatius by Pietro da Cortona (main altarpiece)

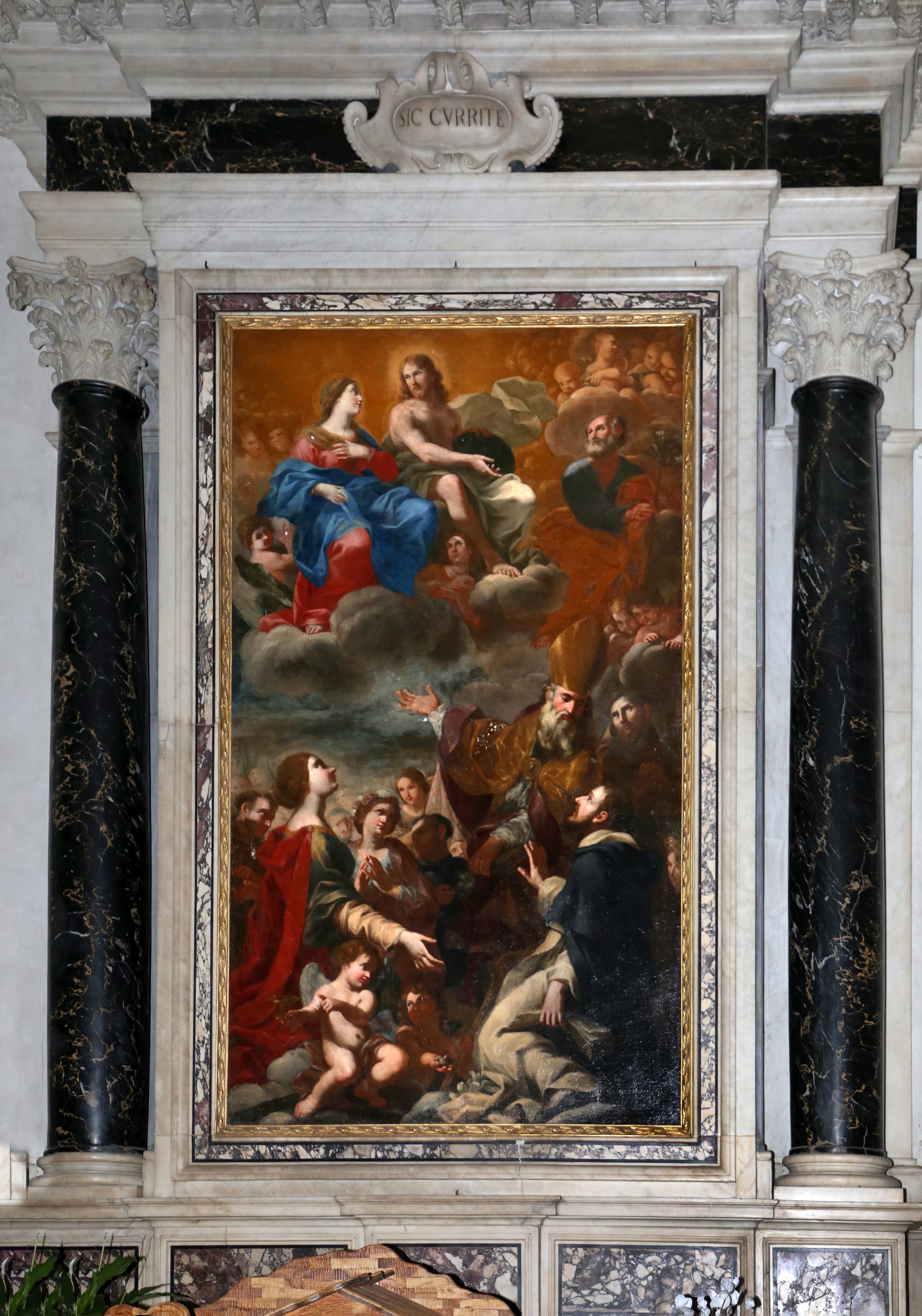
Virgin and Christ in Glory with St Liborius, Dominic, Lucy and others by Ludovico Gimignani (Rospigliosi chapel)

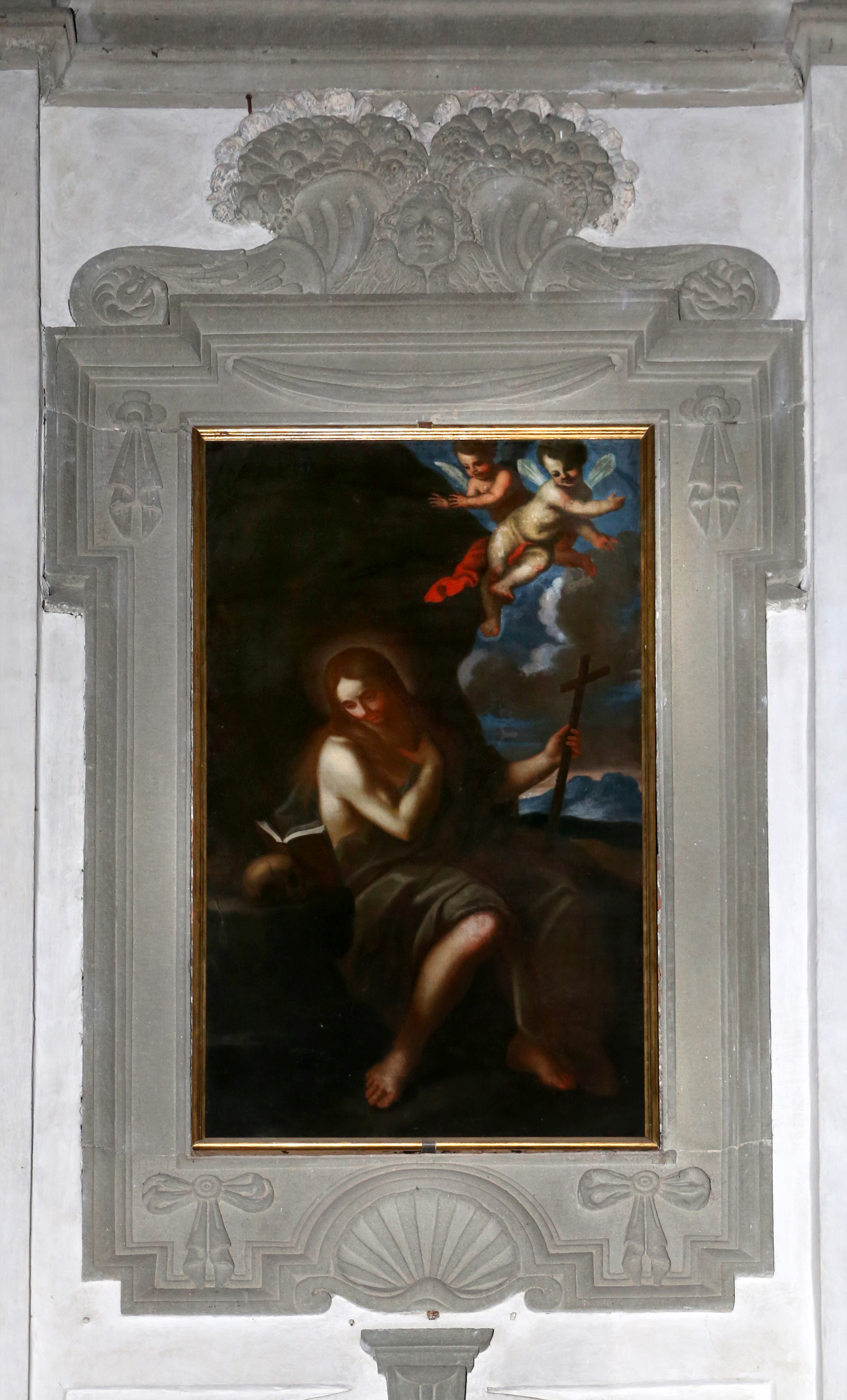
Penitent Magdalen by Gimignani

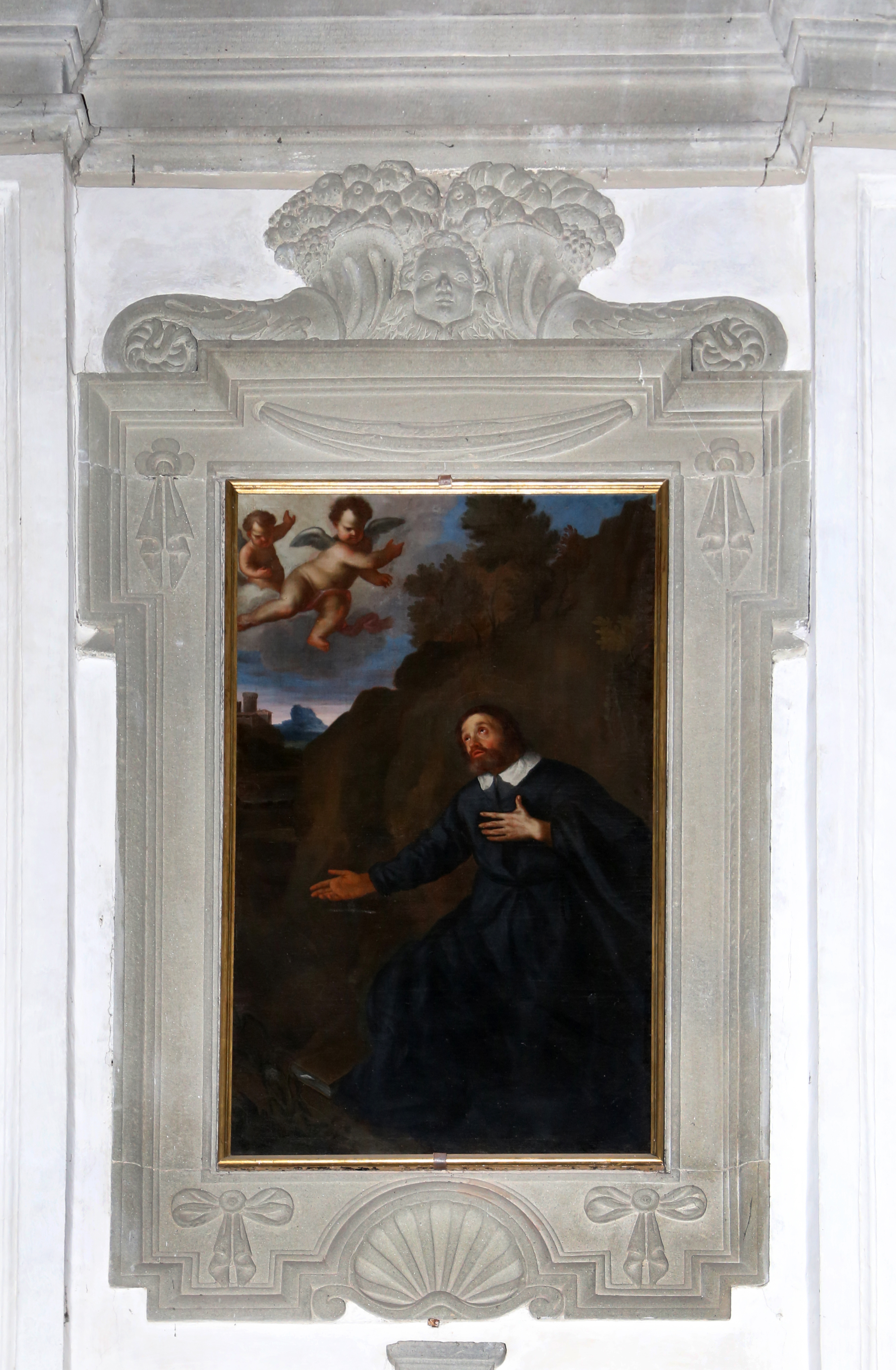
St Phillip Neri in Extasis by Gimignani

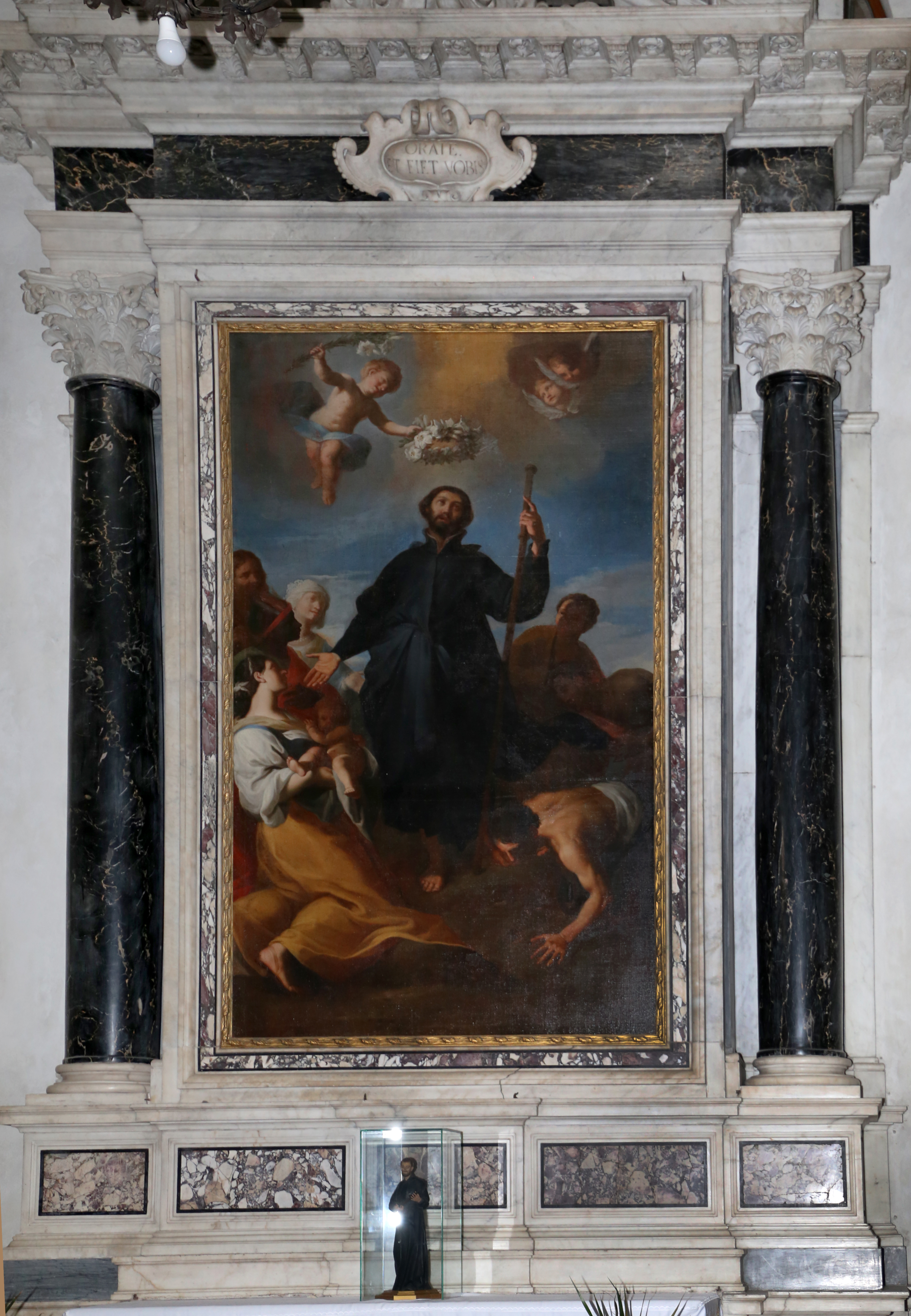
St Francis Xavier baptizing an Indian by studio of Andrea Pozzo (Sozzifanti chapel)

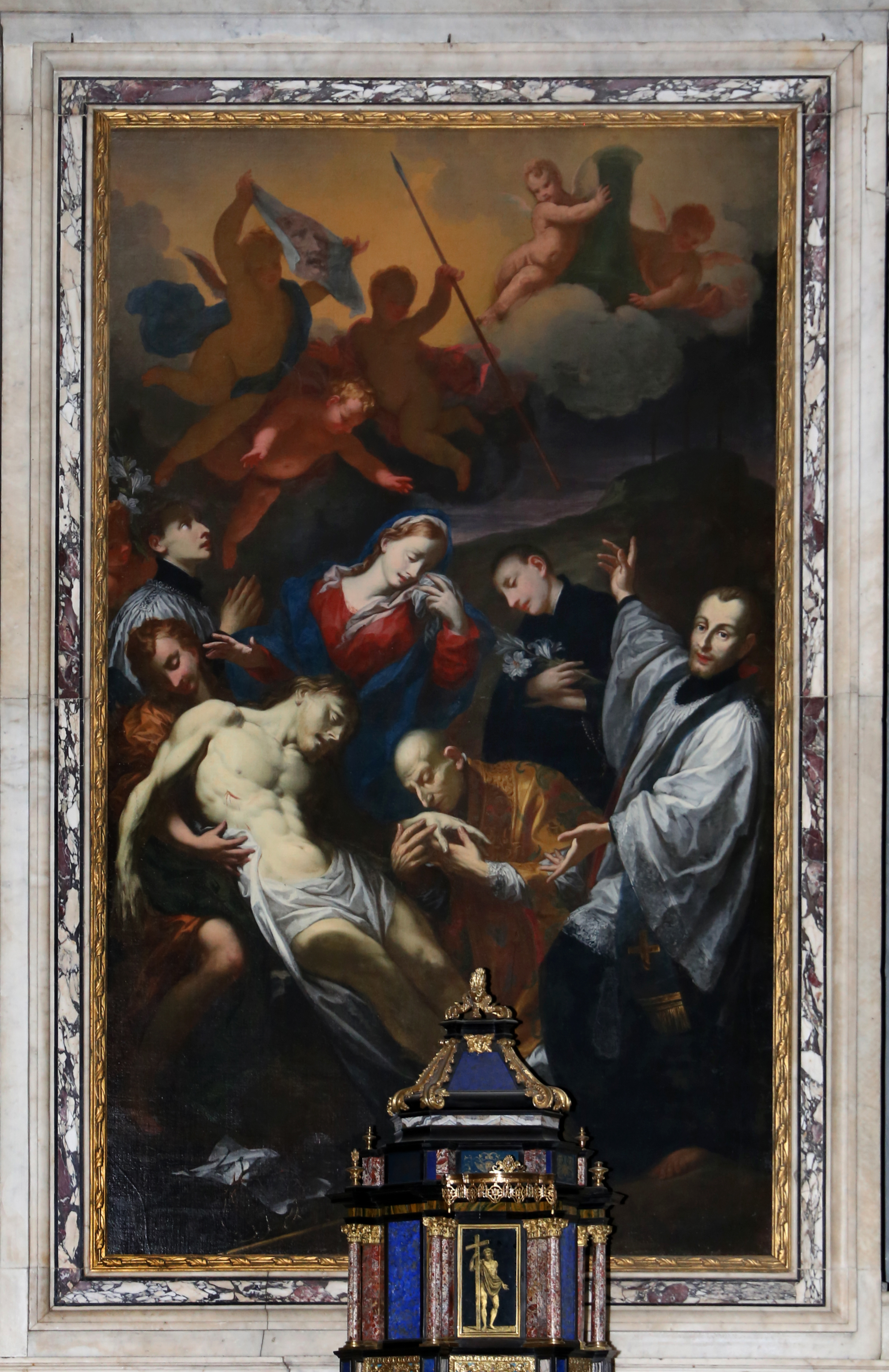
Deposition of Christ with Saints by Ottaviano Dandini (Banchieri chapel)

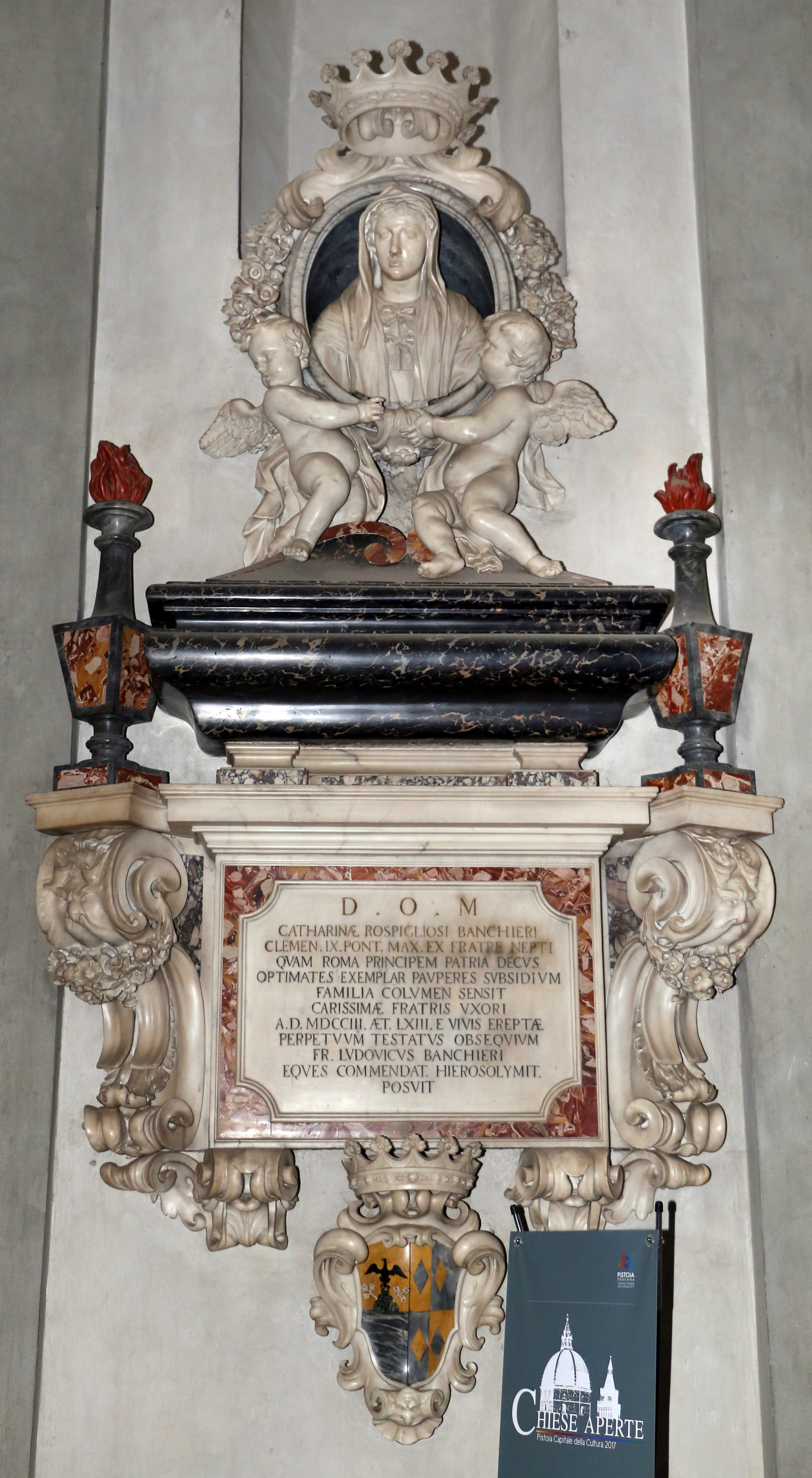
Funeral monument to Caterina Rospigliosi by Andrea Vaccà

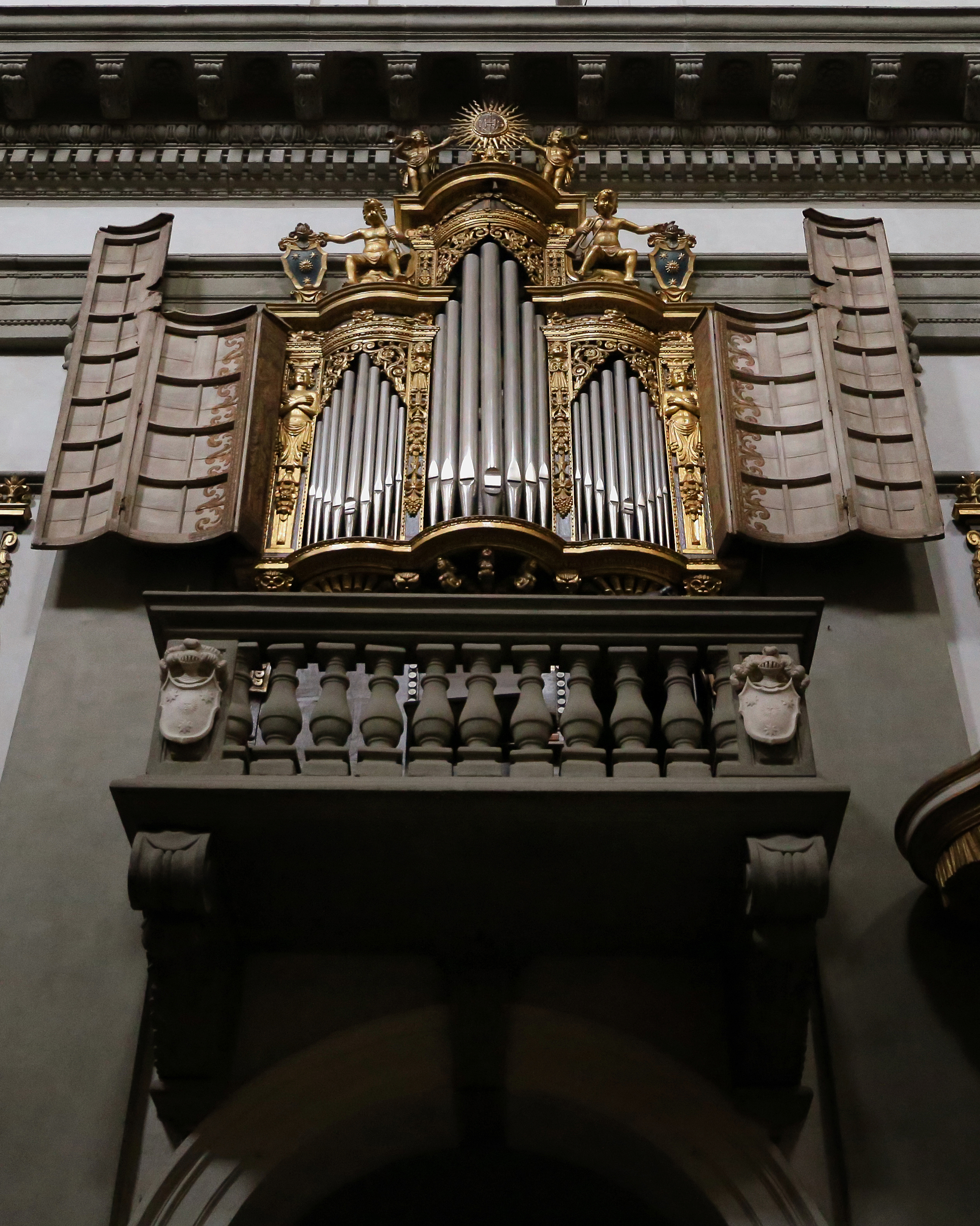
17th-century organ by Willem Hermans
