= Piazza Madonna =

Altarpiece by Andrea del Verrocchio and his workshop

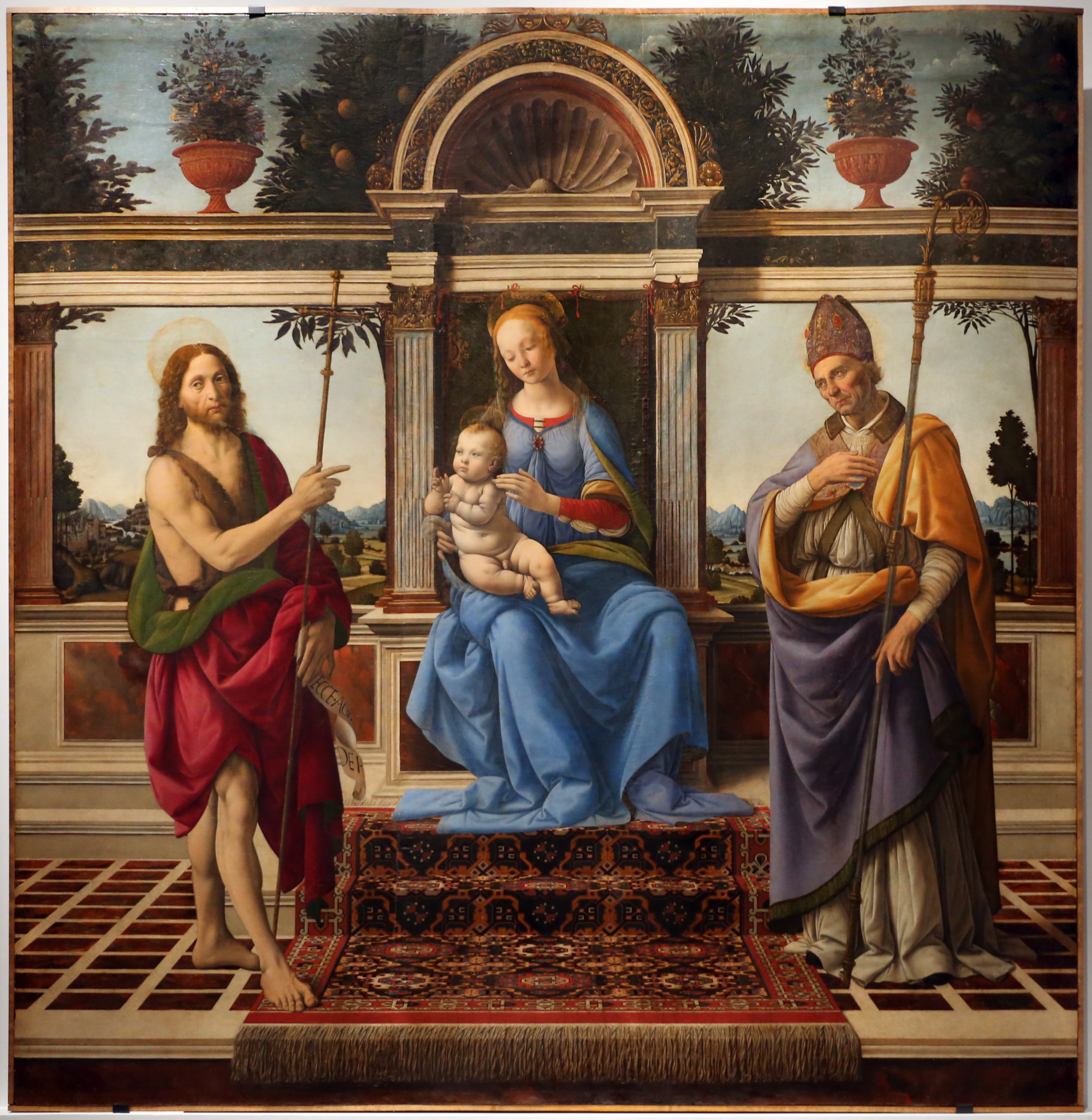
- Artist: Andrea del Verrocchio and Lorenzo di Credi
- Year: 1474-1479 and 1485-1486
- Medium: tempera on panel
- Location: Pistoia Cathedral

The Piazza Madonna (Italian - Madonna di Piazza) is a tempera on panel painting, dating to 1474-1486 and held in Pistoia Cathedral.

It was commissioned from Andrea del Verrocchio in 1474 as an altarpiece for the oratory of the Madonna di Piazza (the "Virgin of the Square"). It was intended to commemorate bishop Donato de' Medici, whose name saint Donatus of Fiesole stands to the right, with Florence's patron saint John the Baptist to the left. It was painted in two parts, with heavy involvement from Verrochio's studio assistants, particularly Lorenzo di Credi. The first part was finished in 1479, but the second phase was postponed until 1485 thanks to delays in payment. The painting was finally completed in 1486.

18th century local historians attributed the work to Leonardo da Vinci, based on a note made by the artist on a folio now in the Uffizi which records that in the month of "...bre" 1478 he began "two Virgin Maries", one of which is usually identified as the Garofano Madonna. Today Leonardo, twenty-two in 1474, is thought to have had no involvement in the painting of the Piazza Madonna beyond one compartment of the predella which corresponds to an autograph drawing of a head of the Virgin by him - that panel is now in the Louvre and the drawing is no. 438 E in the Gabinetto dei Disegni e delle Stampe of the Uffizi.

The painting originally had a predella, whose panels are now dispersed among several museums. Credi's St Donatus and the Tax Collector (Worcester Art Museum) is identified as one of them, whilst Perugino's Birth of the Virgin Mary and Miracle of the Snow are both also sometimes thought to have been part of this predella
