= Bridget of Fiesole =

Irish saint

St. Bridget of Fiesole

Nun, Abbess
- Born: 9th century Ireland
- Died: Italy
- Venerated in: Catholic Church; Italy
- Feast: 1 February

St. Bridget of Fiesole is an Irish Saint whose festival is celebrated in Italy on 1 February.

== Life ==
Born in Ireland to noble parents, she was sister to Andrew of Fiesole. She and her brother were pupils of Donatus, later bishop of Fiesole. In 816, Andrew accompanied Donatus on a pilgrimage to Italy, where after seeing the holy sites, they intended to establish a hermitage. Instead, in 829, Donatus became bishop of Fiesole and made Andrew his archdeacon.

Donatus died around 876, and Andrew a few years later at the Monastery of San Martino di Mensola at Fiesole, which he had founded at Donatus' suggestion. Andrew was anxious to see his sister before dying. Bridget left Ireland to pay him a visit and arrived in time to find him still alive but near his end. Pious accounts would later relate that she had been conveyed by angels.

After her brother's death, she is said to have retired to a secluded life in a cave in the Appeninnes, where she closed her life some time in the ninth century. Soon after a church was built over her cave, which contained her grave. She is mentioned in the Martyrology of Tallaght.
