= Monument to Niccolò Fortiguerra, Piazza di Santo Spirito, Pistoia =

Coordinates: 43.°N 10.°E

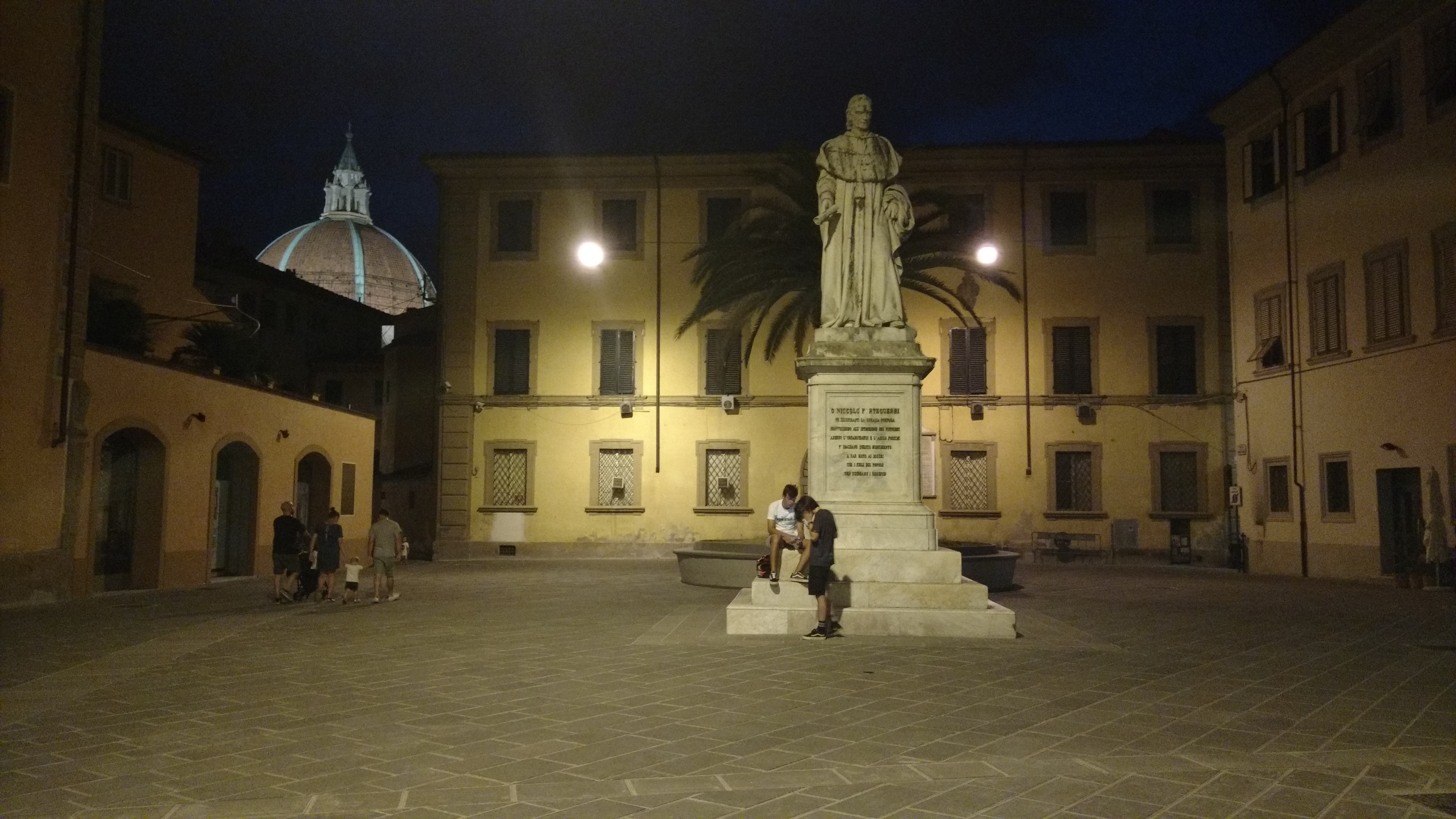
Monument to Forteguerri

The Monument to Niccolò Fortiguerra is a marble statue of the Cardinal Fortiguerra, a prominent 15th-century benefactor of Pistoia, who endowed the city with a school for the indigent and a library (Biblioteca Forteguerriana). The latter still exists in the city. The statue stands atop a simple high marble pedestal in the piazza of Santo Spirito, in Pistoia, region of Tuscany, Italy.

== History and description ==
Construction was patronized by a posthumous endowment in the 19th century by Niccolò Puccini, who was likely endeared to his fellow Pistoian, with whom he shares first name, for also being a philanthropist in causes for indigent children. He engaged the sculptor Cesare Sighinolfi to complete the larger-than-life statue which shows the Cardinal offering a document. The statue was originally placed in August 1863 in the Piazza of the Duomo.
