= Donatus of Fiesole =

Italian Roman Catholic saint

Saint Donatus of Fiesole
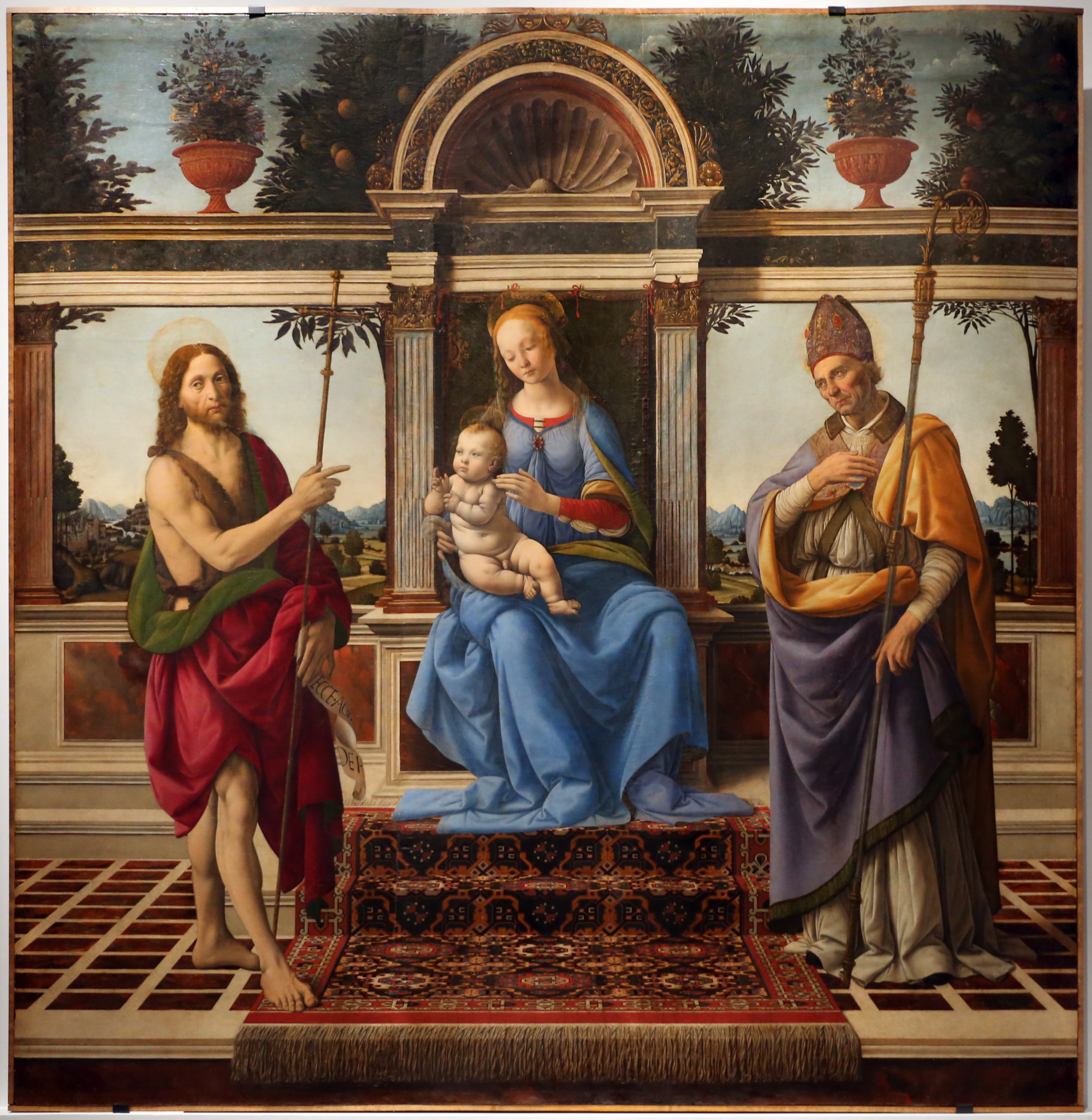
- Madonna with Saints John the Baptist and Donatus of Fiesole (1475–83, Andrea del Verrocchio, Pistoia Cathedral)

Bishop
- Born: Ireland
- Died: 876 AD
- Venerated in: Roman Catholic Church
- Major shrine: Fiesole Cathedral
- Feast: 22 October
- Attributes: depicted in the garb of a bishop with an Irish Wolfhound at his feet; also shown pointing out a church to his deacon Andrew the Scot

Donatus of Fiesole (died 876) was an Irish teacher and poet, and Bishop of Fiesole.

== Biography ==
Donatus was born in Ireland to noble parents towards the end of the eighth century. Despite there being little biographical detail in the tenth/eleventh-century Vita sancti Donati episcopi, Donatus is one of the better documented of the Irish peregrini.

There is reason to believe that he was educated in the monastic school of Inishcaltra, a little island in Lough Derg, near the Galway shore, now better known as Holy Island: so he was probably a native of that part of the country. He became a priest and, in the course of time, a bishop: he was greatly distinguished as a professor.

According to William Turner, writing in the Catholic Encyclopedia, in an ancient collection of the Vitae Patrum, of which an eleventh-century copy exists in the Laurentian Library of Florence, there is an account of the life of Donatus, which states that about 816 Donatus visited the tombs of the Apostles in Rome with his friend, Andrew Scotus. They remained in Rome for a considerable time and then set out once more, directing their steps now towards Tuscany, till at length they reached Fiesole, where they entered the hospice of the monastery, intending to rest there for a week or two, and then to resume their journey.

=== Bishop of Fiesole ===
Provost of Saint Donatus (1889) by Albrecht De Vriendt

In 829, Donatus was elected bishop of Fiesole. The traditional account relates that the people were praying to be sent a bishop to replace one drowned by the feudal lords. When Donatus entered the Cathedral of Saint Romulus, the bells spontaneously began ringing and the candles lit. The people took that for a sign their prayers had been heard. It is also possible that no locals wanted the position, given the fate of its previous incumbent.

Raised by popular acclaim to the See of Fiesole, Donatus made Andrew his archdeacon. He encouraged Andrew to restore the church of San Martino di Mensola and to found a monastery there.

Donatus founded a school in Florence under the patronage of Lothair, where he taught grammar and metrical composition for many years. In 840, he led a contingent of troops against the Saracens. He was in Rome in 844 when Louis II was crowned King of Italy, and for his subsequent coronation as emperor in 850. Also in 850, he gave the Church of St. Brigid at Piacenza to Columbanus' abbey at Bobbio, provided that they establish there a hospice for Irish pilgrims. Piacenza was an important stop on the Via Francigena. He joined the king and the pope in judging a dispute between the bishops of Arezzo and Siena. He also attended the Roman synod of Pope Nicholas I on 18 November 861.

The church of Fiesole had suffered much in its property and prerogatives from the emperors, and the Normans had destroyed its charters. Donatus applied for redress to the emperor Louis, who in 866 granted his request. A confirmation of this grant was obtained subsequently by Donatus from Charles the Bald at Placentia, with the condition annexed that anyone who infringed it should pay the church thirty pounds of gold. Donatus served as a bishop, teacher, and public administrator for forty-seven years.

He was buried in the cathedral, where his epitaph, dictated by himself, may still be seen. In it he alludes to his birth in Ireland, his years in the service of the princes of Italy (Lothair and Louis), his episcopate at Fiesole, and his activity as a teacher of grammar and poetry.

== Works ==
Donatus did much to promote the cult of Brigid of Kildare and composed a metrical "Life of St. Brigid". When it was printed by Colgan in 1647, the text was attributed to Coelan, an Irish monk of the eighth century, and only its foreword, which refers to previous Lives by Ultan and Aileran, was ascribed to the pen of Donatus.

His Life of Saint Brigid is interspersed with short lyrical poems. The best known of these is the twelve-line poem in which he describes the beauty and fertility of his native land, and the prowess and piety of its inhabitants.

Like Columkille, Donatus always cherished a tender, regretful love for Ireland; and like him also, he wrote a short poem in praise of it which is still preserved. It is in Latin, and the following is a translation, made by a Dublin poet many years ago:

Far westward lies an isle of ancient fame, By nature bless'd; and Scotia is her name,
Enroll'd in books: exhaustless is her store, Of veiny silver, and of golden ore.
Her fruitful soil, for ever teems with wealth, With gems her waters, and her air with health;
Her verdant fields with milk and honey flow; Her woolly fleeces vie with virgin snow;
Her waving furrows float with bearded corn; And arms and arts her envied sons adorn!
No savage bear, with lawless fury roves, Nor fiercer lion, through her peaceful groves;
No poison there infects, no scaly snake Creeps through the grass, nor frog annoys the lake;
An island worthy of its pious race, In war triumphant, and unmatch'd in peace!

According to Donatus, St. Brigid visited his deathbed to give him spiritual strength and comfort. (A similar story is told of his archdeacon Andrew, whose sister Bridget miraculously arrives from Ireland shortly before his death.) Donatus's story, preserved in manuscript in the Laurentian Library in Florence, recounts that Brigid flew to his deathbed, and before she touched him, she hung her cloak on a sunbeam to dry.

== Veneration ==
His feast day is 22 October. The numerous locations and churches incorporating his name, San Donato, provide evidence of his influence and popularity throughout Tuscany. His remains lie buried in an altar dedicated to him in the Cattedrale di San Romolo, (Duomo di Fiesole).

== See also ==
- Saint Donatus of Fiesole, patron saint archive

== Bibliography ==
- Benjamin Bossue, "De S. Donato episc. et confes., Fesulis in Tuscia," Acta Sanctorum Octobris, Tomus Nonus. Bruxelles: Alphonsus Greuse 1858, pp. 648–662. (in Latin)
- Lanigan, John (1822). An Ecclesiastical History of Ireland: From the First Introduction of Christianity Among the Irish to the Beginning of the Thirteenth Century. Vol. III. Dublin: Graisberry. pp. 280–285.
