= Andrew the Scot =

9th-century Italian Catholic saint

Saint Andrew the Scot
- Born: 800s Ireland
- Died: c. 877; Fiesole, Italy
- Venerated in: Roman Catholicism, Eastern Orthodoxy
- Major shrine: Saint Martin, Fiesole, Italy
- Feast: 22 August
- Attributes: deacon curing a paralytic girl; sometimes shown appearing to a sleeping priest; Irish Wolfhound

Andrew the Scot (also known as Andrew of Tuscany and Andrew of Fiesole) was the Irish-born student and assistant of Donatus of Fiesole. He served as archdeacon of Fiesole under Bishop Donatus.

== Life ==
Andrew the Scot was born in Ireland near the beginning of the ninth century to a noble family. (He later became known as “the Scot”, common in that day when speaking of someone from Ireland, which the Romans had called Scotia.)

He was the brother of Bridget of Fiesole. Both Andrew and his sister studied under Donatus. In 816, Andrew accompanied Donatus on his pilgrimage to Italy.

When Donatus and Andrew arrived at Fiesole, the people were assembled to elect a new bishop. Donatus was chosen, and after being consecrated to that office, made Andrew his archdeacon.

There is a miracle reported of his healing the daughter of a nobleman. The girl had been paralysed, and the doctors were unable to help her, so their father asked Andrew to come and pray for her. Kneeling by her couch, he told her to stand, for Jesus had healed her. Many other miracles were performed by him over the course of his deaconship in Fiesole: casting out demons, healing the blind, and the sick.

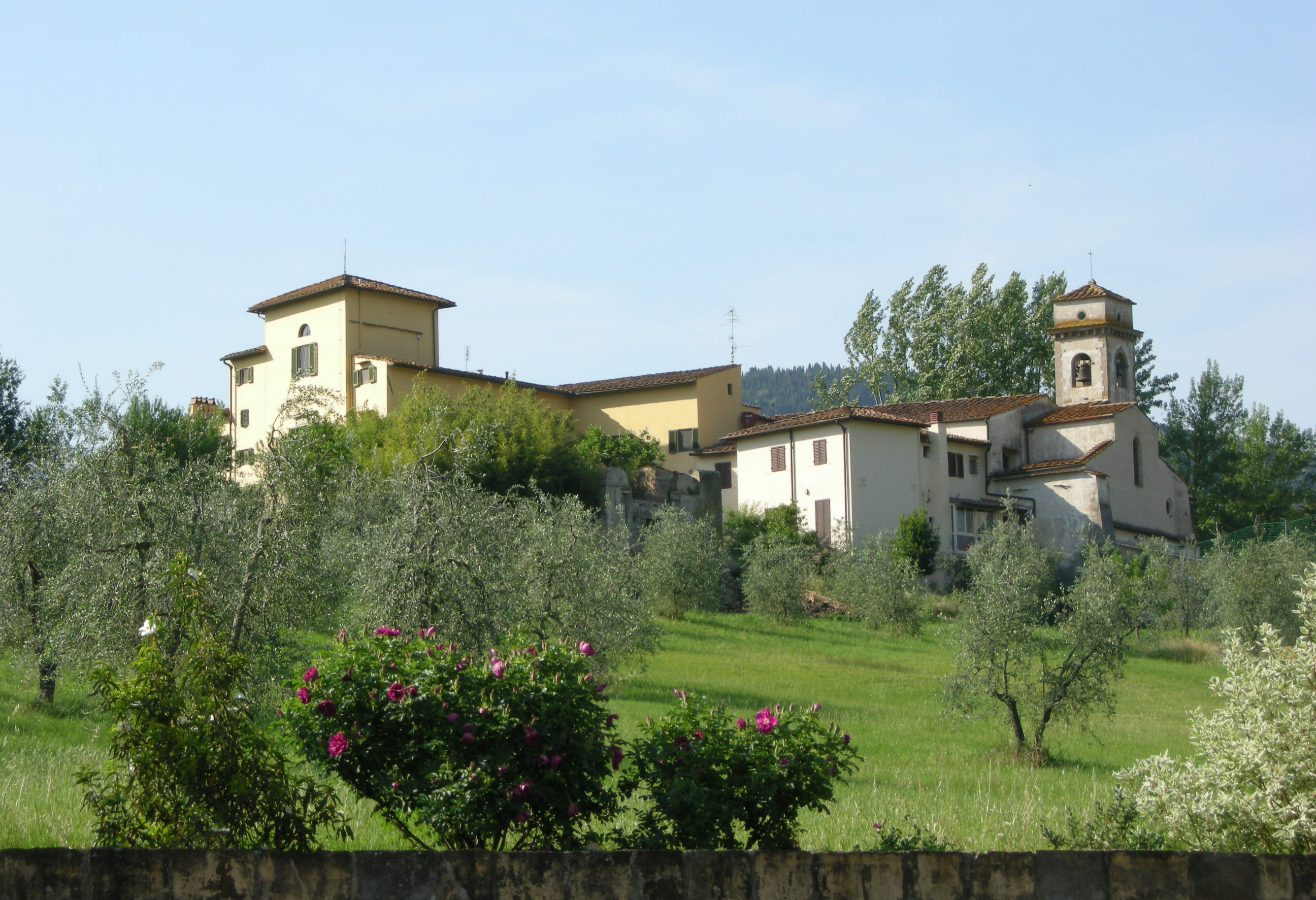
San Martino a Mensola

During the forty-seven years of Donatus' episcopate, Andrew served him faithfully. The bishop encouraged Andrew to restore the church of San Martino di Mensola and to found a monastery there. Andrew is commended for his austerity of life and boundless charity to the poor.

He died a few years after Donatus around 880. His sister, seemingly miraculously, arrived from Ireland in time to assist at his deathbed.

== Veneration ==
His body is buried at St Martin's, the church he restored. When, at a later date, his remains were exhumed, his body was found still preserved. His relics continue to be venerated in that church.

Andrew's feast day is 22 August.

== Sources ==
- Saint of the Day, August 22: Andrew of Fiesole at SaintPatrickDC.org
