= Niccolò Fortiguerra =

Italian military leader

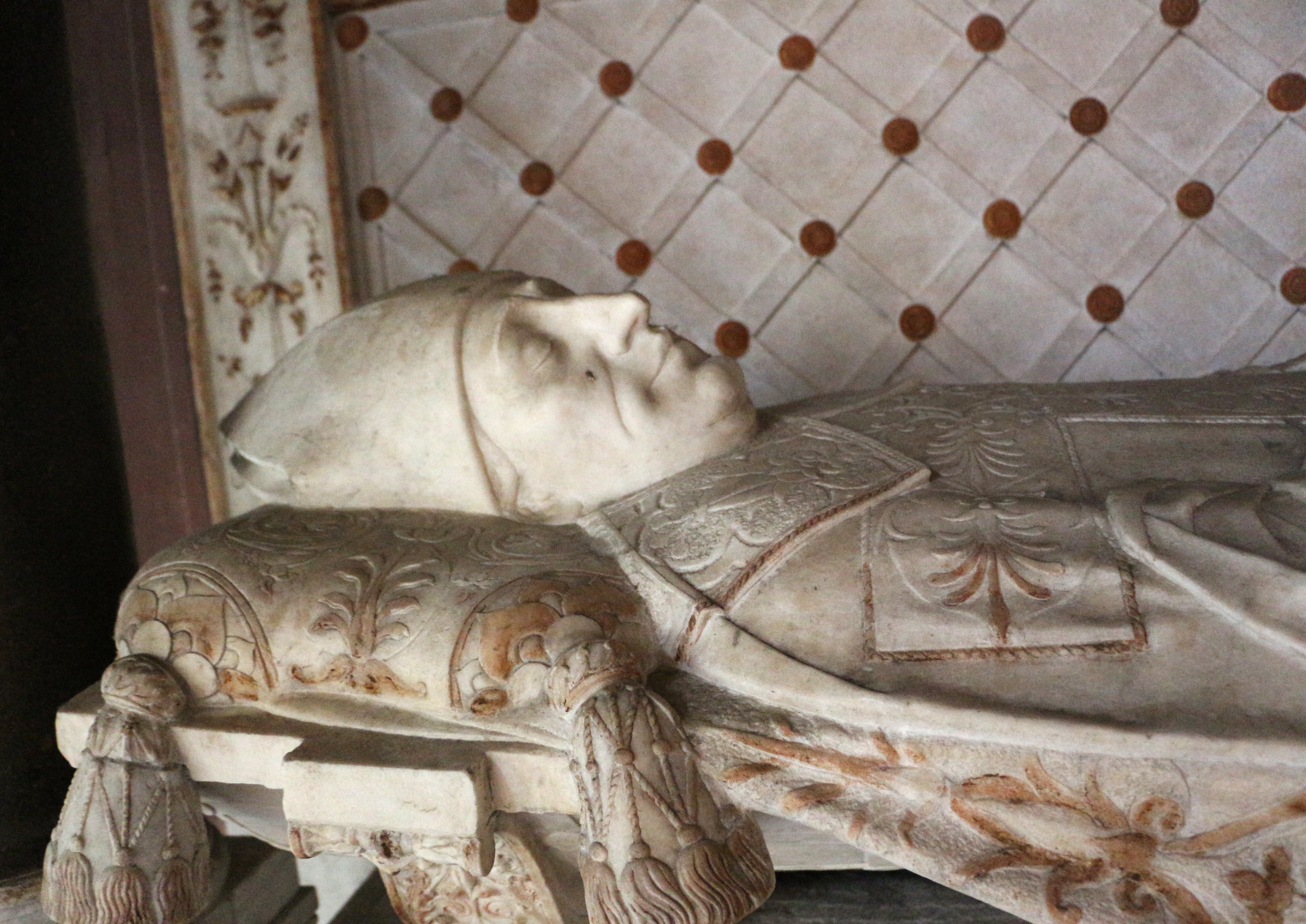
Monument in Santa Cecilia, Rome

Niccolò Fortiguerra (also spelled Forteguerri) (1419 — 1473) was an Italian papal legate, military commander, and Cardinal. (Note: Not to be confused with Niccolò Fortiguerra (1674–1735), bishop and poet, author of "Ricciardetto")

Born at Pistoia, he was related to Pope Pius II and is counted as a cardinal-nephew. He had a doctorate in utroque iure from the University of Siena.

He became bishop of Teano in 1458, and Cardinal in 1460. In 1462 he campaigned in the Papal States against Sigismondo Pandolfo Malatesta, taking Fano. Later, in 1465, he defeated Deifobo d'Anguillara in battle. Fortiguerra was unable to participate in the Papal conclave, 1464, which elected Pope Paul II. He did participate in the Papal conclave, 1471 which elected Pope Sixtus IV.

He endowed a library, the Biblioteca Forteguerriana, in Pistoia.

He died at Viterbo in 1473 and was buried at his titular church in Rome, Santa Cecilia in Trastevere. The Cathedral of Pistoia has a cenotaph Monument to Niccolò Fortiguerri, partially sculpted in the 15th century by Verrochio. There is a 19th-century outdoor statue Monument to Fortiguerra in Piazza di Santo Spirito of Pistoia.

== Notes ==
Catholic Church titles
Preceded by Alessandro Oliva	Camerlengo of the Sacred College of Cardinals; 1462	Succeeded by Jacopo Piccolomini-Ammannati
