= Nativity of the Virgin (Perugino) =

Painting by Pietro Perugino

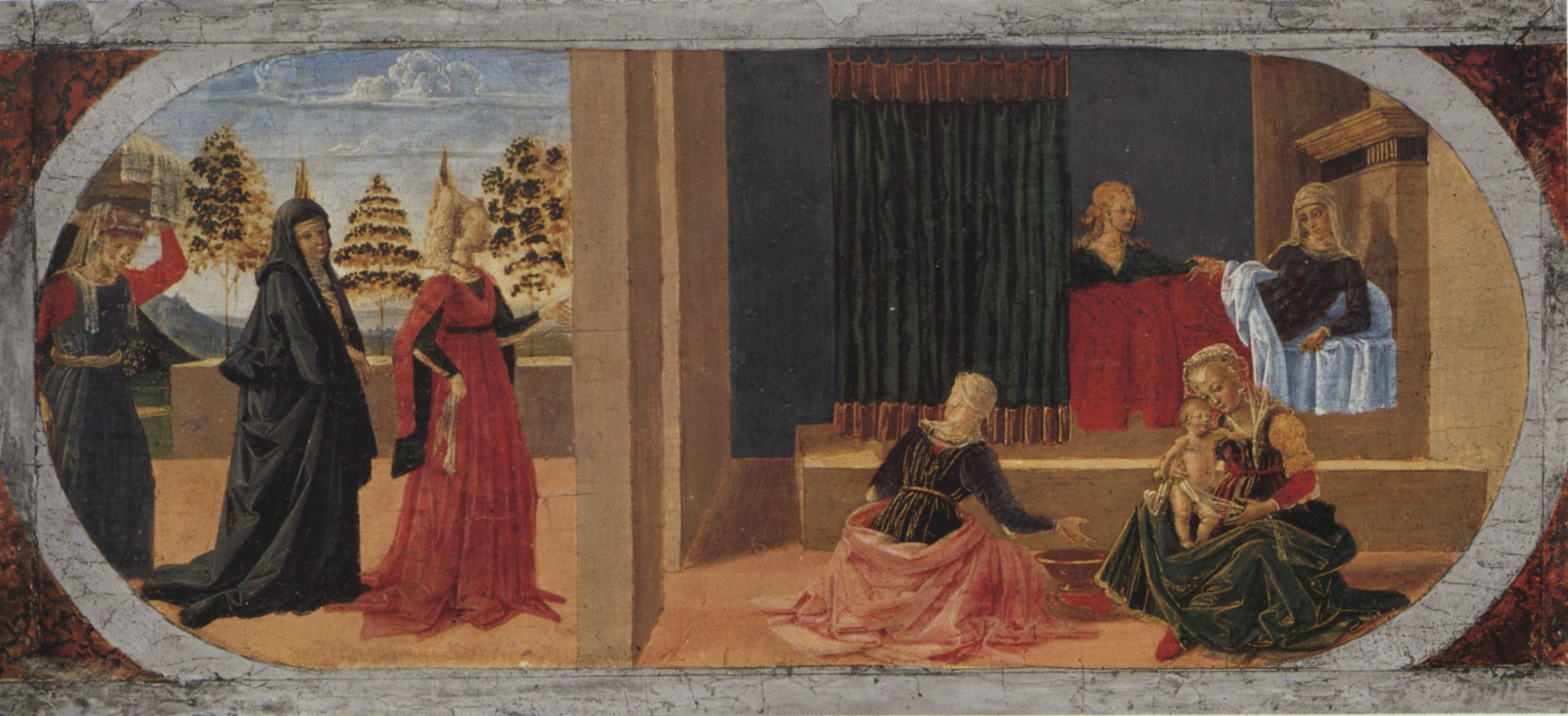
- Artist: Pietro Perugino
- Year: c. 1472
- Medium: Tempera on panel
- Dimensions: 18.6 cm × 41 cm (7.3 in × 16 in)
- Location: Walker Art Gallery, Liverpool

Nativity of the Virgin is a small painting in tempera on panel by Pietro Perugino, dating to around 1472. It is held in the Walker Art Gallery, in Liverpool. It shows the nativity of Mary. The style of the house is heavily influenced by Andrea del Verrocchio.

The painting belongs to Perugino's early period and the important commissions he gained during the short time he was active in Florence. Both it and the Miracle of the Snow are usually identified as one of two surviving parts of the same predella, either from a lost altarpiece of the Virgin Mary or from the Piazza Madonna by Verocchio's studio. Both panels were in the Pucci chapel in Santissima Annunziata in Florence by 1786, when they were bought by John Campbell. They were sold to different owners in London in 1804, with the Nativity bought by William Roscoe for nine guineas. At the time of the sale the painting was misattributed to Masaccio.

== Bibliography ==
- (in Italian) Vittoria Garibaldi, Perugino, in Pittori del Rinascimento, Scala, Florence, 2004 ISBN 888117099X
- (in Italian) Pierluigi De Vecchi, Elda Cerchiari, I tempi dell'arte, volume 2, Bompiani, Milan, 1999 ISBN 88-451-7212-0
- (in Italian) Stefano Zuffi, Il Quattrocento, Electa, Milan, 2004 ISBN 8837023154
