= Cesare Sighinolfi =

Italian sculptor (1833–1902)

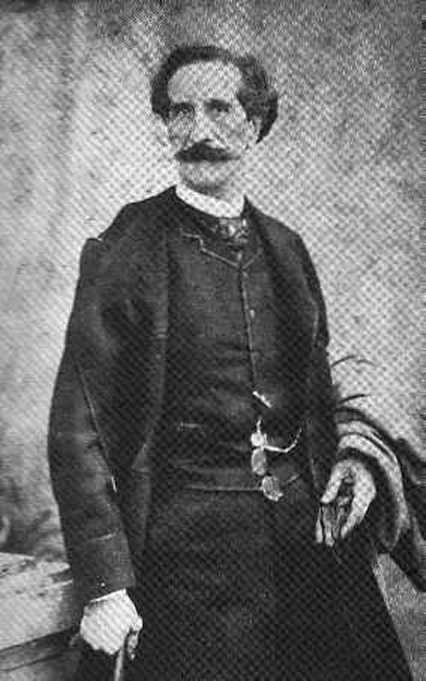
Cesare Sighinolfi.

Cesare Sighinolfi (1833 in Modena − 1902) was an Italian sculptor.

== Biography ==
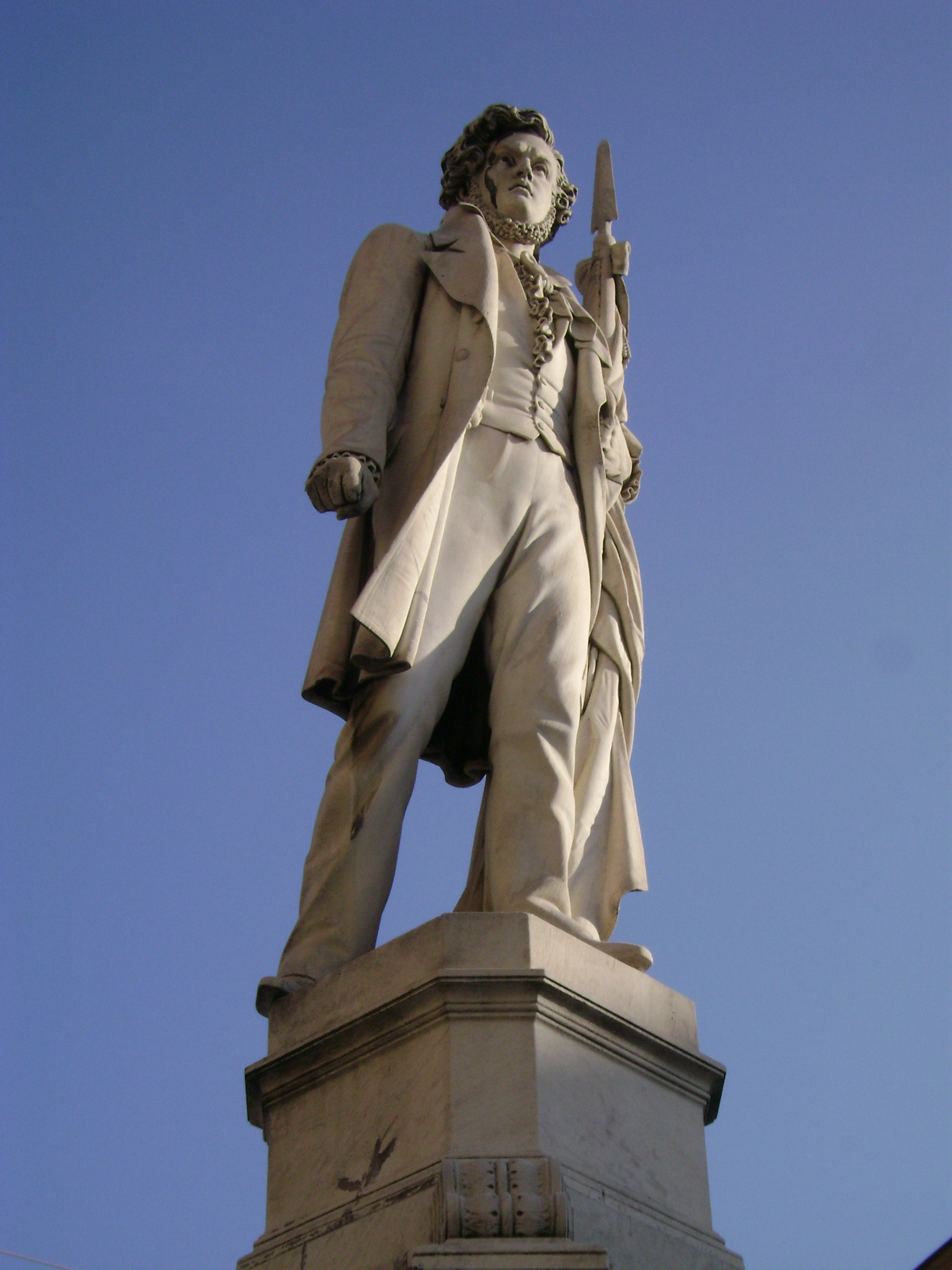
Monument to Menotti in Modena

His father, who built musical organs, wanted him to follow in the profession, but the boy inclined towards art, and he received early mentorship from the sculptor Luigi Mainoni, professor of the Academy of Modena. At the Modenese Academy, he won all the contests, and garnered a stipend to study in Florence, and where he was helped by the sculptor Giovanni Duprè and Pietro Cantini. His first essay in sculpture, submitted back to Modena, was a stucco of Drunkenness, that is, a life-size, dishevelled Bacchante drinking. Then he sent a group of two figures, shepherds and sheepdog. Sighinolfi won the first prize in a contest sponsored by Baron Ricasoli for the design of equestrian statues of Napoleon III and Victor Emmanuel. He also won a competition for the Monument to Fortiguerra, now erected in Piazza di Santo Spirito of Pistoia. He then sculpted a statue of an Apollonian young man entitled The Genius of the Revolution.

Sighinolfi received several commissions from the Portuguese royal family. He sculpted the portrait of the sitting King, in a sea captain uniform; the portrait of Queen Pia of Savoy and the portrait of Princes Carlos and Alfonso. These last two were depicted as babies, one resting on a pillow, the other gently lying in a shell. Queen Pia also commissioned: Love of country and Raccoglimento allo studio. The King of Portugal also commissioned a Leda and the Swan.

A larger than life statue of Ciro Menotti by Sighinolfi was erected on the square in Modena. He sculpted the monument of the Marquis Molza at the Modena Cemetery. Sighinolfi also sculpted a salacious statuary group: Obstinate imprudence, depicting a young girl being undressed by a playful dog. Among the many portraits, he depicted General Juan Prim y Prats, former Marshal of Spain; the work was commissioned by King Vittorio Emanuele and given to the General's widow. He made a bust of Emilio Castelar . Sighinolfi was awarded a number of medals and crosses from Italian and foreign governments.

Cesare Sighinolfi travelled to Bogotà, Colombia in 1880, invited by his mentor Pietro Cantini to help decorate the Teatro Cristobal Colon. He made monuments to Christopher Columbus and Isabelle the Catholic (1906).

In Bogota, Cesare Sighinolfi succeeded Alberto Urdaneta, as director of the School of Fine Arts of Bogotà: teaching alongside Luigi Ramelli and Pietro Cantini. In 1896, in Bogota, he completes a portrait of Rafael Reyes.
