= Miracle of the Snow =

Painting by Pietro Perugino

The Miracle of the Snow
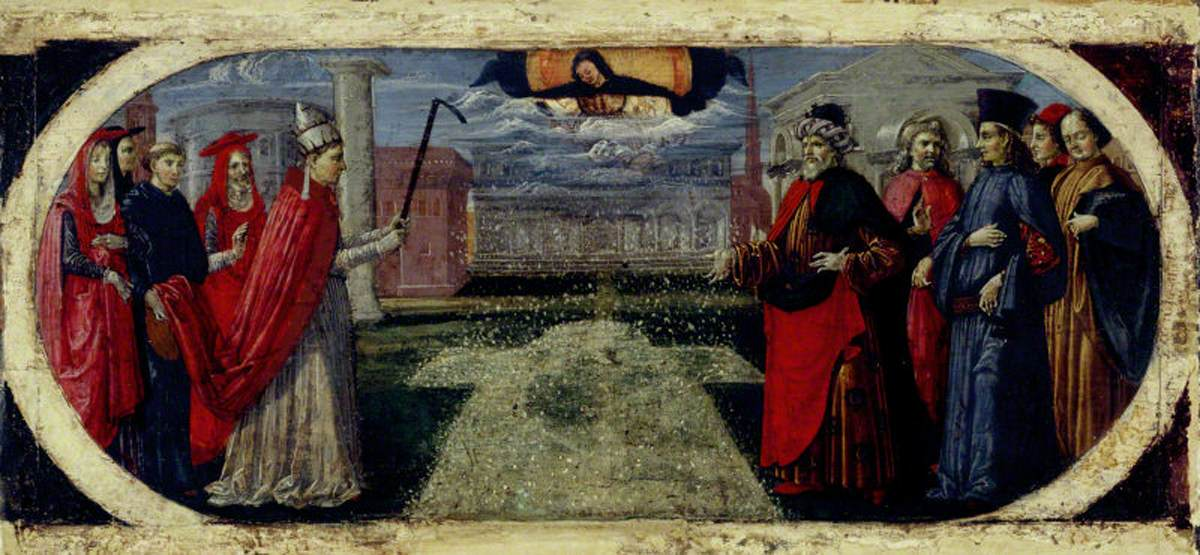
- Artist: Perugino
- Year: c. 1472–1474
- Medium: Tempera on panel
- Dimensions: 18,7 cm × 40 cm (74 in × 16 in)
- Location: Polesden Lacey

Miracle of the Snow is a painting in tempera on panel by Pietro Perugino, dating to around 1472–1474 and now in the collection of Polesden Lacey. It shows the miraculous fall of snow which marked the spot for the foundation of Santa Maria Maggiore in Rome in 352. The painting belongs to Perugino's early period and the important commissions he gained during the short time he was active in Florence. Both it and the Nativity of the Virgin are usually identified as one of two surviving parts of the same predella, either from a lost altarpiece of the Virgin Mary or from the Pala di San Martino a Strada by Andrea del Verrocchio's studio. Both predella panels were in the Pucci chapel in Santissima Annunziata in Florence by 1786, when they were bought by John Campbell. They were sold to different owners in London in 1804, with the Miracle entering the Polesden Lacey collection.

== Bibliography ==
- (in Italian) Vittoria Garibaldi, Perugino, in Pittori del Rinascimento, Scala, Florence, 2004 ISBN 888117099X
- (in Italian) Pierluigi De Vecchi, Elda Cerchiari, I tempi dell'arte, volume 2, Bompiani, Milan, 1999 ISBN 88-451-7212-0
- (in Italian) Stefano Zuffi, Il Quattrocento, Electa, Milan, 2004 ISBN 8837023154
