= Biblioteca Forteguerriana =

Public library in Pistoia, Italy

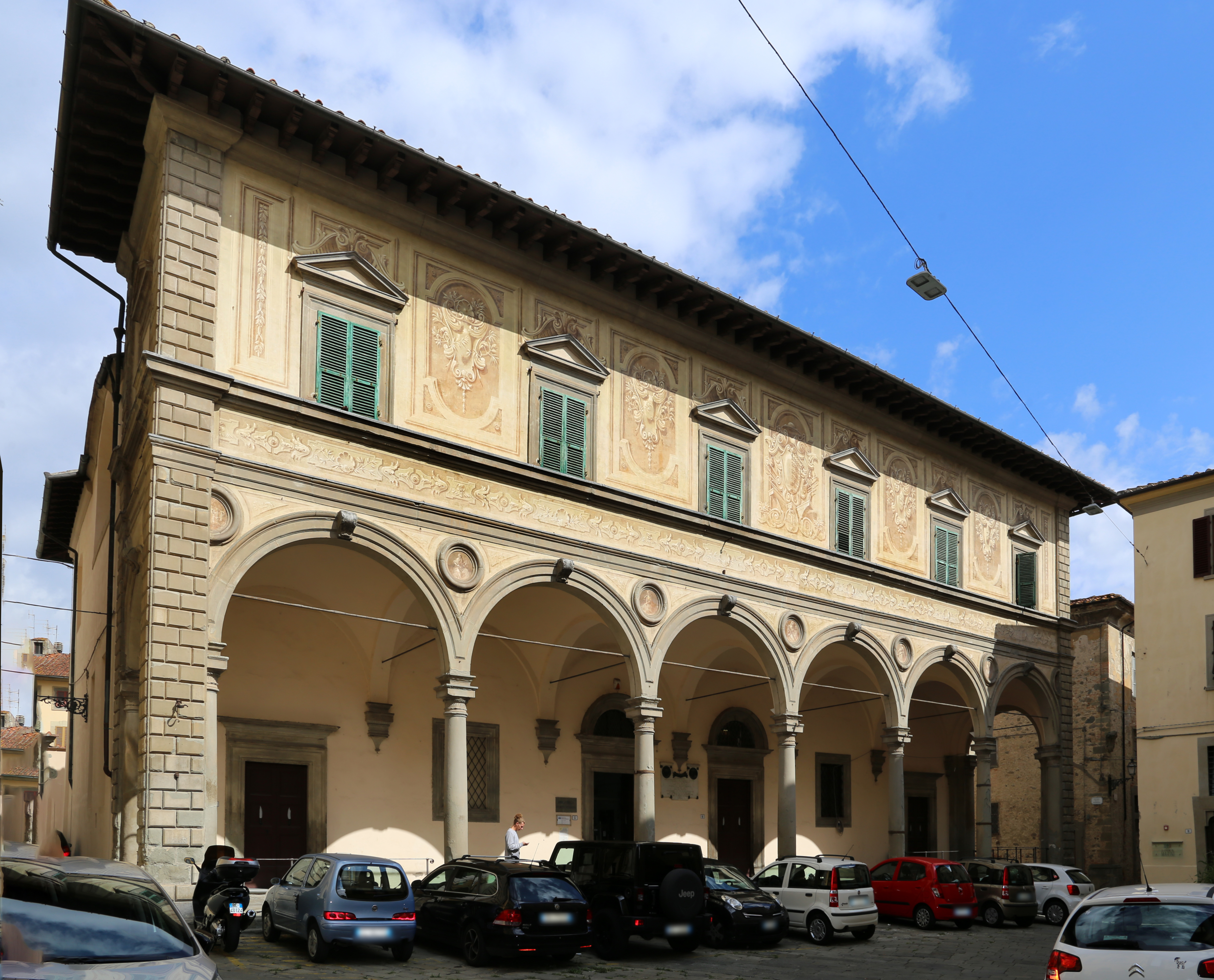
The Palazzo della Sapienza in Pistoia, which houses the Biblioteca Forteguerriana

The Biblioteca Forteguerriana is a public library in Pistoia, Italy, founded in 1473 by Niccolò Fortiguerra. In 1967 it became the Biblioteca comunale Forteguerriana. It currently occupies the Palazzo della Sapienza (built in 1533).

== See also ==
- Books in Italy
