= Pistoia Cathedral =

Roman Catholic cathedral in Pistoia, Tuscany, Italy

Pistoia Cathedral Cattedrale di San Zeno
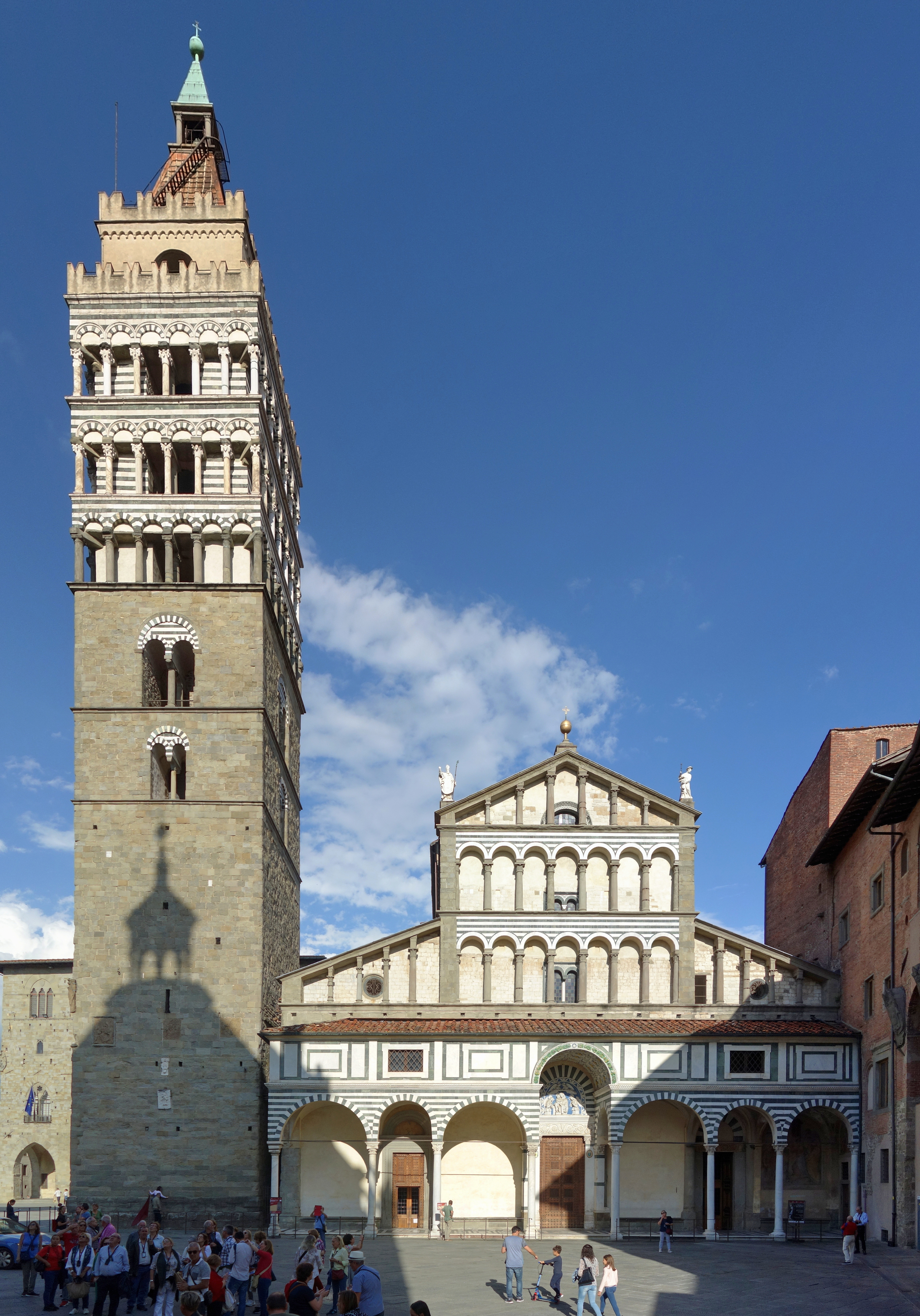
- Bell tower and west front on the Piazza del Duomo, Pistoia

Religion
- Affiliation: Roman Catholic
- Province: Diocese of Pistoia
- Region: Tuscany
- Ecclesiastical or organisational status: Cathedral
- Status: Active

Location
- Location: Pistoia, Italy
- Interactive map of Pistoia Cathedral; Cattedrale di San Zeno
- Coordinates: 43.933219°N 10.9179°E

Architecture
- Type: Church
- Style: Romanesque, Baroque

Specifications
- Direction of façade: West
- Dome: 1

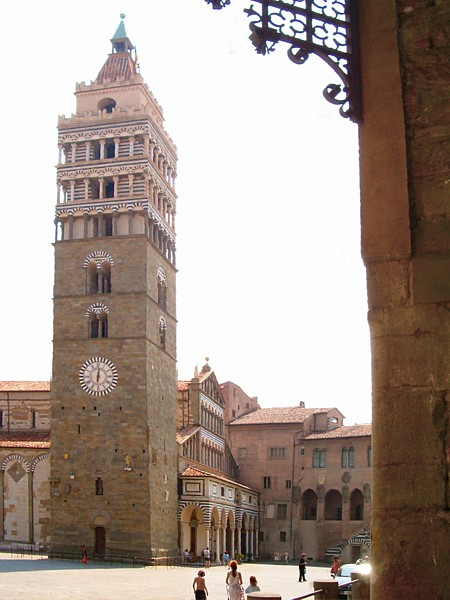
The bell tower

Pistoia Cathedral, or Cathedral of Saint Zeno (Italian: Duomo di Pistoia or Cattedrale di San Zeno) is the main religious building of Pistoia, Tuscany, central Italy, located in the Piazza del Duomo in the centre of the city. It is the seat of the Bishop of Pistoia and is dedicated to Saint Zeno of Verona.

Most probably built in the 10th century, it has a facade in Romanesque style, inspired by other churches in Pistoia (San Bartolomeo and San Jacopo). The interior has a nave and two side-aisles, with a presbytery and crypt. A restoration in 1952–1999 returned the church to its original lines.

== History ==
It has been speculated that a smaller cathedral may have existed in Pistoia as early as the 5th century, as it already had a bishop at that time. The location of such a building is however unknown: possible sites are those of the current cathedral, of the Pieve di Sant'Andrea or of San Pier Maggiore.

The first mention of a cathedral dates to 923. In 998 a diploma of Emperor Otto III refers to a Palaeo-Christian building located between the "cathedral square" (Piazza del Duomo) and the city's watch tower. In 1108 the cathedral was damaged by a fire, and was probably rebuilt over the next few decades, as in 1145 an altar was dedicated in it to Saint James the Great by Bishop Saint Atto. In 1202 another fire damaged the cathedral again. In 1274–1275 the aisles were covered with vaults, and in 1287 a new altar was begun. In 1298 there was further damage caused by an earthquake. In 1336 a statue of Saint Zeno was placed in the west front, sculpted by Jacopo di Mazzeo.

Between 1379 and 1440 the façade was reconstructed with the addition of three tiers of loggias and a portico. In 1504 Andrea della Robbia was commissioned to undertake the decoration of the archivolt (for which he created a festoon with plant themes and, in the middle, the crest of the Opera di San Jacopo), of the portico as well as of the lunette with bas-reliefs over the central portal, depicting the "Madonna with Child and Angels". He finished the works in 1505.

In 1598–1614 the medieval choir was demolished, the side chapels were modified and the original apse was replaced by a Baroque tribune surmounted by a dome designed by Jacopo Lafri, while the main aisle was covered by new cross vaults. The decoration of the tribune ceiling was also undertaken, and paintings in the same area and in the main chapel were added. In 1721 a statue of Saint James the Great, by Andrea Vaccà, was added to the façade. The medieval mullioned windows, replaced by Baroque windows, were restored between 1952 and 1966, and the vaults over the aisle were removed.

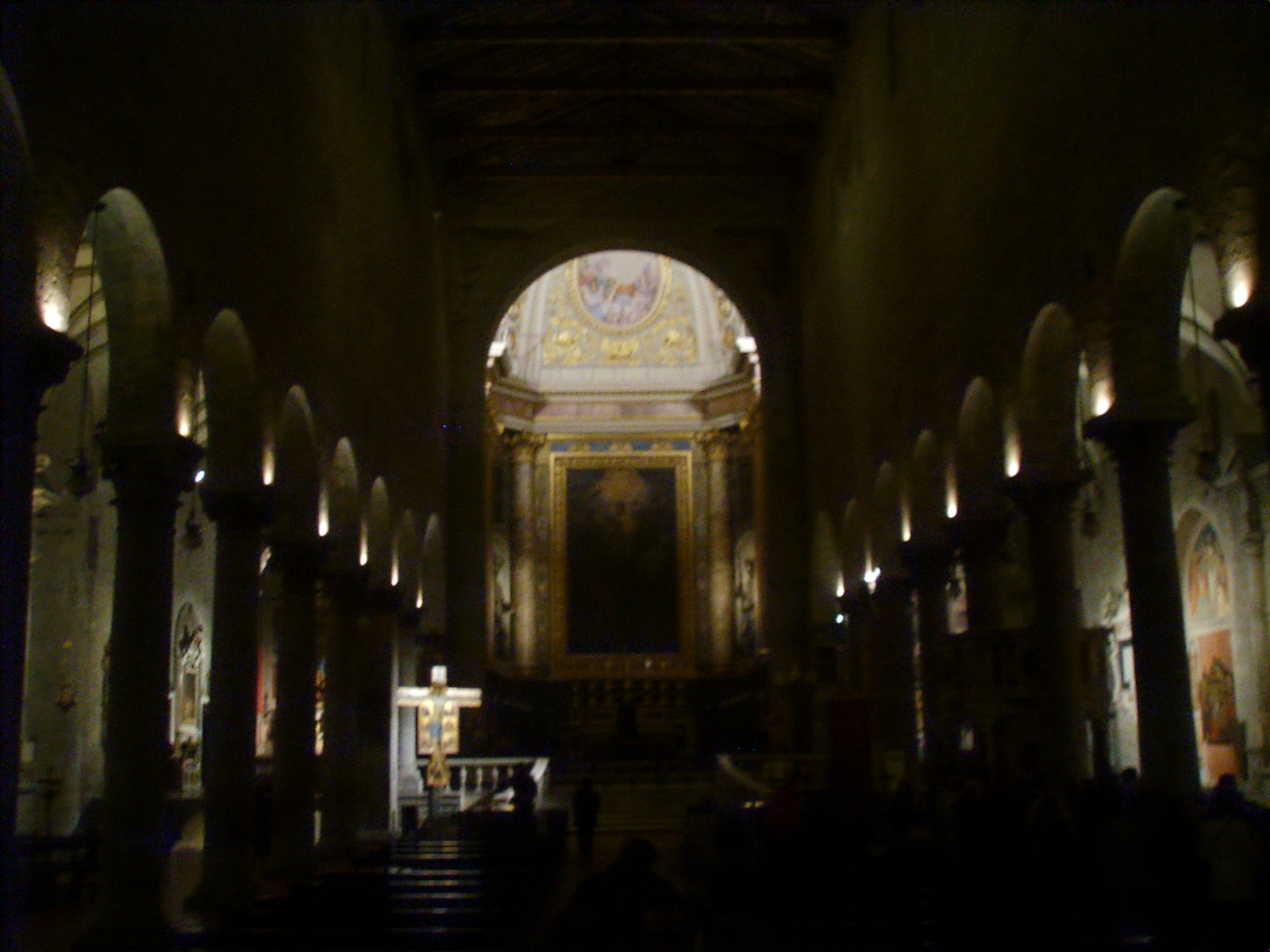
The interior during a night celebration

== Interior ==
The presbytery pavement is raised, housing the crypt underneath, while the nave and the aisles, separated by columns, have vaults and wooden truss covers respectively. The right aisle was once occupied by the Chapel of St. James (San Jacopo), built by bishop Atto in the mid-12th century to house the relics of Saint James brought from Santiago de Compostela. The silver altar of the saint can be seen today in the Crucifix Chapel.

=== Chapel of the Blessed Sacrament ===
The Chapel of the Blessed Sacrament (Capello del Santissimo Sacramento), which houses the tabernacle, is also known as the Chapel of San Donato from a painting portraying the Madonna Enthroned between St. John the Baptist and St. Donatus (c. 1475–1486), on the right hand wall. The painting had been commissioned from Andrea del Verrocchio by the heirs of Donato de' Medici and was started by Andrea but, left unfinished, was completed by Lorenzo di Credi. The bishop next to the Madonna has been identified as Saint Zeno. In the middle is the Assumption of the Virgin by Giovanni Battista Paggi (1590–1600). Next to the chapel's entrance is the tomb of Donato de' Medici (1475), Bishop of Pistoia, attributed to Antonio Rossellino.

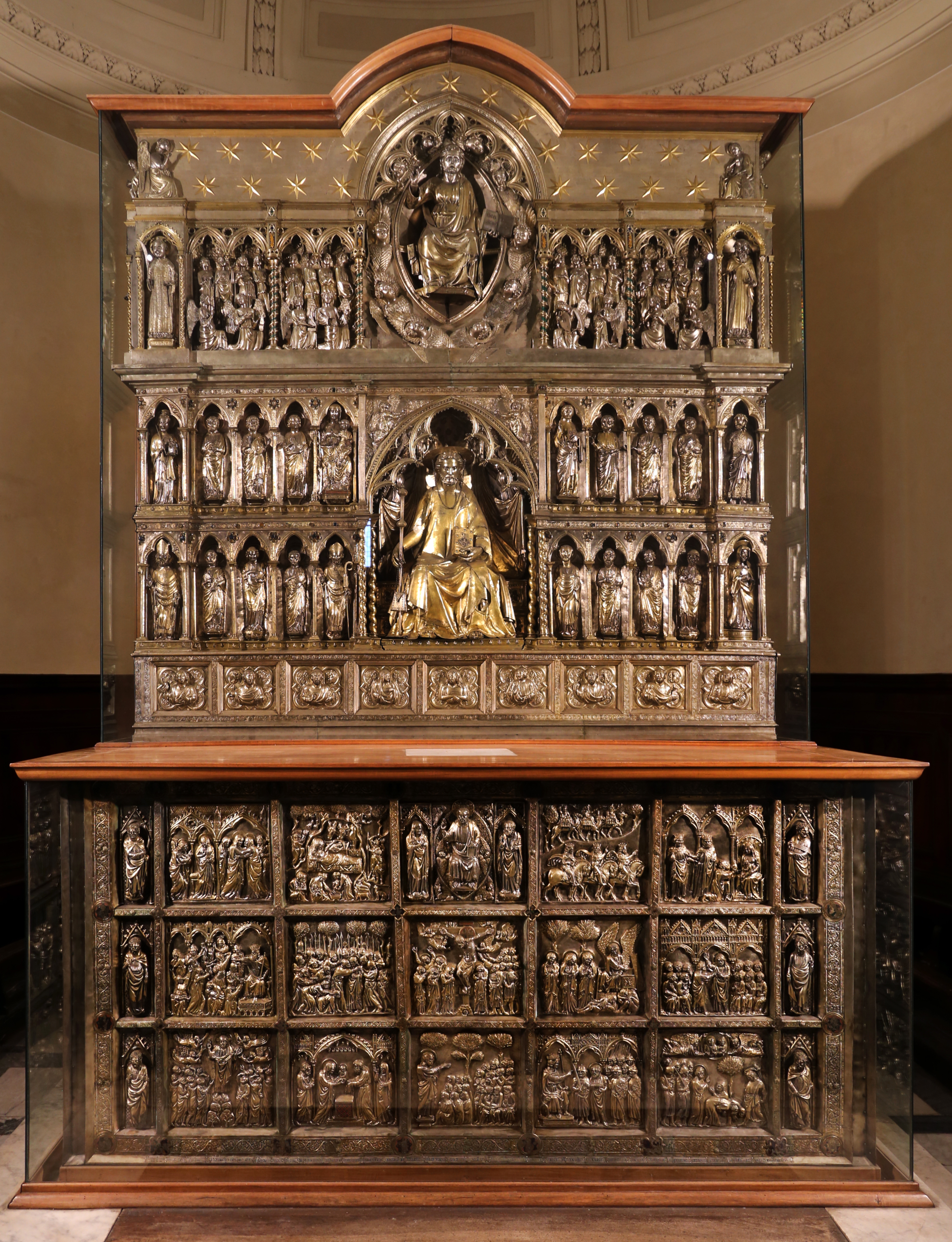
Altar of St. James

=== Crucifix Chapel ===
This chapel contains the altar of Saint James, in embossed silver sheet, which was moved here in 1953. It was begun in 1287, when Andrea di Jacopo d'Ognabene was commissioned to make representations of the Madonna and Child for the rear of the altar, and, for the front section, of Stories of the New Testament, Christ in Majesty between Mary and St. James and Three Stories of St. James, which he finished in 1316. In addition, Pace di Valentino, a Sienese goldsmith, created some of the figures surrounding St. James. Giglio Pisano executed the large silver statue depicting St. James Enthroned (1349-1353), commissioned as thanksgiving after the end of the Black Death in 1348.

The two side antependia were executed by Leonardo di Ser Giovanni and Francesco Niccolai, with Stories of the Old Testament and Stories of St. James, between 1361 and 1371. Other works include the Apostles, St. Eulalia, Bishop Atto, St. John the Baptist and Salome by Piero d'Arrigo Tedesco (1380–1390), another Christ in Majesty with St. Anthony Abbot, St. Stephen and the cusp by Nofri di Buto and Atto di Piero Braccini (1394–1398).

Filippo Brunelleschi decorated the front part with two busts of prophets (1401). The other sides were decorated by Piero d'Antonio da Pisa and Domenico da Imola.

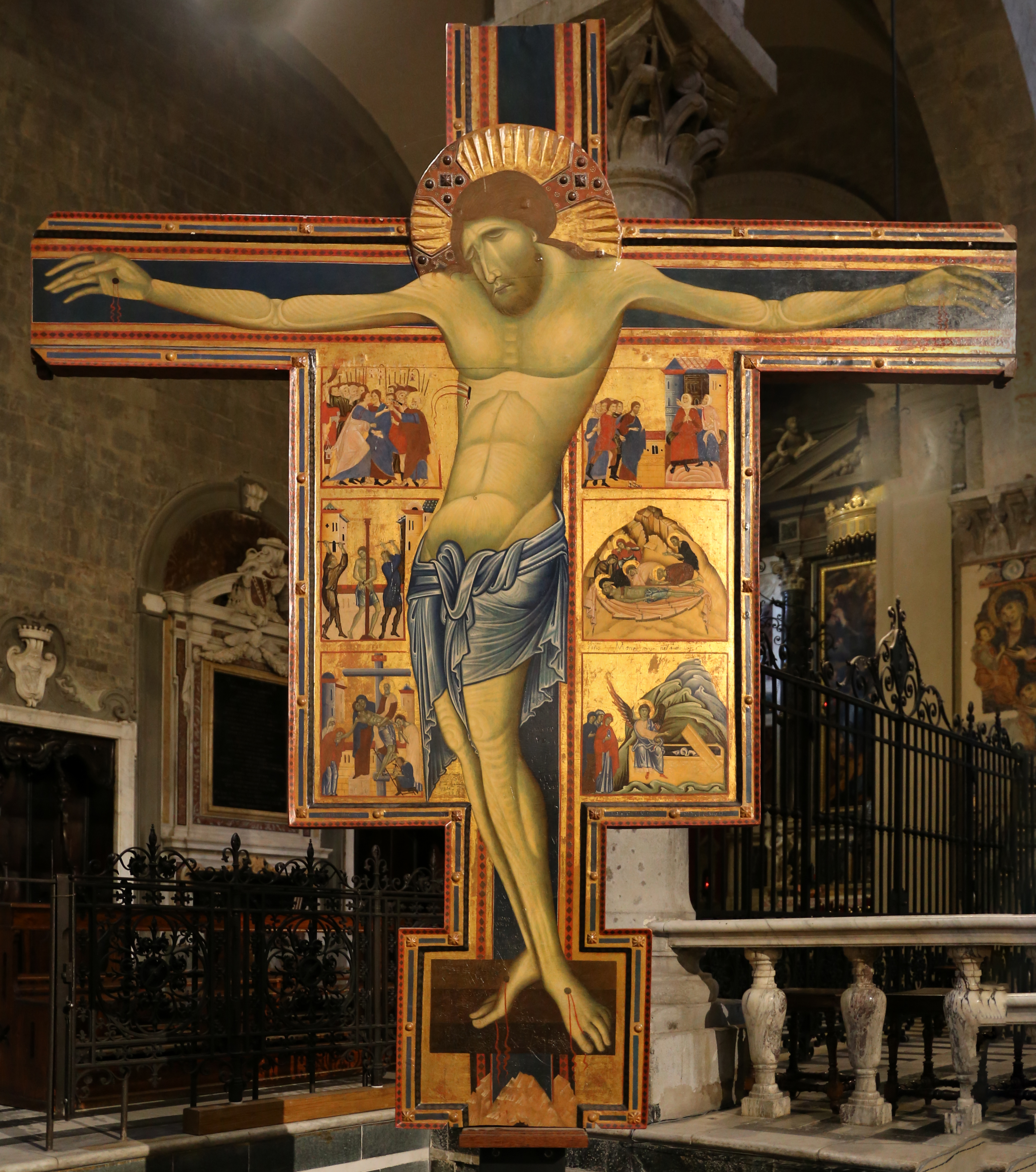
Crucifixion by Coppo di Marcovaldo.

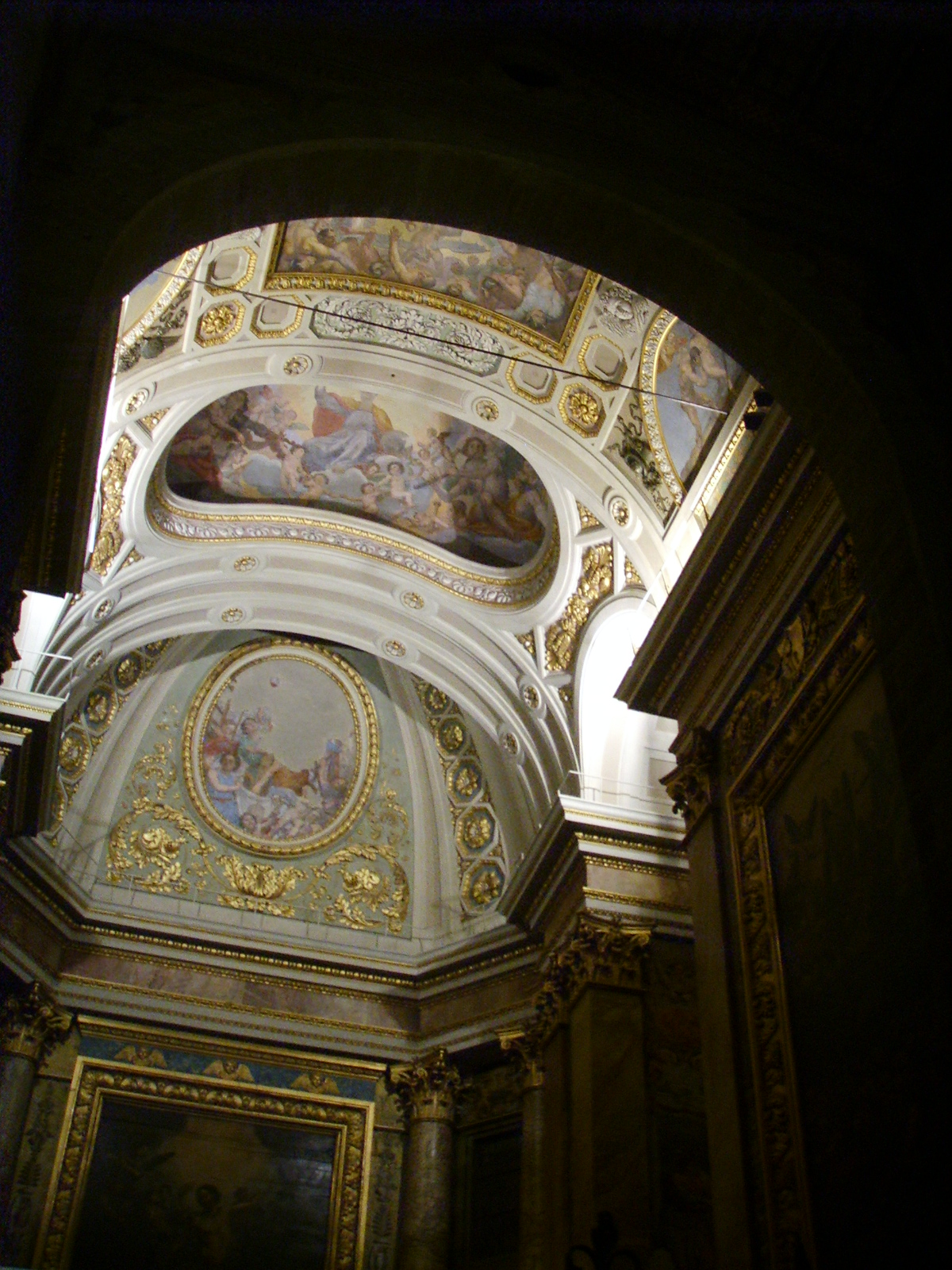
The presbytery vault.

=== Aisles ===
Works in the south aisle include:

- Triptych of Crucifixion between the Madonna, Sts. John, Jerome and James' (1424), by an unknown artist.
- A copy of the Annunciation by Domenico Cresti
- The precious Crucifixion (1274) by Coppo di Marcovaldo and his son Salerno. It includes six panels with the Capture of Jesus, Christ in Front of the Priests, Deposition, Deposition of Jesus in the Sepulchre, The Three Marys at the Sepulchre
- Tomb of Cino Sinibuldi da Pistoia (1337), attributed to Agostino di Giovanni

Works in the north aisle include:

- Monument of Cardinal Forteguerri, commissioned from Andrea del Verrocchio by the Consiglio Generale of Pistoia in 1473. After the death of Verrocchio (1488), Lorenzo Lotti, known as il Lorenzetto, finished the work by sculpting the statue of Charity. The current surround and other details were executed in 1753.
- Madonna delle Porrine, 14th-century fresco by an unknown artist.
- Statue of Pope Leo XI, bishop of Pistoia in 1573 (1618), also from an unknown artist.
- Tomb of bishop Federico Alamanni (1776), by an unknown artist.
- Martyrdom of St. Bartolomew, by an unknown artist (17th century).

=== Presbytery ===
The vault of the presbytery is decorated by frescoes by Domencio Cresti, depicting the Father in Glory, Fall of the Rebel Angels, Fall of Adam and the Annunciation (1602). The organ is from 1793.

In the apse is a painting by Cristofano Allori portraying the Resurrection (1606–1610), beside which are two clay statues of Saint Zeno and Saint James (1609), attributed to the school of Giambologna. To the right of the high altar is a Pentecost by Gregorio Pagani (1602), while on the left is an Ascension by Benedetto Veli (1606).

Salerno di Coppo executed the fresco of the Madonna and Child on the pilaster in the nave (1475). On the right is a bronze candelabrum by Maso di Bartolomeo (1442), while in the left aisle is the cenotaph of bishop Gherardo Gherardi (1703) and, in the right one, the tomb of bishop Alessandro Del Caccia (1650), and the funerary monument of bishop Leone Strozzi (1695), both by unknown sculptors.

The pulpit was designed by Giorgio Vasari (1560). Next to the right entrance is a sculpted stoup attributed to Nicola Pisano's workshop.

=== Others ===
The Chapel of the Last Judgement houses fragments of a fresco by Giovanni da Ponte, dating to 1420–1425. The lateral wall fragments have recently been identified as a depiction of Dante's Inferno.

The crypt is that of the Romanesque building, and was originally divided into a central and side spaces by columns, and had three apses. After the construction of the Baroque tribune, the central room was destroyed and the side ones buried. After the 1960s restoration, here were found two capitals, fragments of columns, fragments of 12th-century frescoes, and two marble slabs from the late 12th century.

The counter-façade houses the Arch of St. Atto, with three marble bas-reliefs from 1337. The baptismal font, to a design by Benedetto da Maiano (1497), can be seen on the left of the main entrance. In the tympanum over the latter is also a 13th-century fresco by an unknown 13th-century master, while next to the right entrance are frescoes of the Virtues by Bonaccorso di Cino (1347) and, near the left entrance, the tomb of Bishop Baronto Ricciardi (14th century).
